= List of Goshen College people =

This is a list of notable individuals associated with the American Goshen College, a private liberal arts college located in Goshen, Indiana. The list includes students, alumni, and faculty.

== Academia and theology ==
- Stephen Ainlay, 18th president of Union College (since 2006)
- Harold S. Bender (class of 1918), former president, American Society of Church History and author of The Anabaptist Vision (1944)
- Denise Konan (class of 1988), professor of Economics and dean of the College of Social Sciences at the University of Hawaii at Manoa
- Alan Kreider (class of 1962), professor, writer and speaker
- John W. Meyer (class of 1955), professor, sociologist
- Steven Nolt, professor at Elizabethtown College
- John Mark Ramseyer (class of 1976), Mitsubishi Professor of Japanese Legal Studies at the Harvard Law School
- Emma Richards, first ordained female Mennonite minister
- Said Sheikh Samatar (class of 1973), Somali scholar, historian and writer
- Rebecca Stoltzfus (B.A. 1984 Chemistry), professor and vice provost at Cornell University
- John Howard Yoder, Christian theologian, ethicist, and Biblical scholar best known for his radical Christian pacifism
- Howard Zehr, "father of restorative justice"; assisted with the founding of a victim-offender reconciliation program

== The arts ==
- Abbie Adams, contemporary artist and illustrator
- Ellah Wakatama Allfrey, OBE (class of 2008), editor and literary critic
- Howard Dyck, Canadian conductor and radio broadcaster
- Vance George, Grammy Award–winning choral director of the San Francisco Symphony Chorus (1982–2006)
- Luke and Jesse Miller, members of the electronic jam band Lotus
- Sofia Samatar, professor, editor and writer
- James C. Strouse, independent filmmaker, writer and director who wrote the comedy-drama film Lonesome Jim (2005) and directed the drama film Grace Is Gone (2007)
- Rudy Wiebe, taught at Goshen College 1963–1967

== Politics ==
- Christine Kaufmann, member of the Montana House of Representatives
- Arthur L. Gilliom, 25th Indiana attorney general
- Jesse B. Martin, Canadian bishop and peace activist
- David Dale Reimer, U.S. ambassador to Mauritius and the Seychelles.

== Popular culture ==
- Justin Yoder, first child with a disability to drive a soapbox in the All-American Soapbox Derby

== Science, technology and medicine ==
- David Bartel (class of 1982), biology professor at the Massachusetts Institute of Technology, member of the Whitehead Institute, investigator at the Howard Hughes Medical Institute
- Philip A. Beachy, Gallo Professor of Developmental Biology at Stanford University
- Roger N. Beachy, biologist, founding president of the Donald Danforth Plant Science Center
- Owen Gingerich, astronomy professor at Harvard University

== Sports ==
- Errick McCollum, professional basketball player
- Katie Sowers, first openly gay and first female coach in Super Bowl history

== Past presidents of the college ==
- Rebecca J. Stoltzfus, 2017–present
- Kenneth Newbold (interim president), 2017
- James E. Brenneman, 2006–17
- John D. Yordy (interim president), 2004–06
- Shirley H. Showalter, 1997–2004
- Henry D. Weaver (Interim president), 1996
- Victor S. Stoltzfus, 1984–96
- J. Lawrence Burkholder, 1971–84
- Paul E. Mininger, 1954–70
- Carl Kreider (acting president), 1950–51, 1970–71
- Ernest E. Miller, 1940–54
- Sanford C. Yoder, 1923–40
- Daniel Kauffman, 1922–23
- Irvin R. Detweiler (acting president), 1920–22
- Henry Frank Reist, 1919–20
- George J. Lapp, 1918–19
- John E. Hartzler, 1913–18
- Noah E. Byers, 1901–13

Principals of the Elkhart Institute
(Elkhart Institute was the former name of Goshen College.)

- Noah E. Byers, 1898–1903
- Willis E. Tower, 1895–98
- Reverend F. A. Hosmer, 1894–95

== See also ==
- List of people from Indiana
