= List of Amish and their descendants =

This is a list of notable Amish and their descendants, including both those who lived or are living culturally as Amish or Amish Mennonite as well as those who recognize themselves culturally as Amish or Amish Mennonite descendants but may or may not practice Anabaptist beliefs. This list does not include those of Mennonite religion only, who are not culturally connected to Switzerland and South Germany and the persecution documented in the Martyrs Mirror.

To be included in this list, the person must either have a Wikipedia article showing they are Amish or Amish Mennonite or are of Amish or Amish Mennonite descent or must have references showing their claim and are notable.

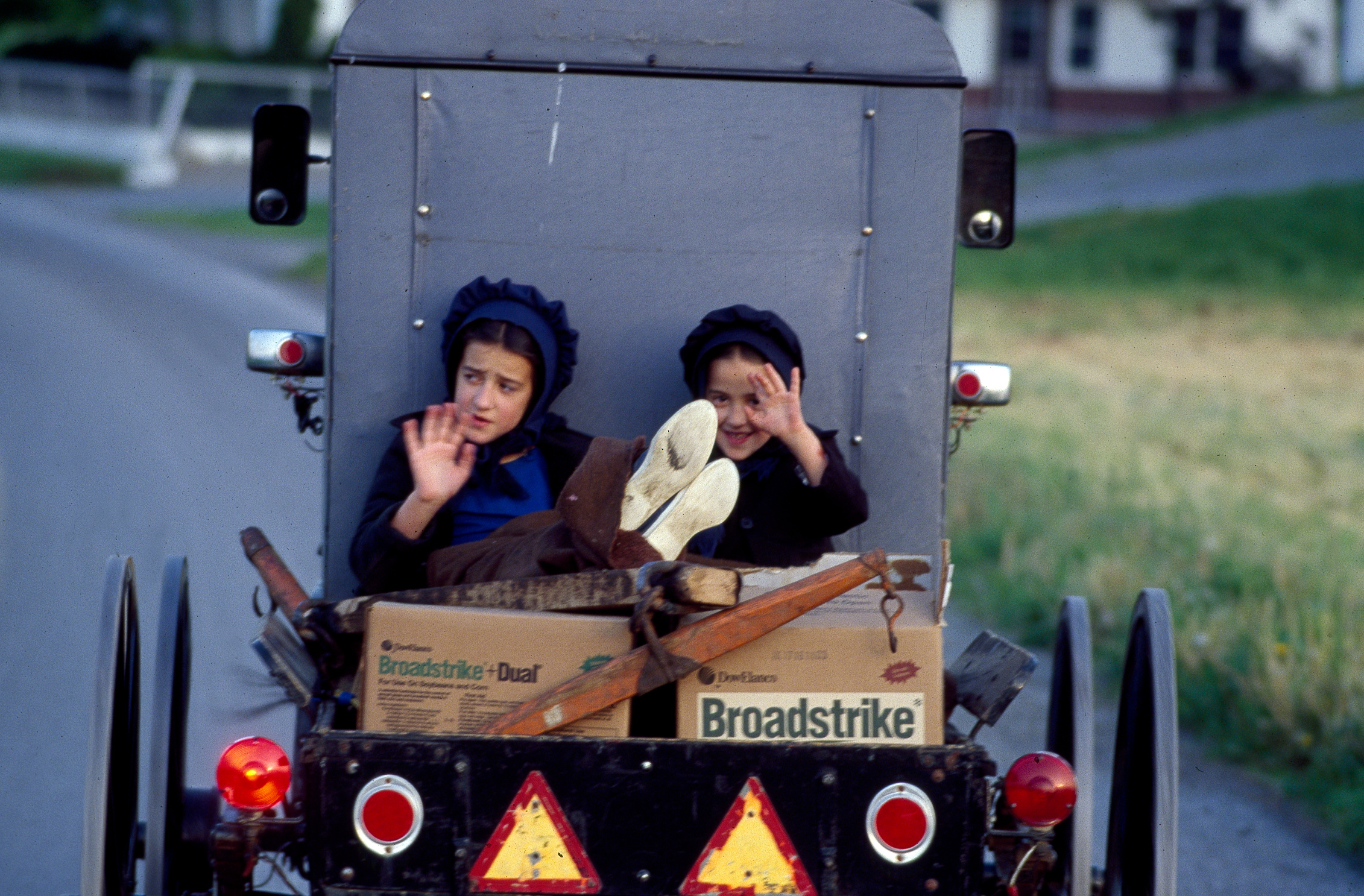
Amish in Lancaster, Pennsylvania

== List ==
=== Art ===
- David Hostetler, carpenter and sculptor
- Henry Lapp, artist and carpenter
- Aaron and Abner Zook, twin 3D artists

=== Business ===
- Anne F. Beiler, entrepreneur and founder of Auntie Anne's
- Milton Hershey, founder of Hershey Chocolate
- Jerome Monroe Smucker, entrepreneur and founder of Smuckers
- Carl Yoder, industrialist

=== Education ===
- Solomon DeLong, Pennsylvania German language writer and journalist
- Joseph Donnermeyer, professor of criminology
- Joseph Funk, musician, educator
- John A. Hostetler, author and educator
- Donald Kraybill, educator
- Joseph Yoder, musician and educator

=== Entertainment ===
- Mose Gingerich, documentary filmmaker
- Elam Stoltzfus, environmental documentary filmmaker
- Kate Stoltzfus, actress and model
- Verne Troyer, actor

=== Literature ===
- Stephen Beachy, author
- Julia Kasdorf, poet
- Christmas Carol Kauffman, author
- Beverly Lewis, Christian fiction author
- Helen Reimensnyder Martin, author
- Sarah Price, fiction author
- John D. Roth, author
- Stephen Scott, author
- Rachel Yoder, author

=== Religion ===
- Moses M. Beachy, bishop of the Beachy Amish Mennonite
- Harold S. Bender, professor of theology and publisher of The Mennonite Quarterly Review
- John S. Coffman, religious leader
- Heinrich Funck, religious author and bishop
- John F. Funk, Mennonite leader who headed the Mennonite Publishing Company
- Hans Herr, considered first Mennonite bishop to emigrate to America
- Guy Hershberger, religious educator
- Gerald Miller, medical missionary
- Elmo Stoll, bishop and founder of the "Christian Communities"
- Sanford Calvin Yoder, religious scholar and WWI conscientious objector
- Tripp York, religious educator
- Jacob and Hannah Hostetler, missionaries of the United Pentecostal Church

=== Sports ===
- Jeff Hostetler, professional football player
- Dustin Stoltzfus, mixed martial artist and former kickboxer

=== Other ===
- Jacob Hochstetler (1704–1775), folk hero
- John Gnaegy (1720–1772), early settler of the Province of Pennsylvania of Amish Mennonite origins
- Nellie Miller-Mann, humanitarian
- Richard R. Schrock, chemist and Nobel laureate
- Lloyd Smucker, American politician
- Gene Stoltzfus, American peace activist

== See also ==
- Jakob Ammann
- Hans Reist
- Pennsylvania Dutch
- Amish & Mennonite Heritage Center
