= Horsch =

Horsch (alternatively Hörsch) is a German surname. Notable people with the surname include:

- Adolphe Horsch (1864–1937), Alsatian playwright
- Elizabeth Horsch Bender (1895–1988), American Mennonite editor and translator
- Helmut Horsch (born 1948), German football player and manager
- John Horsch (1867–1941), American Mennonite historian and writer
- Michael Horsch (1871–1949), German Mennonite leader
- Nicolas Horsch (1889–1940), Belgian olympic weightlifter
- Raymond Horsch (1943–2025), American pornographer, photographer, criminal, and suspected serial killer
- Dwight Horsch (born 1945), American politician, former member of the Idaho Senate and the Idaho House of Representatives
- Gregor Horsch (born 1962), German cellist
- Lucie Horsch (born 1999), Dutch recorder player, 2020 winner of the Nederlandse Muziekprijs
- Wolfgang Horsch, German Paralympic athlete
