= Mennonite Historical Library =

Coordinates: 41°33′49.0″N 85°49′35.6″W

- Location: Goshen College, Indiana, United States
- Established: 1906
- Branches: 1

Collection
- Size: 90,000

Other information
- Director: Elizabeth Miller
- Employees: 3
- Website: www.goshen.edu/mhl

The Mennonite Historical Library (MHL) is considered the world's most prominent and complete collection of resources and artifacts pertaining to Mennonites and related Anabaptist groups. It is housed in the Harold and Wilma Good Library on the campus of Goshen College in Goshen, Indiana. The specialty library was founded in 1906 and grew in earnest in 1924 under the guidance of Harold S. Bender and Ernst Correll. Elizabeth Miller is the current director and Eric Bradley is the head librarian.

== History ==
=== Early years ===
On June 13, 1906, the Goshen College Alumni Association unanimously passed a resolution to establish a Mennonite Historical Library on campus. Already at that date, alumni were committed to fostering the Anabaptist-Mennonite heritage that still informs the purpose of Goshen College and is part of its distinctive character. The suggestion may have originated with C. Henry Smith, then professor of history at the college. Smith, together with the Alumni Association executive committee, served on the book selection committee for the proposed library. By the following June, out of its endowment earnings of $82.50, the Association had expended $33.88 to nurture the growth of the infant collection.

Six years later, not long before Smith departed for what is now Bluffton University, the Alumni Association formally presented the collection, then numbering about 80 volumes, to Goshen College. Among the early volumes were a 1771 edition of the Dordrecht Confession of Faith in French translation; an inventory of the Mennonite Archives in Amsterdam; C.H. Wedel's German-language general history of the Mennonites (the first written and published in America); and Helen Reimensnyder Martin's book Tillie, a Mennonite Maid. The collection grew only modestly during the following decade, a period of turmoil for the college. One of the earliest North American institutional collections of Anabaptist Mennonite materials, the archive has grown over the past century to truly earn the description, prematurely granted by early Goshen catalogs, as "one of the most valuable of its kind in America."

=== Mennonite Historical Society ===
After a one-year closure, Goshen College reopened in the fall of 1924 with a new vision for making the institution a center for the academic study of its denominational heritage in order to educate leaders for the future of the Mennonite Church. Young professors Harold S. Bender, Ernst Correll and Guy Hershberger were among those active in promoting the concurrent resurrection of the college's Mennonite Historical Society. Students, faculty and several alumni and friends were part of the reconstitution group's charter membership of 42 in 1924. Activities of the society and its leaders were key in transforming the MHL's several shelves of topically related material into a comprehensive resource for the study of Anabaptist-Mennonite history, life, and thought.

Over the next five years, the society launched both its scholarly journal, The Mennonite Quarterly Review, and its monograph series, Studies in Anabaptist and Mennonite History. For the next quarter century, the society was the primary funding source for the growth of the MHL. Current acquisitions funding comes from donations, Goshen College, and Anabaptist Mennonite Biblical Seminary. Mennonite Historical Society ended in 2026, moving its various publishing initiatives to other institutions.

=== Building the collection ===
Throughout its history, the MHL has relied on a combination of donation and purchase to build its holdings. In June 1906, Goshen College received as a gift a 1534 Bible in the Zurich (Froschauer) translation long favored by the Swiss and South German Anabaptists over the more widespread Luther translation. One of the library's most prized pieces, the only known copy of the 1564 (first extant) edition of the Ausbund, an Anabaptist hymnal still used by the Amish, was purchased for $10 in 1928 in a Harrisburg, Pennsylvania, bookshop. From early on, the MHL holdings incorporated significant portions of earlier North American collections such as those assembled by Mennonite publisher and bishop John F. Funk and historian John Horsch, who collected books for his work with the Mennonite Publishing House and Mennonite Historical Committee. Later, portions of several European collections (e.g., Christian Hege of Germany and W.J. Kühler of the Netherlands) gave important depth to the library's holdings. Several printers and publishers have regularly donated deposit copies of their publications, notably Mennonite Publishing Network's Herald Press/Faith & Life Resources and Pathway Publishers (operated by Old Order Amish). Contributions have also been critical in the library's effort to sustain comprehensive acquisition of newly published material. Exchanges of material with sister collections, such as Bethel College's Mennonite Library and Archives (North Newton, Kansas), Eastern Mennonite University's Menno Simons Library (Harrisonburg, Virginia), and the Heritage Historical Library (Aylmer, Ontario), have helped broaden MHL holdings beyond the Swiss South-German Old Mennonite segment that continues to characterize their core strength.

In addition to printed materials, the MHL collection has long included "objects of historical interest" - ranging from quilts to toys to furniture. Although at an earlier time the library also collected manuscript items, most of these are now under the care of the Mennonite Church USA Archives, a collection which was long housed near the MHL until a move to nearby Elkhart, Indiana in 2017. The distinction between the Archives' collection of unpublished records and the MHL's focus on published material is easily lost on users—many of whom benefit from visiting both collections. Close proximity of the two institutions clearly strengthens each collection.

=== Finding a home ===
In 1927, the MHL was removed from the general college library into its own room on the third floor of the Goshen College Administration Building; a short while later, it was moved into a larger, more accessible room on the first floor of the same building. In 1940, the MHL became the first occupant of Goshen College's newly constructed Memorial Library, with stacks and workspace separate from the main college library collection. The Archives was then located adjacent to the MHL, as it was also in 1960 when both moved to the new facility for Goshen Biblical Seminary (now known as Newcomer Center). In 1967, the MHL rejoined the college library in its current residence, the third floor of the Harold and Wilma Good Library. In the 1970s as Goshen College and Goshen Biblical Seminary were negotiating terms of separating the two institutions, it was agreed that the MHL would remain at Goshen College in exchange for its collection being fully accessible to the seminary and Goshen College committing great financial resources to maintain the collection.

Today, the MHL occupies the third floor. In addition to public space and a secure rare book room at the north end, portions of the collection are located in a storage area at the south end of the floor. A seminar room named in honor of historian John Horsch houses the 19th- and 20th-century works that were part of the collection Horsch formed at Scottdale, Pennsylvania.

=== Significant accomplishments ===
The MHL collection has over 90,000 volumes and was relied upon heavily by major corporate projects such as The Mennonite Encyclopedia, Hans J. Hillerbrand's Anabaptist Bibliography and Nelson P. Springer and A.J Klassen's Mennonite Bibliography.

In the 1980s, two successive grants from the National Endowment for the Humanities (NEH) totaling more than $290,000 funded the professional recataloging of most of MHL's books. At the time, these grants were among the largest Goshen College had ever received. This work enabled ready international access to information about MHL holdings through the catalog's on-line interface. In 1991, the MHL received another $57,000 NEH grant to microfilm early North American Mennonite periodicals and, in 1998, was awarded a $373,000 grant from Lilly Foundation Inc. to study Amish and Old Order groups in Indiana.

Over the past 20 years, the MHL has supported a variety of exhibits featuring their own materials as well as items belonging to private or other museum collections. As a partner in the Martyrs Mirror Trust, the MHL collaborated with the Kauffman Museum (North Newton, Kansas) to launch a traveling exhibit based on martyr stories depicted in the texts and illustrations of the 1685 edition of Martyrs Mirror. Since 1990, the exhibit has appeared in more than 60 locations in 22 U.S. states and five Canadian provinces. In the Good Library Art Gallery, the MHL has helped mount more than a dozen exhibits that have served the campus and community. The diverse themes of these exhibits include toys and games, Amish crib quilts, Goshen College's centennial, one-person art shows, Fraktur (decorative writing), and furniture.

=== Constituency ===
The MHL continues to focus on the original vision of providing sources for the study of Anabaptist-Mennonite heritage and training young people continues. Staff members assist students and faculty of Goshen College, AMBS and other institutions along with independent researchers who wish to explore any topic related to Anabaptists, Mennonite and related groups.

== See also ==
- Global Anabaptist Mennonite Encyclopedia Online (GAMEO)
