= Defending Constantine =

- Author: Peter Leithart
- Subject: Constantine the Great and Christianity
- Publisher: IVP Academic
- Publication date: 2010
- Pages: 373

Defending Constantine: The Twilight of an Empire and the Dawn of Christendom is a 2010 book by Peter Leithart which examines Constantine the Great and Christianity. Leithart argues that Constantine was a real Christian, and takes issue with John Howard Yoder's view on Constantinianism, arguing that there was no Constantinian shift.

Defending Constantine provoked a book-length response: Constantine Revisited: Leithart, Yoder, and the Constantinian Debate, edited by John D. Roth (Wipf and Stock, 2013).
