= Anabaptist/Mennonite Church sexual misconduct cases =

Anabaptist/Mennonite Church sexual misconduct cases are cases of acts by theologians, educators, pastors, chaplains, and staff or people in positions of power in Anabaptist/Mennonite churches, institutions, or affiliated organizations deemed as sexual misconduct by church organizations. Some of these cases may also be deemed as sexual abuse by law. There have been a number of cases of sexual misconduct involving notable and influential Anabaptist Christian theologians of the late 20th and early 21st century in North America, and scholarship, media reports, and church magazines have revealed that there have been numerous cases of sexual abuse throughout the history of the Anabaptist/Mennonite Church.

== Definitions ==
Church denomination organizations Mennonite Church USA and Mennonite Church Canada define ministerial sexual misconduct as the following in a document entitled "Ministerial Sexual Misconduct Policy and Procedure" published collaboratively in 2016:

Sexualized behavior by a minister, involving one or more individuals with whom the minister has a professional relationship.

The document also generally defines misconduct as "an act or omission by a minister that is contrary to the policies or principles of the area conference based on Shared Understanding of Ministerial Leadership", and sexualized behavior as "behavior by the minister in a professional relationship that shows sexual interest or a choice to make the sexual dimension overt in a relationship whether orally, electronically, on paper or any other form of communication. (See Shared Understanding of Ministerial Leadership, page 68 ff.)."

Other denominations in the Anabaptist/Mennonite church may vary in their definitions and policies.

== Publication and research of cases ==
Several works of scholarship have investigated the publication and record-keeping, or more accurately the lack thereof, of reports and statistics related to sexual misconduct and abuse cases in specifically the Mennonite church.

In 2015, an article was written for the Mennonite Quarterly Review published by Goshen College in Goshen, Indiana entitled "Sexual Abuse by Church Leaders and Healing for Victims" defining "clergy sexual abuse", explaining some potential sociological and psychological explanations for the occurrence of sexual abuse by spiritual leaders, and providing suggestions for how churches should respond to accusations of sexual abuse by clergy and how to help victims heal. It noted that like most other Christian church denominations, there are not reliable statistics available to know the full extent of leader sexual abuse in the Mennonite church although she cites anecdotal evidence by sociologist Conrad L. Kanagy that suggests that Mennonites have rates of sexual abuse at least equal to that of the general population. It theorized that because Mennonites have values such as martyrdom, peace, nonviolence, love of enemies, and forgiveness it may be harder for victims to have the courage to report abusive experiences in the church and when victims, particularly women, did report they often were not trusted and were even ridiculed or shamed. The article argues that the Mennonite Church and institutions have often not responded appropriately to reports of sexual abuse by leaders with more attention being given to damage control and protection of the perpetrator's public image and restoration and little to the needs of victims.

In 2020, a lecture was presented at Conrad Grebel University College's annual Benjamin Eby Lecture, also serving as the year's C. Henry Smith Peace Lecture, in Waterloo, Ontario with a lecture title of "#MennonitesToo: Sexual Violence and Mennonite Peace Theology." In this lecture, research was presented surveying Mennonite periodicals the Gospel Herald, the Canadian Mennonite, and The Mennonite (now called Anabaptist World) for stories of sexual abuse, mostly first-hand accounts by victims from 1970 onward, which were mostly written by women. It was found that in the 1970s accounts of abuse published in these periodicals were vague, in the late 1980s first-person accounts began to appear, and in the 1990s there were many stories of abuse being reported. There was backlash as well as comments by victims who complained of being shamed and being offered little support. Editors of these periodicals began to create guidelines related to the publication of such stories. It was also argued in the lecture that publications have not addressed the abuse of LGBTQ+ people in the Mennonite church.

The American Anabaptist World magazine (formerly called The Mennonite) has also published articles around the issues of sexual abuse and sexuality. "Sexual abuse in Mennonite contexts" appeared in the magazine in 2016 and "What Menno got wrong and the difference it makes" was published in 2014.

== Awareness, prevention, and reporting initiatives ==
A number of overseeing church body organizations have initiated programs to allow people to discuss past events where they feel there may have been sexual misconduct by church leaders in a confidential manner and with no obligation to bring forward these events to the public or anyone else. The following is a list (not necessarily comprehensive) of the organizations that have done so with links to their webpages:

- Mennonite Abuse Prevention - https://www.themaplist.org/
- Mennonite Church USA - https://www.mennoniteusa.org/resource-portal/resource/sexual-abuse-response-and-prevention/
- Mennonite Church Eastern Canada - https://mcec.ca/resources/sexual-misconduct
- Mennonite Central Committee Canada - https://abuseresponseandprevention.ca/

In 2019, the Canadian touring theatre company Theatre of the Beat went on tour to perform a drama called "#ChurchToo" which according to the company's website sought to explore "the struggle of wading into the realities of sexual assault and examining the difficulties of speaking out in a community where the topic of sex is often considered taboo". The play was commissioned by Mennonite Church Eastern Canada, sponsored by Mennonite Central Committee Canada.

== Publicized cases ==
According to the website of Mennonite Abuse Prevention List, a non-profit volunteer-based organization that originated out of the Mennonite chapter of Survivors Network of those Abused by Priests, throughout history there have been credible allegations or confirmed cases of sexual abuse or a related misconduct by a person in a positions of power at a variety of churches and church-affiliated institutions such as mission and service organizations, summer camps, and media institutions. This list contains institutions where a person credibly accused of sexual misconduct has worked but the action of sexual misconduct may not have taken place within each of these specific communities in all cases.

== Old Order Mennonite/Amish/Hutterite communities ==
Old Order Mennonites, Amish, and Hutterites are distinct groups of people of the Anabaptist/Mennonite tradition in North America who choose to live separate from the rest of society and are slow to adopt modern technology or don't at all based on their theology and cultural traditions. Their largest populations are in the US states of Pennsylvania, Indiana, and Ohio and the Canadian provinces of Ontario, and Manitoba.

Because of their isolation and because of their lack of scholarly self-reflection and commentary as opposed to "modern" Mennonites in North America who have universities and publications dedicated to studying and advancing Mennonite theology and other academic subject areas important to them, in general there hasn't been a lot of self-exposure of what goes on in community life. News organizations such as the Pittsburgh Post-Gazette newspaper, The Morning Call newspaper based in Allentown, Pennsylvania, and the Canadian Broadcasting Corporation though have written investigative journalist pieces on the widespread sexual abuse including sexual abuse of children that has gone on inside communities in Pennsylvania and Manitoba.
