= John S. Oyer =

American scholar (1925–1998)

John Stanley Oyer (1925-1998) was an Anabaptist scholar and editor.

Oyer finished his B.A. degree at Goshen College 1951 and started a master's program in history at Harvard University. He wrote his doctoral dissertation at the University of Chicago. In 1955 he began teaching in the Goshen College history department for the next 38 years.

Oyer was the editor of The Mennonite Quarterly Review from 1966 to '74 and from 1977 to '92. He was director of the Mennonite Historical Library at Goshen College from 1975 to 1987.

== Works ==
- Lutheran reformers against Anabaptists : Luther, Melanchton, and Menius, and the Anabaptists of central Germany, The Hague, 1964.
- They harry the good people out of the land : essays on the persecution, survival and flourishing of Anabaptists and Mennonites, Goshen, Indiana, 2000.
- Together with Robert S.Kreider: Mirror of the martyrs, Intercourse, Pennsylvania, 1990.
- Is there an Amish Theology in Lydie Hege et Christoph Wiebe: Les Amish : origine et particularismes 1693-1993, The Amish : origin and characteristics 1693-1993, Ingersheim, 1996, pages 278-302.
