= Elizabeth Horsch Bender =

American Mennonite editor and translator

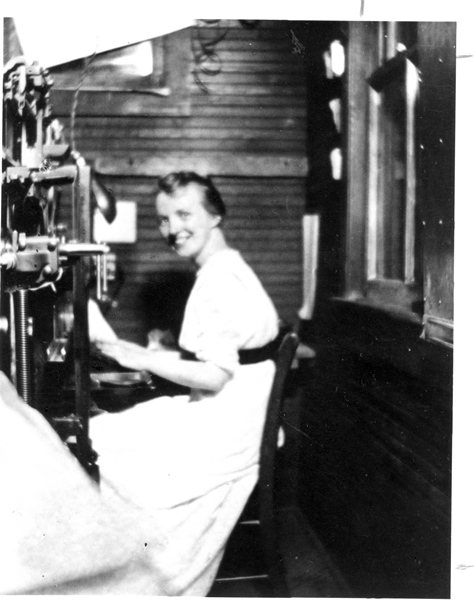
Elizabeth Horsch Bender operating the linotype at Mennonite Publishing House in 1921

Elizabeth Horsch Bender (1895–1988) was an American Mennonite editor and translator.

Bender was a native of Elkhart, Indiana, the daughter of John and Christine Funck Horsch. She was married to theologian Harold S. Bender, for whose books and articles she was the primary editor. The couple had two daughters.

She took her BA degree at Goshen College and received her MA in German literature at the University of Minnesota. Bender translated works from Dutch, French, Spanish, German and Latin into German and English; most notably, her translation of the Mennonitisches Lexikon formed the basis for the Mennonite Encyclopedia. From 1927 until 1985 she was an editor of the Mennonite Quarterly Review.

A member of the Goshen College faculty, her field of study was primarily the role of Mennonites in German and American literature; she taught German, Latin, English, and mathematics. Early in her career she taught at Eastern Mennonite School as well.
