= Homosexuality and Mennonites =

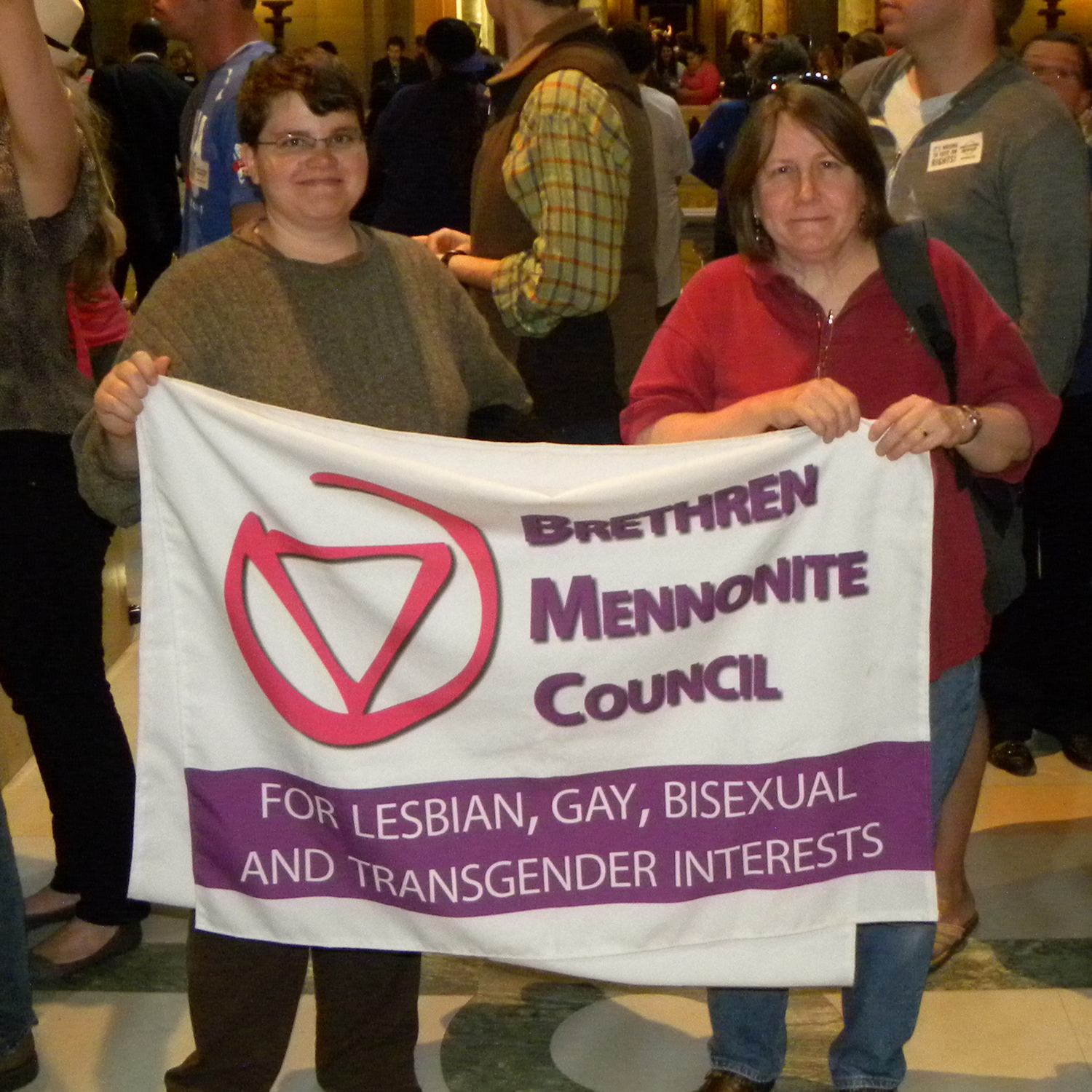
Protesters from a Mennonite council in the United States against the ban on gay marriage in Minnesota (2011)

Mennonite perspectives on homosexuality range from complete acceptance to the prohibition of homosexual behavior among its community members as it is considered a sin.

== Overview ==
Certain Mennonite communities, guided by their pacifist, simple living principles and following thorough theological analysis and discussions regarding the intersection of homosexuality and Christianity, have chosen to embrace and support same-sex couples. Within the Mennonite movement there are different positions on sexual morality, with Conservative Mennonite sectors that defend religious marital union only between a man and a woman, while certain congregations in mainline Mennonite denominations consider that although sex within marriage is a divine mandate as established by the Bible as the sacred text for them, it should also be open to same-sex couples, so they do not fall into sinful acts.

The Mennonite Church in the Netherlands (Algemene Doopsgezinde Sociëteit) was the first Mennonite congregation in the world to celebrate a gay marriage in 1986, even before civil legalization in 2001. In 2001, the Mennonite Church in the Netherlands allowed each congregation to explore the possibility of allowing same-sex unions, whether through a blessing or through marriage.

In 2016, the mainline Mennonite Church Canada assembly held in Saskatoon allowed each congregation to explore the possibility of allowing same-sex unions, whether through a blessing or through marriage. In This Together Network brings together LGBTQ affirming churches.

In 2022, the Mennonite Church USA, a mainline Mennonite denomination, released a resolution acknowledging the harm it has caused to the LGBT community, particularly to couples who share a genuine love for one another. In various parts of the world, some Mennonite communities view the imposition of celibacy on individuals who identify as homosexual or bisexual as a form of sexual violence, resulting in the cessation of such practices. The Supportive Communities Network brings together LGBTQ affirming churches and universities.

In 2023, the Congregational Day of the Association of Mennonite Congregations in Germany held talks and workshops for the effective integration and acceptance of queer Mennonites within their communities.

== See also ==
- Anabaptist/Mennonite Church sexual misconduct cases
