= Global Anabaptist Mennonite Encyclopedia Online =

Encyclopedia (2005-)

- Screenshot of GAMEO as of March 17, 2014
- Website type: Online Encyclopedia
- Website: https://www.gameo.org/
- Current status: Online

The Global Anabaptist Mennonite Encyclopedia Online (GAMEO) is an online encyclopedia of topics relating to Mennonites and Anabaptism. The mission of the project is to provide free, reliable, English-language information on Anabaptist-related topics.

GAMEO was started in 1996 as the Canadian Mennonite Encyclopedia Online by the Mennonite Historical Society of Canada. In 2005 the project was renamed to its current title and the scope expanded with the additional partnership of the Mennonite Brethren Historical Commission and the Mennonite Church USA Archives. The collaboration has since further expanded, with the addition of the Mennonite Central Committee in 2006, the Mennonite World Conference in January 2007, and the Institute for the Study of Global Anabaptism in 2011.

Starting as a database of Anabaptist groups in Canada, GAMEO secured rights to copy and update the Mennonite Encyclopedia published by Herald Press in the 1950s and 1990. A project goal was to have the entire contents of the Mennonite Encyclopedia, including the supplement volume published in 1990, available on the web. This was accomplished by February 2009, at which time the encyclopedia contained more than 14,000 articles. Articles are either adapted from other scholarly works or assigned to knowledgeable authors and then undergo editorial review before publication to the website.

Sam Steiner of Waterloo, Ontario, served as managing editor from the encyclopedia's inception until 2012. Richard D. Thiessen of Abbotsford, British Columbia, was managing editor from 2012 to May 2017. John D. Roth of Goshen College, Goshen, Indiana, was appointed General Editor in May, 2017.

== See also ==
- Mennonite Historical Library
