= MQR =

MQR may refer to

- The Mennonite Quarterly Review
- Michigan Quarterly Review
- Midalja għall-Qadi tar-Repubblika, (Medal for Service to the Republic) post-nominal for recipients
- MQR is the short form for Malkhaid Road in the Indian Railways short nomenclature station codes .
