= Forsch =

Forsch is a surname. Notable people with the surname include:

- Bob Forsch (1950–2011), American baseball player
- Ken Forsch (born 1946), American baseball player

== See also ==
- Horsch
