= Samuel J. Steiner =

Historian of Ontario Mennonites

Samuel J. Steiner (born 18 September 1946 in North Lima, Ohio) is an American-Canadian historian, author, and archivist.

== Early life and Chicago ==
Samuel J. Steiner was born 18 September 1946 in North Lima, Ohio.

He was a member of the Chicago Area Draft Resisters. In 1968, he returned his Vietnam War draft card to authorities. He became a draft resister and Steiner moved to Canada the same year.

== In Canada ==
He worked as historian and archivist at Conrad Grebel University College in Waterloo, Ontario, for thirty years. He the founding editor of the Global Anabaptist Mennonite Encyclopedia. He has authored five books about Mennonite history, including a biography of Jacob Yost Shantz and is considered an authority on Ontario Mennonite history.

In 2012, Steiner was the subject of a play, Gadfly written Rebecca Steiner (not related) subtitled: Sam Steiner Dodges the Draft.

== Family life ==
Steiner lives with his wife Sue, in Waterloo, Ontario.

== Works ==
- "Jacob Y. Shantz: Mennonite businessman" (PDF). Mennogespräch. 5 (1). Mennonite Historical Society of Ontario. March 1987.
- Vicarious Pioneer: The Life of Jacob Y. Shantz. Winnipeg, Manitoba: Hyperion Books. 1988. ISBN 0920534503.
- Lead Us On: A History of Rockway Mennonite Collegiate, 1945–1995. Kitchener, Ontario: Rockway Mennonite Collegiate. 1995. ISBN 978-0969988304.
- In Search of Promised Lands: A Religious History of Mennonites in Ontario. Herald Press. 2015. ISBN 9781513800318.
- A Mennonite Draft Dodger in Canada: A Memoir. Self-Published. 2022. ISBN 9780981151649.

== See also ==
- Bruce Beyer
