= TargetScan =

Content
- Description: microRNAs

Contact
- Laboratory: David Bartel Lab

Access
- Website: http://www.targetscan.org

In bioinformatics, TargetScan is a web server that predicts biological targets of microRNAs (miRNAs) by searching for the presence of sites that match the seed region of each miRNA. For many species, other types of sites, known as 3'-compensatory sites are also identified. These miRNA target predictions are regularly updated and improved by the laboratory of David Bartel in conjunction with the Whitehead Institute Bioinformatics and Research Computing Group.

TargetScan includes TargetScanHuman, TargetScanMouse, TargetScanFish, TargetScanFly, and TargetScanWorm. which provide predictions for mammals, zebrafish, insects, and nematodes centered on the genes of human, mouse, zebrafish, Drosophila melanogaster, and Caenorhabditis elegans, respectively.

Compared to other target-prediction tools TargetScan provides accurate rankings of the predicted targets for each miRNA. These rankings are based on either the probability of evolutionarily conserved targeting (P_{CT} scores.) or the predicted efficacy of repression (context++ scores).

Another distinguishing feature of TargetScan is its use of extra mRNA annotations. In particular, TargetScanWorm and TargetScanFish are based on C. elegans and zebrafish mRNA models for which 3' untranslated regions (3' UTRs) are defined using polyadenylation sites that are experimentally determined using accurate high-throughput methods.
