= Peter Leithart =

American theologian (born 1959)

The Reverend Peter Leithart
- Born: July 20, 1959 (age 67)

Ecclesiastical career
- Religion: Christianity (Reformed)
- Church: Presbyterian Church in America; Communion of Reformed Evangelical Churches

Academic background
- Education: Hillsdale College (BA); Westminster Theological Seminary (MA, MTh); University of Cambridge (PhD)
- Doctoral advisor: John Milbank
- Influences: James B. Jordan

Academic work
- Discipline: Theology
- Institutions: New Saint Andrews College
- Notable works: Defending Constantine (2010)

Peter James Leithart (born 1959) is an American author, minister, and theologian, who serves as president of Theopolis Institute for Biblical, Liturgical, & Cultural Studies in Birmingham, Alabama. He previously served as Senior Fellow of Theology and Literature as well as Dean of Graduate Studies at New Saint Andrews College. He was selected by the Association of Reformed Institutions of Higher Education to be one of the organization's 2010–2012 Lecturers. He is the author of commentaries on the Book of Kings, the Book of Samuel, the Books of Chronicles, the Book of Revelation, as well as a Survey of the Old Testament. Other works include books on topics such as Dante's Inferno, Shakespeare, Jane Austen, and a biography of Constantine. He is also the author of a book of children's bedtime stories titled Wise Words based on the Book of Proverbs.

== Early life and education ==
Leithart was born on July 20, 1959, and grew up in a suburb of Columbus, Ohio. He received a Bachelor of Arts degree in English and history from Hillsdale College, a Master of Arts degree in religion from Westminster Theological Seminary in 1986, a Master of Theology degree from Westminster in 1987, and a Doctor of Philosophy degree from the University of Cambridge in 1998.

== Ministry ==
Leithart was ordained a teaching elder in the Presbyterian Church in America (PCA). In June 2011, Leithart was tried by his presbytery for heresy related to his views regarding the Federal Vision. In October 2011 he was exonerated on all charges. Following his move to Birmingham in 2013, the presbytery with jurisdiction there denied his request to labor out of bounds (in a ministry not connected to the PCA) at Theopolis Institute. He is now a minister in the Communion of Reformed Evangelical Churches and the Senior Theological Mentor for the St. Peter Fellowship of the Center for Pastor Theologians.

== Scholarship ==
His first book, The Catechism of the New Age: A Response to Dungeons and Dragons (1987), co-authored with pastor George Grant, was related to the Dungeons & Dragons religious controversies, when certain religious groups accused the game of encouraging sorcery and the veneration of demons. Joseph P. Laycock wrote that their book condemned role-playing as allowing too much freedom, which the authors regard as a gateway to critical thinking which in turn may result in heretical thought.

In his 2010 book, Defending Constantine: The Twilight of an Empire and the Dawn of Christendom, Leithart takes issue with fellow theologian John Howard Yoder's position that Constantine steered the Church in the wrong direction by abandoning Christ's doctrine of nonviolence, exemplified by his willingness to die rather than defend himself. Leithart argues that God did not want Christians to live as a powerless, oppressed minority. Constantine Revisited: Leithart, Yoder, and the Constantinian Debate, John D. Roth, editor, 2013, is a collection of essays by Christian pacifists criticizing Leithart's argument.

== Publications ==
- with Grant, George (1987). The Catechism of the New Age: A Response to Dungeons and Dragons.
- with DeMar, Gary (1988). The Reduction of Christianity.
- with Grant, George (1990). Clean Air: A Citizen's Handbook for Media Accountability.
- with Grant, George (1990). In Defense of Greatness: How Biblical Character Shapes a Nation's Destiny.
- with Grant, George (1990). The Walls Came Tumbling Down: The Fall of Communism in Our Time.
- The Kingdom and the Power: Rediscovering the Centrality of the Church. 1993. ISBN 9780875523002.
- Wise Words: Family Stories That Bring the Proverbs to Life. Moscow, Idaho: Canon Press. 1995. ISBN 978-1591280149.
- Brightest Heaven of Invention: A Christian Guide to Six Shakespeare Plays. Moscow, Idaho: Canon Press. 1996. ISBN 978-1885767233.
- Heroes of the City of Man. Moscow, Idaho: Canon Press. 1999. ISBN 978-1885767554.
- A House for My Name: A Survey of the Old Testament. Moscow, Idaho: Canon Press. 2000. ISBN 978-1885767691.
- Blessed Are the Hungry: Meditations on the Lord's Supper. Moscow, Idaho: Canon Press. 2000. ISBN 978-1885767738.
- Ascent to Love: A Guide to Dante's Divine Comedy. Moscow, Idaho: Canon Press. 2001. ISBN 978-1885767165.
- A Son to Me. Moscow, Idaho: Canon Press. 2003. ISBN 978-1885767998.
- Against Christianity. Moscow, Idaho: Canon Press. 2003. ISBN 978-1591280064.
- From Silence to Song: The Davidic Liturgical Revolution. Moscow, Idaho: Canon Press. 2003. ISBN 978-1591280019.
- The Priesthood of the Plebs: A Theology of Baptism. Wipf & Stock. 2003. ISBN 978-1592444045.
- Miniatures and Morals: The Christian Novels of Jane Austen. Moscow, Idaho: Canon Press. 2004. ISBN 978-1591280156.
- The Promise of His Appearing: An Exposition Of Second Peter. Moscow, Idaho: Canon Press. 2004. ISBN 978-1591280262.
- 1 & 2 Kings. Brazos Theological Commentaries on the Bible. Brazos. 2006.
- A Great Mystery: Fourteen Wedding Sermons. Moscow, Idaho: Canon Press. 2006. ISBN 978-1591280378.
- Deep Comedy: Trinity, Tragedy, & Hope In Western Literature. Moscow, Idaho: Canon Press. 2006. ISBN 978-1591280279.
- The Baptized Body. Moscow, Idaho: Canon Press. 2007. ISBN 978-1591280484.
- Solomon Among the Postmoderns. 2008.
- Writer of fancy: The playful piety of Jane Austen. Nashville, Tenn: Cumberland House Pub. 2008. ISBN 978-1-58182-645-6.
- Deep Exegesis: The Mystery of Reading Scripture. Baylor University Press. 2009.
- The Epistles of John Through New Eyes: From Behind the Veil. Through new eyes Bible commentary series. Athanasius Press. 2009. ISBN 978-0-9842439-0-7. In this verse-by-verse commentary, Leithart asserts that John, in his epistles, is continuing themes that he began to write about in his gospel, but which now have heightened in intensity and urgency as the fall of Jerusalem in 70 AD approaches.
- Jane Austen. Christian Encounters Series. Thomas Nelson. 2010.
- The Four: A Survey of the Gospels. Moscow, Idaho: Canon Press. 2010. ISBN 978-1591280804.
- Defending Constantine: The Twilight of an Empire and the Dawn of Christendom. IVP Academic. 2010.
- with Barach, John, eds. (2011). The Glory of Kings: A Festschrift in Honor of James B. Jordan. Wipf & Stock.
- Athanasius. Baker Academic. 2011.
- Fyodor Dostoevsky. Christian Encounters Series. Thomas Nelson. 2011.
- Between Babel and Beast: America and Empires in Biblical Perspective. Theopolitical Visions. Cascade. 2012.
- Shining Glory: Theological Reflections on Terrence Malick's Tree of Life. Cascade. 2013.
- Traces of the Trinity: Signs of God in Creation and Human Experience. Brazos Press. 2015.
- Delivered from the Elements of the World: Atonement, Justification, Mission. IVP Academic. 2016.
- The End of Protestantism: Pursuing Unity in a Fragmented Church. Brazos Press. 2016.
- The Gospel of Matthew Through New Eyes Volume One: Jesus as Israel. Athanasius Press. 2018.
- Revelation 1-11. T&T Clark. 2018.
- Revelation 12-22. T&T Clark. 2018.
- The Gospel of Matthew Through New Eyes Volume Two: Jesus as Israel. Athanasius Press. 2019.
- 1 & 2 Chronicles. Brazos Press. 2019.
- The Ten Commandments: A Guide to the Perfect Law of Liberty. Lexham Press. 2019.
- The Theopolitan Vision. Athanasius Press. 2020.
- Theopolitan Reading. Athanasius Press. 2020.
- Theopolitan Liturgy. Athanasius Press. 2020.
- Theopolitan Mission. Athanasius Press. 2021.
- Baptism: A Guide to Life from Death. Lexham Press. 2021.
- Great Stage of Fools: A Guide to Six Shakespeare Plays. Cascade Books. 2021.
