= Abbie Adams =

American contemporary artist

- Born: Abbie Miller; 1990 (age 35–36)
- Education: Goshen College
- Known for: Illustration
- Website: https://www.abbieadamsstudio.com/

Abbie Adams (born Miller; 1990) is a freelance designer and artist working with a variety of traditional media including print, painting and visual design. Adams is based in Pittsburgh, Pennsylvania and from 2018 to 2019 taught English in Spain.

== Early life and education ==
Originally from Wellman, Iowa, Adams studied art, as well as women's and gender studies at Goshen College in Indiana. Initially focusing on painting and photography, Adams shifted her focus to drawing and illustration in her senior year.

After studying abroad in Peru, she moved to Pittsburgh, Pennsylvania in 2013 to complete a PULSE fellowship. PULSE is an organization that pairs recent university graduates with nonprofit organizations in Pittsburgh to "develop the next generation of servant leaders in our city." Adams completed two fellowship years with PULSE, serving as Community Liaison with Union Project, an organization which "uses the arts to bridge gaps between communities".

== Career ==
Often working in sets and collections, Adams creates intricate, hand drawn images that show her fascination with line, repetition and grouping similar objects. Abbie Adams Studio has collaborated with a variety of businesses including The National Aviary, Wigle Whiskey and Schoolhouse to create distinctive, locally themed products and projects.

Always beginning with a sketch, Adams develops by hand each of her studio's products, including stationery, prints, custom fine art pieces and murals. Her favorite materials to work with are pen and ink, paint and paper. The simplicity and detail of her imagery define her signature aesthetic and approach. Whether a collection of state birds, series of local buildings or an illustration unique to her clients, Adams' artwork captures the essential and noteworthy details of her subjects.

Expanding on her illustration work, Adams' love for typography and background in photography led her to graphic design. Abbie collaborates with clients to create impactful, detailed and purposeful design to tell stories and creatively solve problems.

== Selected exhibitions ==
In 2013, Adams completed the "8th Street Project", a collection of drawings from houses on 8th street, observed from Google Street View, located in Goshen, Indiana, New York City; New Orleans; Douglas, Arizona; Los Angeles; Clarkston, Washington; Newport, Tennessee; and Carbondale, Colorado. She completed a similar project in London, England, viewing houses on Google Street View and then visiting them in person the next day with her drawings and a camera.

While living in Pittsburgh, Adams drew "every house on Euclid south of Stanton and half the houses north of Stanton" as part of "The Euclid Avenue Project". This project included 220 drawings of Euclid Avenue houses. On June 6, 2014, local residents were invited to view the project and received the drawings of their individual houses.

Additional exhibitions include "50 Birds, 50 States", "Murals", "Stained Glass Windows", and "Cities, Buildings, and Houses".
