= David R. Harris (sociologist) =

American sociologist and academic administrator

David Harris
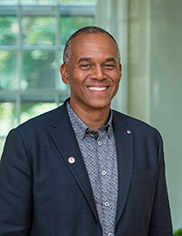
- Harris in 2018

19th President of Union College
- In office July 1, 2018 – July 1, 2025
- Preceded by: Stephen Ainlay
- Succeeded by: Elizabeth Kiss

8th Provost of Tufts University
- In office July 1, 2012 – July 1, 2018
- Preceded by: Jamshed Bharucha
- Succeeded by: Nadine Aubry

Personal details
- Education: Northwestern University (BS, MA, PhD)

David R. Harris is an American sociologist and academic administrator. He is a former president of Union College and a former chancellor of Union University. He previously served as the provost of Tufts University.

== Education ==
Harris studied at Northwestern University where he received a B.S. in human development and social policy in 1991. He later received his Ph.D. in sociology from Northwestern in 1997.

== Career ==
Harris was the former senior associate dean at Cornell University's College of Arts and Sciences and a former deputy assistant secretary in the U.S. Department of Health and Human Services. In addition to his position as dean, he was also Cornell's vice provost, deputy provost, and interim provost. Before Cornell he was also associate chair of the Department of Sociology at the University of Michigan.

During his time at Cornell, he became the founding director of Cornell's new Institute for the Social Sciences in 2004. In 2005 Cornell's provost Carolyn Martin asked him to become the university's first vice provost for social sciences. Two years later Harris became Cornell's first deputy provost, which included acting as the provost's alternate. He played an important role in Reimagining Cornell, a strategic initiative aimed at the financial and administrative reconstruction of the university. In 2010, Harris joined the Obama administration as deputy assistant secretary for human services policy. After, he returned as senior associate dean of Cornell's College of Arts and Sciences.

In 2018, Harris was selected for honoris causa membership in Omicron Delta Kappa at Union College.
