= The Politics of Jesus =

Book by John Howard Yoder

- Author: John Howard Yoder
- Language: English
- Subject: Christian theology
- Publisher: Wm. B. Eerdmans Publishing Company
- Publication date: 1972
- Publication place: United States
- ISBN: 978-0-8028-1485-2
- Dewey Decimal: 232
- LC Class: BT202 .Y63

The Politics of Jesus is a 1972 book by the American theologian and ethicist John Howard Yoder. In it, Yoder argues against popular views of Jesus, particularly those views held by Reinhold Niebuhr, which he believed to be dominant at the time. Niebuhr argued for a realist philosophy, which Yoder felt failed to take seriously the call or person of Jesus Christ. After showing what he believed to be inconsistencies of Niebuhr's perspective, Yoder attempted to demonstrate by an exegesis of the Gospel of Luke and parts of Paul's Letter to the Romans that, in his view, a radical Christian pacifism was the most faithful approach for the disciple of Christ. Yoder argued that being Christian is a political standpoint and that Christians ought not ignore that calling.

One of Yoder's most widely recognized works, the first edition sold over 75,000 copies and it has been translated into at least ten languages. It was ranked by the evangelical magazine Christianity Today as the fifth most important religious book of the 20th century.

== See also ==
- Anabaptism
- Christianity and politics
