= John Howard Yoder =

American Mennonite theologian and academic (1927–1997)

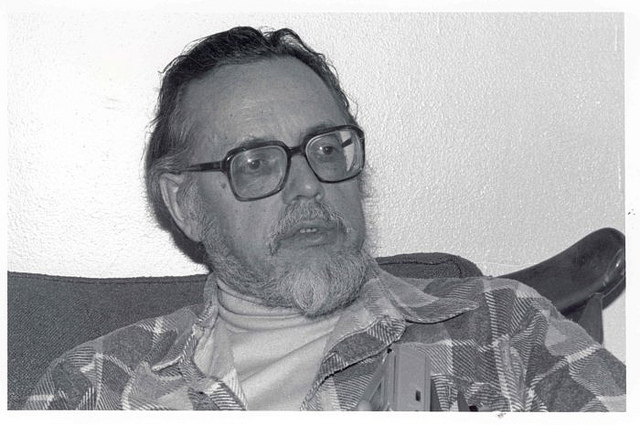
- Born: December 29, 1927; Near Smithville, Ohio, US
- Died: December 30, 1997 (aged 70); South Bend, Indiana, US
- Spouse: Anne Marie Guth (m. 1952)

Academic background
- Education: Goshen College; University of Basel
- Thesis: Die Gespräche zwischen Täufern und Reformatoren in der Schweiz, 1523–1538 (1957)
- Doctoral advisor: Ernst Staehelin
- Influences: Karl Barth; Harold S. Bender; Hendrikus Berkhof; Oscar Cullmann; Guy Hershberger; André Trocmé

Academic work
- Discipline: Theology
- Sub-discipline: Christian ethics; historical theology
- School or tradition: Anabaptism
- Institutions: Goshen Biblical Seminary; Mennonite Biblical Seminary; University of Notre Dame
- Doctoral students: Marva Dawn
- Notable works: The Politics of Jesus (1972)
- Influenced: Greg Boyd; Shane Claiborne; Donald W. Dayton; John Dear; Stan Goff; Stanley Hauerwas; Marlin Miller; James William McClendon Jr.; Bryan Stone; Jim Wallis; Howard Zehr

John Howard Yoder (December 29, 1927 – December 30, 1997) was an American Mennonite theologian and ethicist best known for his defense of Christian pacifism. His most influential book was The Politics of Jesus, which was first published in 1972. Yoder was a Mennonite and wrote from an Anabaptist perspective. He spent the latter part of his career teaching at the University of Notre Dame.

In 1992, media reports emerged that Yoder had sexually abused women in preceding decades, with as many as over 50 complainants. The Anabaptist Mennonite Biblical Seminary acknowledged in a statement from 2014 that sexual abuse had taken place and it had been tolerated partly because he was the leading Mennonite theologian of his day and partly because there were not the safeguards in place that there are today.

== Life ==
Yoder was born on December 29, 1927, near Smithville, Ohio. He earned his undergraduate degree from Goshen College where he studied under the Mennonite theologian Harold S. Bender. He completed his Doctor of Theology degree at the University of Basel, Switzerland, studying under Karl Barth, Oscar Cullmann, Walther Eichrodt, and Karl Jaspers.

After the Second World War, Yoder traveled to Europe to direct relief efforts for the Mennonite Central Committee. Yoder was instrumental in reviving European Mennonites following the war. Upon returning to the United States, he spent a year working at his father's greenhouse business in Wooster, Ohio.

Yoder began his teaching career at Goshen Biblical Seminary. He was Professor of Theology at Goshen Biblical Seminary and Mennonite Biblical Seminary (the two seminaries that formed what is now called Anabaptist Mennonite Biblical Seminary) from 1958 to 1961 and from 1965 to 1984. While still teaching at Associated Mennonite Biblical Seminary, he also began teaching at the University of Notre Dame, where he became a professor of Theology and eventually a Fellow of the Institute for International Peace Studies.

Yoder sexually abused over 100 women during the 1970s and 1980s while at Anabaptist Mennonite Biblical Seminary. The abuse was widely rumored, but not acted upon even when board members became aware of the numerous accusations. The Elkhart Truth first reported on the allegations June 29, 1992. The seminary has acknowledged Yoder's crimes against women and has apologized for not acting on them at the time.

Yoder died on December 30, 1997, one day after his 70th birthday. His personal papers are housed at the Mennonite Church USA Archives.

== Thought ==
Yoder is best remembered for his work related to Christian ethics. Rejecting the assumption that human history is driven by coercive power, Yoder argued that it was rather God – working in, with, and through the nonviolent, nonresistant community of disciples of Jesus – who has been the ultimate motivational force in human affairs. When a Christian church in the past made alliances with political rulers, it was because it had lost confidence in this truth.

He called the arrangement whereby the state and the church each supported the goals of the other Constantinianism, and he regarded this arrangement as a dangerous and constant temptation. He argued that the early Church was a socially subversive community because of their shared life focusing on the Kingdom of God rather than the kingdoms of any mere man, but later after the rise of Constantine the Great the more worldly focused Church came to covet temporal power and political influence. Yoder called this the Constantinian shift. He further argued that Jesus himself rejected this temptation, even to the point of dying a horrible and cruel death. The resurrection of Jesus from the dead was, in this view, God's way of vindicating Christ's unwavering obedience, as well as setting the example of a life laid down in serving and loving others, for all who claim to follow Jesus. Constantine Revisited: Leithart, Yoder, and the Constantinian Debate (2013), edited by John D. Roth, is a collection of essays by Christian pacifists addressing the scholarly debate between Yoder and Peter Leithart about the nature of the Emperor Constantine's impact on Christianity. In his book Constantine Revisited, Leithart opposed Yoder's argument that God preferred Christians to focus on the spiritual needs around them and to build the Kingdom of God, rejecting coercion for a life of service, thereby remaining a politically powerless, physically defenseless minority.

Likewise, Yoder argued, the primary responsibility of Christians is not to take over society and impose their convictions and values on people who don't share their faith, but to "be the church." By refusing to return evil for evil, by living in peace, sharing goods, and doing deeds of charity such as caring for widows and orphans as opportunities arise, the church witnesses, says Yoder, to the fact that an alternative to a society based on violence or the threat of violence has been made possible by the life, death, resurrection and teachings of Jesus. The Kingdom of God comes to rule in a different way, by one heart at a time yielding to the love of God. Yoder claims that the church thus lives in the conviction that God calls Christians to imitate the way of Christ in his absolute obedience, even if it leads to their deaths, for they, too, will finally be vindicated in resurrection.

In bringing traditional Mennonite convictions to the attention of a wider critical audience, Yoder reenergized stale theological debates over foundational Christian ecclesiological, Christological, and ethical beliefs. Yoder rejected Enlightenment presuppositions, epitomized by Immanuel Kant, about the possibility of a universal, rational ethic. Abandoning the search for a universal ethic underlying Christian and non-Christian morality, as well as attempts to "translate" Christian convictions into a common moral parlance, he argued that what is expected of Christians, morally, need not be binding for all people. Yoder defended himself against charges of incoherence and hypocrisy by arguing for the legitimacy of moral double standards, and by pointing out that since world affairs are ultimately governed by God's providence, Christians are better off being the Church, than following compromised moral systems that try to reconcile biblical revelation with the necessities of governance.

== The Politics of Jesus ==
Of his many books, the most widely recognized has undoubtedly been The Politics of Jesus (1972); it has been translated into at least ten languages. In it, Yoder argues against popular views of Jesus, particularly those views held by Reinhold Niebuhr, which he believed to be dominant at the time. Niebuhr argued for a realist philosophy, which Yoder felt failed to take seriously the call or person of Jesus Christ. After showing what he believed to be inconsistencies of Niebuhr's perspective, Yoder attempted to demonstrate by an exegesis of the Gospel of Luke and parts of Paul's letter to the Romans that, in his view, a radical Christian pacifism was the most faithful approach for the disciple of Christ. Yoder argued that being Christian is a political standpoint and that Christians ought not ignore that calling.

The Politics of Jesus was ranked by the evangelical magazine Christianity Today as the fifth most important religious book of the 20th century.

== Sexual abuse ==
According to articles in The Elkhart Truth, allegations that Yoder had sexually abused, harassed, and assaulted women circulated for decades and became known in wider Christian circles, but were never publicly acknowledged until 1992. After repeated institutional failures to address these abuses a group of victims threatened to engage in a public protest at a Bethel College (in North Newton, Kansas) conference where Yoder was to be a speaker. The college President rescinded Yoder's invitation, the student newspaper reported the story, and one of the victims reported that Bethel was "the first institution in the church that has taken this seriously". The Elkhart Truth articles detail extensive allegations of harassment of students and others.

From the summer of 1992 to the summer of 1996, Yoder submitted to the discipline of the Indiana–Michigan Conference of the Mennonite Church for allegations of sexual misconduct. Yoder's writing in the unpublished 1995 book The Case for Punishment suggested he believed he was the innocent scapegoat of a conspiracy. Upon the conclusion of the process, the church urged Yoder "to use his gifts of writing and teaching."

Despite the allegations of abuse, Yoder's obituary in The New York Times did not mention any improprieties. Sixteen years after his death, in October 2013, The New York Times ran an article discussing the allegations, quoting one of the complainants Carolyn Heggen who claimed that more than 50 women "said that Mr. Yoder had touched them or made advances." The article also discussed the recent formation of a support group for victims.

More recently, the Mennonite church and Christian peace theologians are actively trying to come to grips with the sexual abuse – and apparent institutional cover-up – which taints the legacy of John Howard Yoder.

In October 2014, the governing board of Anabaptist Mennonite Biblical Seminary (AMBS) released the following statement:

With a desire to contribute to the larger church discernment process and to own the specific responsibility of the seminary, the AMBS board in their October 23–25 meeting approved a statement acknowledging the pain suffered by women who were victimized by Yoder:

As an AMBS Board, we lament the terrible abuse many women suffered from John Howard Yoder. We also lament that there has not been transparency about how the seminary's leadership responded at that time or any institutional public acknowledgement of regret for what went so horribly wrong. We commit to an ongoing, transparent process of institutional accountability which the president along with the board chair initiated, including work with the historian who will provide a scholarly analysis of what transpired. We will respond more fully once the historical account is published. We also support the planning of an AMBS-based service of lament, acknowledgement and hope in March 2015.

Seminary leaders held an AMBS-based gathering, including a Service of Lament, Confession, and Hope on the weekend of March 21–22, 2015.

The historian Rachel Waltner Goossen was commissioned by Mennonite Church USA to produce a complete report chronicling Yoder's sexual abuse and church responses to it, which was published in January 2015.

== Selected works ==
- The Christian and Capital Punishment (1961)
- Christ and the Powers (translator) by Hendrik Berkhof (1962)
- The Christian Pacifism of Karl Barth (1964)
- The Christian Witness to the State (1964)
- Discipleship as Political Responsibility (1964)
- Reinhold Niebuhr and Christian Pacifism (1968)
- Karl Barth and the Problem of War (1970)
- The Original Revolution: Essays on Christian Pacifism (1971)
- Nevertheless: The Varieties and Shortcomings of Religious Pacifism (1971)
- The Politics of Jesus (1972)
- The Legacy of Michael Sattler, editor and translator (1973)
- The Schleitheim Confession, editor and translator (1977)
- Christian Attitudes to War, Peace, and Revolution: A Companion to Bainton (1983)
- What Would You Do? A Serious Answer to a Standard Question (1983)
- God's Revolution: The Witness of Eberhard Arnold, editor (1984)
- The Priestly Kingdom: Social Ethics as Gospel (1984)
- When War Is Unjust: Being Honest In Just-War Thinking (1984)
- He Came Preaching Peace (1985)
- The Fullness of Christ: Paul's Revolutionary Vision of Universal Ministry (1987)
- The Death Penalty Debate: Two Opposing Views of Capital Punishment (1991)
- A Declaration of Peace: In God's People the World's Renewal Has Begun (with Douglas Gwyn, George Hunsinger, and Eugene F. Roop) (1991)
- Body Politics: Five Practices of the Christian Community Before the Watching World (1991)
- The Royal Priesthood: Essays Ecclesiological and Ecumenical (1994)
- Authentic Transformation: A New Vision of Christ and Culture (with Glen Stassen and Diane Yeager) (1996)
- For the Nations: Essays Evangelical and Public (1997)
- To Hear the Word (2001)
- Preface to Theology: Christology and Theological Method (2002)
- Karl Barth and the Problem of War, and Other Essays on Barth (2003)
- The Jewish-Christian Schism Revisited (2003)
- Anabaptism and Reformation in Switzerland: An Historical and Theological Analysis of the Dialogues Between Anabaptists and Reformers (2004)
- The War of the Lamb: The Ethics of Nonviolence and Peacemaking (2009)
- Christian Attitudes to War, Peace and Revolution (2009)
- Nonviolence: A Brief History – The Warsaw Lectures (2010)
- Theology of Mission: A Believers Church Perspective (2014)

=== Articles and book chapters ===
- (1988) The Evangelical Round Table: The Sanctity of Life (Volume 3)
- (1991) Declaration on Peace: In God's People the World's Renewal Has Begun
- (1997) God's Revolution: Justice, Community, and the Coming Kingdom

== See also ==
- Christian anarchism
- Disciple (Christianity) § Radical discipleship
- Liberation theology
- List of peace activists
- Oak Grove Mennonite Church
- Peace and conflict studies
- Peace churches
- Radical Christianity
