= Hendrikus Berkhof =

Dutch theologian

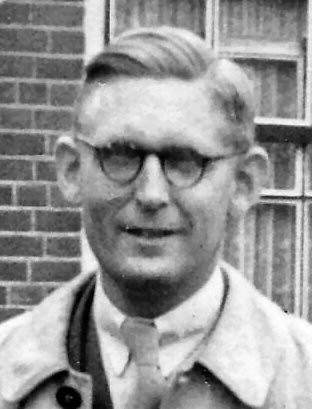

Hendrikus Berkhof (11 June 1914, Appeltern, Gelderland – 17 December 1995, Leiderdorp) was a professor of Systematic Theology at the University of Leiden.

Berkhof was educated in Amsterdam, Leiden and Berlin, before taking up a pastorate in the Dutch town of Lemele in 1938. In 1944, he moved to another pastorate in Zeist. In 1950, he began working for the Church and World Institute of the Dutch Reformed Church at Driebergen. The subject first published Christ and the Powers in 1953 which sought to understand the operation of spiritual and social forces especially in light of the world wars. In 1960, he became a professor at the University of Leiden. Bekhof was also active in a number of ecumenical organisations, including the World Council of Churches, serving on its Central Committee from 1954 to 1975. He was also involved in the World Alliance of Reformed Churches and served as president of the Ecumenical Council of the Netherlands from 1975.

== Works ==
- Berkhof's work—titled "Science and the Biblical World-View"—appears as a chapter in part I (Introduction) of Science and Religion: New Perspectives on the Dialogue (1968), pages 43–53, ed. Ian Barbour
- Christian Faith: An Introduction to the Study of the Faith, Hendrikus Berkhof (Translated by Sierd Woudstra), 1979. Reprint: 2002, Wm. B. Eerdmans, ISBN 0-8028-0548-5
- Two Hundred Years of Theology: Report of a Personal Journey, Hendrikus Berkhof (Translated by John Vriend), 1989, Books on Demand, ISBN 0-7837-7945-3
- Christ and the Powers, Hendrikus Berkhof, (Translated by John Howard Yoder), 1977, Herald Press, 80 pages, ISBN 0-8361-1820-0
- The Doctrine of the Holy Spirit, Hendrikus Berkhof, 1964. John Knox Press, 128 pages, The Annie Kinkead Warfield Lectures, 1963-1964.
- Christ the Meaning of History, Hendrikus Berkhof, 2004, Wipf & Stock Publishers, 224 pages, ISBN 1-59244-638-8
