= Guy Hershberger =

American theologian (1896–1989)

Guy F. Hershberger (December 3, 1896 – December 29, 1989) was an American Mennonite theologian, educator, historian, and prolific author particularly in the field of Mennonite ethics.

== Life ==
Born in Johnson County, Iowa, to Ephraim D. and Dorinda Kempf Hershberger, Hershberger was one of nine children. He was baptized in 1909 at his home congregation of East Union Amish Mennonite Church, where Sanford Calvin Yoder was pastor. He began work as an educator immediately out of high school in 1915 as a teacher in rural schools, where he remained for five years until his marriage to Clara Hooley on 1 August 1920. They had two children who survived into adulthood; Elizabeth (Bauman), born in 1924, and Paul, born 1934. Hershberger then pursued further education, first in the form of an undergraduate degree at Hesston College and then a MA and PhD at the University of Iowa, where his dissertation was on Quaker Politics in Colonial America. All the while he worked first as a teacher at Heston Academy (1923–24) and then began his long career as a professor of history, sociology, and ethics at Goshen College (1925–1966).

In addition to his work as an educator, Hershberger served as chairman of the (Mennonite Church) Committee on Economic and Social Relations (Industrial Relations) from 1939-1965. In 1959, he joined the Mennonite Church's Peace Problems Committee. He played a pivotal role in founding Mennonite Mutual Aid and the Mennonite Community Association. He helped to found The Mennonite Quarterly Review where he was an editor from 1963–1965 and was on the board of the Mennonite Historical Society, The Mennonite Quarterly Review, and Studies in Anabaptist and Mennonite History. Hershberger was the preeminent Anabaptist-Mennonite historian of his generation.

After spending part of his retirement in Phoenix, AZ, Hershberger returned to Goshen where he died in 1989. He was survived by his wife, Clara and two children, Elizabeth and Paul.

== Thought and legacy ==
Throughout his work, Hershberger maintained a strict biblicalism. It was in part due to Jesus' call to love one's enemies that Hershberger made one of his most foundational distinctions. He called for Mennonites to practice nonresistance, which is separate from nonviolent resistance. While some would argue for pacifism as a method of combating injustice, Hershberger thought that most nonviolent resistance went too far. He rejected violence but was also deeply skeptical about utilizing coercion. According to Hershberger, strikes, boycotts, and demonstrations often lacked love for one's enemies.

However he also believed that the individual and the church had to put their beliefs into practice to validate them. it was important to note that in this way, his committee work and church responsibility were the embodiment of his ethical theology.

Hershberger added an academic legitimacy to Mennonite thought. Along with Harold S. Bender, he was important in promoting Mennonite Historical Studies and establishing a scholarly Mennonite ethical conversation.

His personal records are held at the Goshen College Archives.

== Works ==
- Can Christians Fight? (1940)
- Christian Relationships to State and Community: Mennonites and Their Heritage (1942)
- War, Peace, and Nonresistance (1944) (revised in 1953 and 1969)
- The Mennonite Church in the Second World War (1951)
- The Way of the Cross in Human Relations (1957)
- The Recovery of the Anabaptist Vision: A Sixieth Anniversary Tribute to Harold S. Bender (1957, editor)
