= Grand Philharmonic Choir =

Canadian choir

- Also known as: GPC
- Origin: Berlin, Ontario, Canada (now Kitchener, Ontario)
- Genres: Choral music
- Years active: 1883–present
- Members: Artistic director Mark Vuorinen
- Past members: Artistic director emeritus Howard Dyck
- Website: grandphilchoir.com

The Grand Philharmonic Choir is a large classical music choir based in Kitchener-Waterloo, Ontario. The choir sings regularly with the Kitchener-Waterloo Symphony at the Centre in the Square. The choir's artistic director is Mark Vuorinen.

== History ==
The choir was founded in 1883 as the Berlin Philharmonic and Orchestral Society. In 1922, after a hiatus, the choir re-organized itself and changed its name to the Kitchener Waterloo Philharmonic Choir, since the city of Berlin, Ontario, had changed its name to Kitchener during World War I. In 2006, the choir changed its name again, to the Grand Philharmonic Choir.

In 1972, Howard Dyck became the artistic director of the choir, and led the organization for 38 years; upon his retirement, he was named artistic director emeritus. The choir's current conductor is Mark Vuorinen, who holds a Doctor of Musical Arts from the University of Toronto.

A wide variety of internationally renowned soloists have sung with the choir over the years.

== Organization ==
The Grand Philharmonic Choir organization consists of four choirs: an adult choir of approximately 100 voices, a chamber choir made up of members of the adult choir, a youth choir, and a children's choir.

== Programs ==
The adult choir often sings three major concerts a year: Handel's Messiah in December, a concert that includes a major oratorio and some contemporary repertoire in February, and a Bach oratorio on Good Friday, typically the St Matthew Passion, St John Passion or Mass in B minor.

The chamber choir sings two programs a year, and also often performs pieces as part of concerts of the adult choir. The youth choir and children's choirs also produce multiple concerts each year.

All four choirs also join for combined concerts, and often sing the Christmas Pops concert with the Kitchener-Waterloo Symphony. The choir is also active in its community, singing at celebrations throughout the year.

== See also ==
- Music of Canada
- Canadian classical music
- List of bands from Canada
