= Robert Mortimer =

Robert Mortimer may refer to:

- Robert Mortimer (bishop) (1902–1976), Anglican bishop
- Robert K. Mortimer (1927–2007), American molecular biologist
- Bob Mortimer (born 1959, Robert Renwick Mortimer), English comedian and television presenter
- Bob Mortimer (footballer) (1908–1965, Robert Mortimer), English footballer

== See also ==
- Bob Mortimer (evangelist) (born 1954), Christian evangelist
