= Stephen Ainlay =

American college administrator

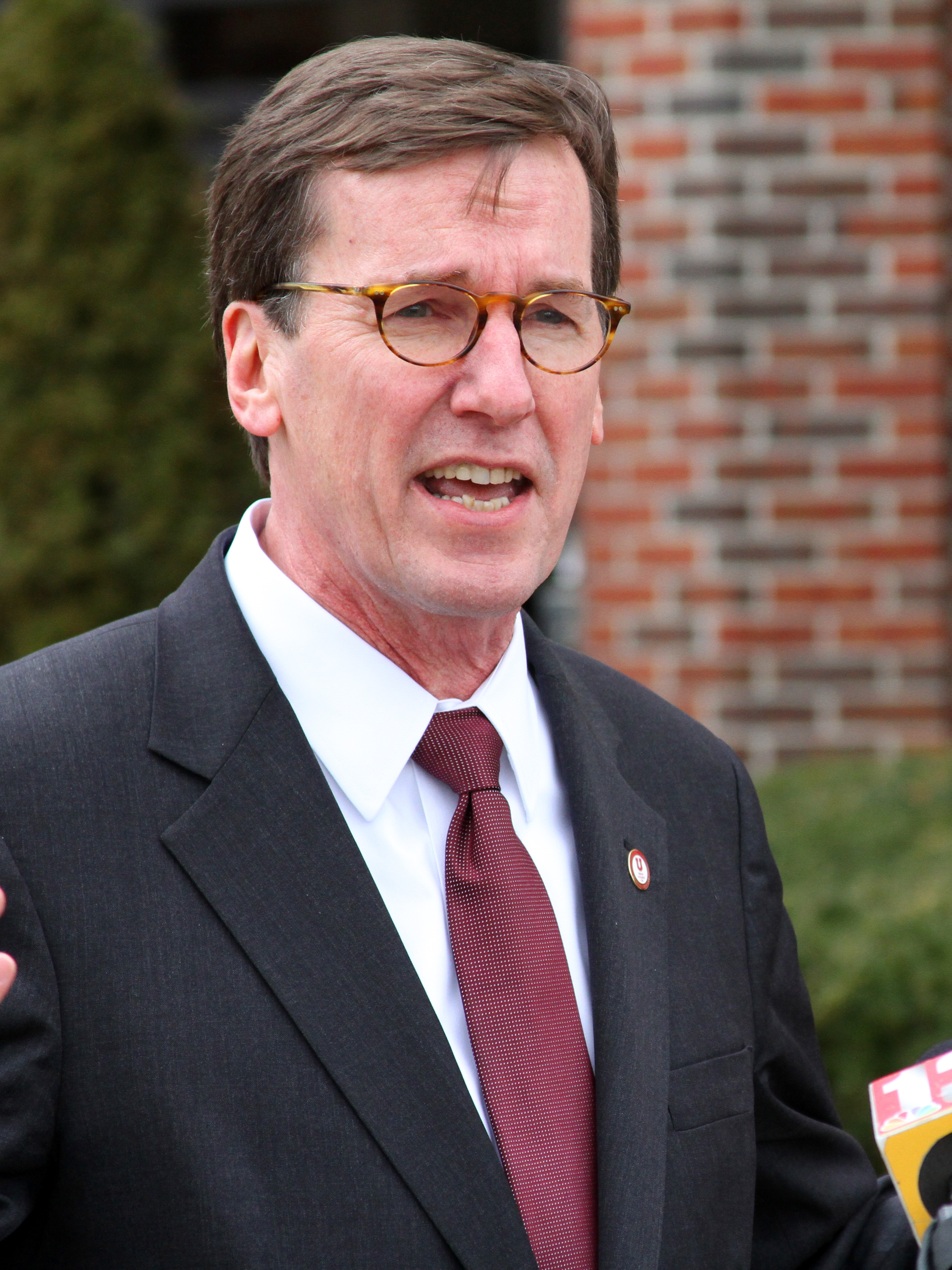
- Ainlay in 2014

18th President of Union College
- In office July 1, 2006 – June 30, 2018
- Preceded by: James Underwood
- Succeeded by: David R. Harris

Personal details
- Born: 1951 (age 74–75) Goshen, Indiana, U.S.
- Education: Goshen College (BA); Rutgers University (MA, PhD)

Stephen Charles Ainlay is an American academic administrator who served as the former president of Union College and former chancellor of Union University. He became the 18th president of the institution in June 2006, succeeding interim president James Underwood, who succeeded Roger Harold Hull after Hull retired in June 2005. He was succeeded by David R. Harris on July 1, 2018.

== Biography ==
Born in 1951 in Goshen, Indiana, Ainlay earned his bachelor's degree in sociology from Goshen College, and both his master's and Ph.D. from Rutgers University in 1981, with a thesis on "Intentionality, identity and aging: an inquiry into aging and adventitious vision loss".

In 1982, he became assistant professor of sociology at the College of the Holy Cross, in Worcester, Massachusetts. He became associate professor in 1987, and professor in 1993. He was appointed Director of the Center for Interdisciplinary and Special Studies in 1993, dean of the college in 1996, and finally vice-president for academic affairs in 1997. He served in this capacity until assuming the presidency at Union College.

Ainlay became president of Union College on July 1, 2006. He also served as the chancellor of Union University, whose member institutions include the Albany Law School, Albany Medical College, Albany College of Pharmacy, Union Graduate College and the Dudley Observatory. He holds a faculty position as professor of sociology at Union.

Ainlay served on the board of the Commission of Independent Colleges and Universities (CICU). Ainlay joined with five other college presidents and, with the help of the Andrew Mellon Foundation, created the New York Six Consortium. The New York Six facilitates collaborative efforts between Colgate University, Hamilton College, Hobart and William Smith College, Skidmore College, and Union College. In 2007, Ainlay was appointed by Governor Eliot Spitzer to the Commission on the Future of Higher Education in New York. Ainlay also serves on the Board of Trustees of Loyola University Maryland.

Ainlay's sociological research projects have focused on investigations of blindness, aging, spirituality and various aspects of Mennonite life, all aimed at better understanding the ways in which people find meaning in their lives.

Ainlay is married to Judith Gardner Ainlay. They have two sons and two grandsons.

== Publications ==
- (with Calvin Wall Redekop & Robert Siemens) Mennonite entrepreneurs Baltimore : Johns Hopkins University Press, 1995 ISBN. According to WorldCat, the book is held in 349 libraries
  - Review by Donald F Durnbaugh, Church History, v66 n2 (Jun., 1997): 421-423
  - Review by Theron F Schlabach, The Journal of American History, v83 n1 (Jun., 1996): 293-294
  - Review, by Royden Loewen, The Mennonite quarterly review. 71, no. 3, (1997): 453
  - Review, by Peter C Blum, The American journal of sociology. 102, no. 1, (1996): 310
- (co-ed with Gaylene Becker & Lerita M Coleman) The Dilemma of difference : a multidisciplinary view of stigma New York: Plenum, 1986 ISBN 9780306423048
  - Review by Harold E Yuker American Scientist v75 n6 (November–December 1987): 644-645
- (ed. with James Davison Hunter) Making sense of modern times New York: Routledge, 1986 ISBN 9780710207456
  - Review, by Richard Perkins Review of Religious Research, v29 n3 (Mar., 1988): 338-339
  - Review, by Robert W Friedrichs, Contemporary Sociology, v17 n1 (Jan., 1988): 114-115
- Day brought back my night : aging and new vision loss New York: Routledge, 1989 ISBN 9780415007641
  - Review by Corinne Kirchner, Contemporary Sociology, v20 n1 (Jan., 1991): 121
