= Dwight Horsch =

American politician (born 1945)

Member of the Idaho Senate from the 29th district
- In office 1985–1986

Member of the Idaho House of Representatives from the 35th district
- In office 1979–1984

Personal details
- Born: 1945 (age 80–81) Aberdeen, Idaho
- Party: Democratic
- Education: University of Idaho; Kansas State University

Dwight Horsch (born 1945) is an American politician and potato farmer who served as a member of the Idaho House of Representatives from 1979 to 1984 and as a member of the Idaho Senate from 1985 to 1986 as a member of the Democratic Party.

== Biography ==
Horsch was raised in Idaho by a German American Mennonite family and attended the University of Idaho and Kansas State University. Following his career in the Idaho state legislature, Horsch also served on the Idaho Transportation Board from 2011 to 2022 and was formerly a Vice President of the National Potato Council, which he has served on since 1988.
