= John Horsch =

German American historian (1867–1941)

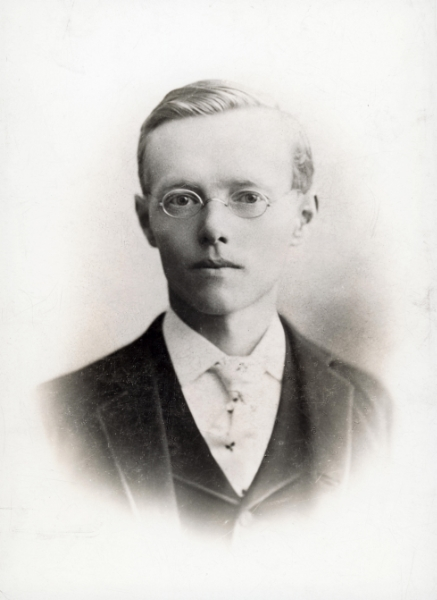
- Born: December 18, 1867; Giebelstadt, Kingdom of Bavaria
- Died: October 7, 1941 (aged 73); Scottdale, Pennsylvania
- Relatives: Michael Horsch (brother)

John Horsch (18 December 1867 in Giebelstadt - 7 October 1941 in Scottdale, Pennsylvania) was a German American Mennonite theologian, historian, and editor. He was among the few Mennonite leaders of his time to actively support Christian fundamentalism and spearheaded a movement to purge those he and his allies deemed "modernists" from church colleges that promoted liberalism and Americanization.

== Life ==
John Horsch was born in Germany in Giebelstadt near Würzburg to Elder Jacob Horsch and his wife Barbara Landes. He married Christine Funck and was the father of three sons and a daughter, Elizabeth Horsch Bender, wife of Harold S. Bender.

John Horsch studied for two years at the Bavarian State Agricultural School at Würzburg, graduating with a diploma in 1886. To avoid military service, he emigrated to the United States in 1887. He was employed by John F. Funk in the Mennonite Publishing Company, where he did much of the editorial work on German language publications from 1887 to 1895. He then served on the editorial staff of the Light and Hope Publishing Company in Cleveland, Ohio, before moving on to the Mennonite Publishing House in Scottdale, Pennsylvania, where he worked from 1908 to 1941. He worked as an editor and writer on history and theology for 55 years. He passed to his reward on October 7, 1941.

== Works ==
- A Short History of Christianity, 1902
- Menno Simons : His Life, Labors and Teachings, Scottdale, PA, 1916.
- Infant Baptism : Its Origin among Protestants and the Arguments Advanced for and against, Scottdale, PA, 1917.
- Modern Religious Liberalism : The Destructiveness and Irrationality of Modernist Theology, Chicago, 1924.
- The Principle of Nonresistance as Held by the Mennonite Church : An Historical Survey, Scottdale, PA, 1927
- The Hutterian Brethren 1528-1931, Goshen, Indiana, 1931.
- Menno Simons' Life and Writings, a Quadricentennial Tribute, 1536-1936, Scottdale, Pa., 1936.
- Mennonites in Europe, Scottdale, Pa., 1942.
- Mennonite History, Scottdale, PA, 1942.

== Literature ==
- Harold S. Bender: John Horsch, 1867-1941: A Biography, The Mennonite Quarterly Review 21 (1947), pages 131–155.
- Harold S. Bender: John Horsch memorial papers, Scottdale, PA, 1947.
- Robert Friedmann: John Horsch and Ludwig Keller, The Mennonite Quarterly Review 21 (1947), pages 160–204.
- John Christian Wenger: The Theology of John Horsch.
