= C. Henry Smith =

American Mennonite historian

C. Henry Smith (June 8, 1875 – October 18, 1948) was a Mennonite historian born in Metamora, Illinois. Smith was the first (known) American Mennonite to earn a Ph.D., doing so at the University of Chicago in 1907. C. Henry Smith (the "C" simply an initial he adopted) taught two stints at Goshen College and became the first dean of the college, before going on to teach at Bluffton University for the rest of his life. Smith's doctoral dissertation was published as The Mennonites of America in 1909 and remained the only comprehensive Mennonite history of American Mennonites into the 1950s.

== Biography ==
C. Henry Smith was born on June 8, 1875, in Metamora, Illinois, one of John and Magdalene Schertz Smith's eight children. John Smith was a bishop. Both of C. Henry Smith's grandfathers had immigrated to the United States from Alsace-Lorraine. C. Henry married Laura Ioder on December 26, 1908. C. Henry was a member of the "Old" Mennonite Church until he moved to teach at Bluffton College and became part of the General Conference Mennonite Church.

=== Education ===
C. Henry studied at Illinois State Normal University from 1896 to 1898, then the University of Illinois, earning a B.A. in 1903. He continued his education at the University of Chicago, earning a Ph.D. in 1907, the second American Mennonite to do so. Smith was beaten out by Noah Hirschy who also earned a PhD in 1907 at the University of Bern, which had an earlier graduation date than the University of Chicago.

=== Career ===
Smith taught at an elementary school for three years (1893–1896), before entering college, and then taught several short stints at the Elkhart Institute (1898–1900) and then its successor Goshen College (1903–1905) while finishing his education. After achieving his Ph.D., Smith returned to Goshen College, teaching there from 1908 to 1913. He then taught at Bluffton College (now Bluffton University) from 1913 until 1948, only interrupted by one year at Bethel College (Kansas) (1922–1923). His subject was History, but he also served as librarian and as Goshen College's first dean. Smith was a co-editor of the Mennonite Encyclopedia until his death and wrote some of the articles therein.

C. Henry Smith also served as the president of the Citizens National Bank of Bluffton, Ohio, and as vice-president of the First National Bank of Pandora, Ohio. As a Mennonite leader, he was a member of his district conference's Peace Committee, and a member of the Board of Publication of the General Conference Mennonite Church.

== Legacy ==
The most tangible component of C. Henry Smith's legacy is the C. Henry Smith Trust which sponsors an annual Peace Lecture given by a faculty member of a Mennonite-affiliated college or university, as well as oratorical contests at Mennonite-affiliated colleges and universities.

In 2009, Perry Bush, professor of History at Bluffton University, was awarded a grant from the C. Henry Smith Trust to write a biography of C. Henry Smith.

== Works ==
- The Mennonites: A Brief History of Their Origin and Later Development in Both Europe and America (1919)
- The Mennonites of America (1909)
- The Story of Bluffton College (1925, edited by E. J. Hirschler and C. Henry Smith)
- The Coming of the Russian Mennonites: An Episode in the Settling of the Last Frontier 1874-1884 (1927)
- The Story of the Mennonites (1941)
- The Mennonite Immigration to Pennsylvania
- Menno Simons: Apostle of The Nonresistant Life (Mennonite Book Concern. Berne, Indiana)
