= Denise Konan =

Denise Eby Konan is the Dean of the College of Social Sciences at the University of Hawaiʻi at Mānoa. She served as the Interim Chancellor of the university from 2005 to 2007.

Konan is a professor in the Department of Economics at the University of Hawaiʻi at Mānoa and prior to her appointment as Interim Chancellor, she was the department chair. She has been a member of the university faculty since 1993. Her research interests include international trade, computational economics, regional integration, multinationals, and services liberalization.

Konan is a graduate of Goshen College in Indiana where she received a bachelor's degree in economics. She is also a graduate of the University of Colorado at Boulder, where she received her master's and doctoral degrees in economics. She was awarded the Excellence in Teaching Award from the University of Hawaiʻi at Mānoa's College of Social Sciences in 1998. She is also an alumnus (1999) of the Pacific Century Fellows program.

Konan has been a consultant to the World Bank, the Council of Foreign Relations, and the World Economic Forum. She is also chair of the Hawaiʻi chapter of Women Leaders in Higher Education.

Konan is married to Abel Konan. They have two sons, Joseph and Roy.
