= Aaron and Abner Zook =

- Born: January 21, 1921; Lancaster, Pennsylvania
- Died: Aaron Zook: 2003; Abner Zook: 2010
- Occupations: 3D artwork combining painting and sculpture

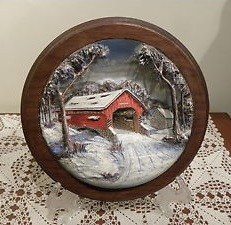
Aaron Zook 3-D painting

Aaron Zook (January 21, 1921 – September 20, 2003) and Abner Zook (January 21, 1921 – March 22, 2010) were Amish identical twins and visual artists known for their 3D artwork primarily pertaining to Amish culture.

Aaron and Abner Zook were born in Lancaster, Pennsylvania, to Amos and Annie (King) Zook. The brothers became well known artists for their 3D paintings. Between the two of them they created over a thousand Amish-life-inspired 3D paintings. Their work has become highly collectible among art dealers.
