= John Gnaegy =

Amish Mennonite settler

- Born: Johannes Gnägi; May 17, 1720; Schwadernau, Canton of Bern, Old Swiss Confederacy (now Switzerland)
- Died: December 15, 1772 (aged 52); Bethel Township, Province of Pennsylvania
- Other names: John Gnage, Kenaga, Kenagy, Knagey, Qnäg, Knege
- Occupations: Farmer, landholder and gristmill owner
- Known for: Being one of the early Anabaptist settlers in Province of Pennsylvania
- Spouses: Mary Holden (m. 1740; died 1742) Magdalena Yoder (m. 1744)
- Children: 12

Signature
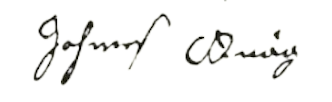

John Gnaegy (né Johannes Gnägi; May 17, 1720 – December 15, 1772) was an original Amish Mennonite settler of a prominent landholder, farmer and gristmill owner in the Province of Pennsylvania. He initially migrated to Montbéliard and made his way to British Colonial America via Deal, England on September 21, 1742, arriving in Philadelphia.

== Early life ==
Gnaegy was born Johannes Gnägi on May 17, 1720, in Schwadernau, Old Swiss Confederacy into an Anabaptist family. His mother was Maria (née Streichenberg; born 1690) originally from Aarburg.

== Emigration ==
At an early age, it is believed by researchers, that John made way to Montbéliard were a group of Swiss and Alsatian Anabaptists had settled to flee religious persecution. He stayed there a while but ultimately went over to Deal, Kent in England. In 1742, he married Mary Holden (1723-1742) with whom he had two sons; Christian and John Jr. - both likely born in Kent, England.

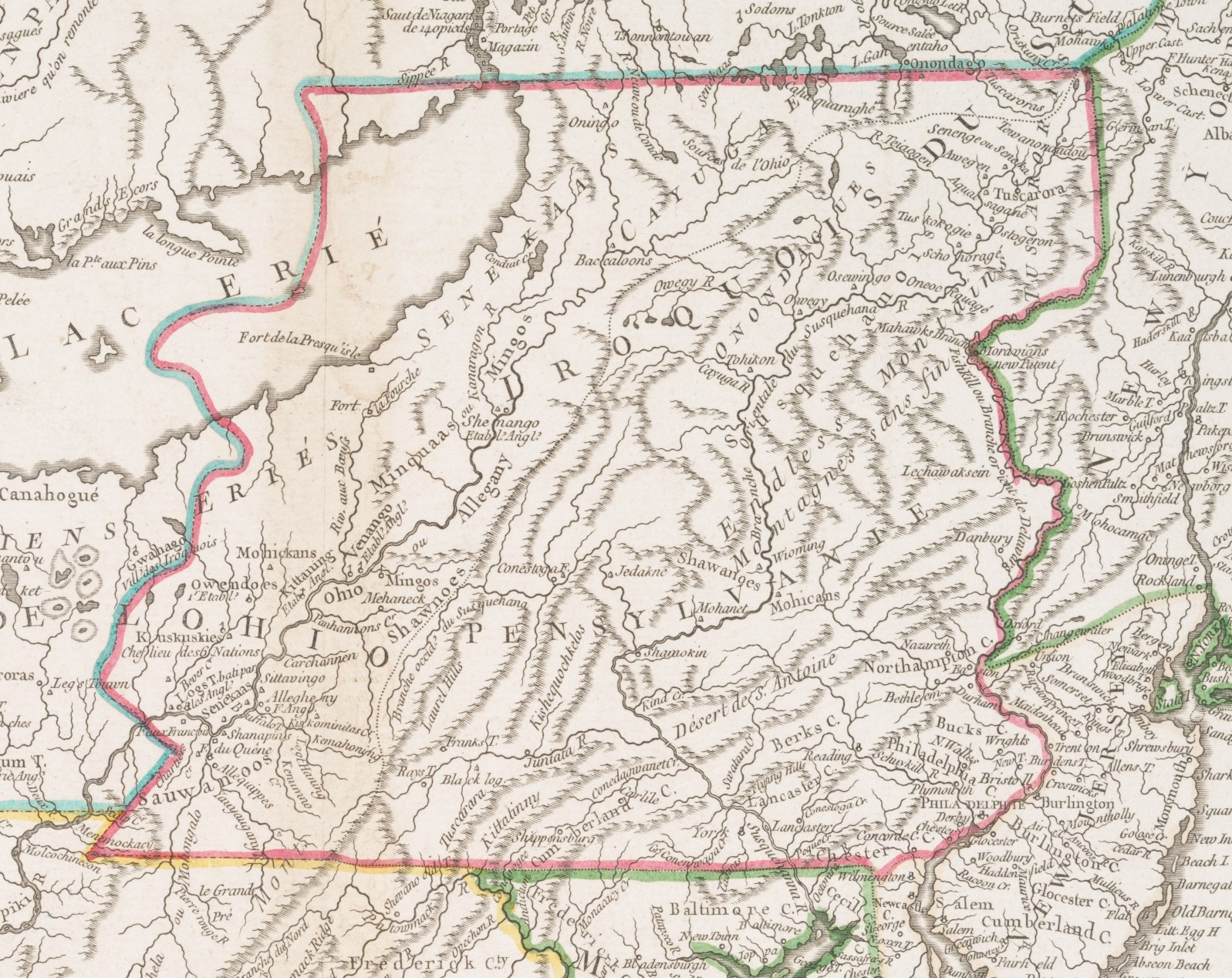
Province of Pennsylvania around 1768

=== Settler in the Province of Pennsylvania ===
He and his family decided to move to the Province of Pennsylvania and boarded the Francis & Elizabeth arriving in Philadelphia on September 21, 1742. His wife likely died at sea and was buried there. In 1744, he remarried to Magdalena (née Yoder, original spelling being Joder), hailing from Steffisburg. They had ten more children, some very prominent Amish Mennonites.

=== Later life and death ===
Gnaegy (there are several variants for the spelling of his name) became a large landholder and operated a grist mill in Bethel Township. He died there aged 52 on December 15, 1772.
