= Michael Horsch =

German Mennonite pastor

- Born: 15 January 1871; Giebelstadt, Kingdom of Bavaria
- Died: 12 October, 1949; West Germany
- Relatives: John Horsch (brother)

John Horsch (15 January 1871 - 12 October 1949) was a German Mennonite pastor who was the leader of the South German Mennonite Conference and founder and chairman of the Christenpflicht relief organization. He was the younger brother of John Horsch, who was a Mennonite writer and publisher in the United States.

== Biography ==
Horsch was born in Giebelstadt, in the Kingdom of Bavaria in 1871 to a family of Mennonite preachers and elders. A conservative Mennonite, Horsch led the South German Mennonite Verband from the 1910s on. In 1920, Horsch founded the Christenpflicht relief organization, based in his estate at Hellmannsberg near Ingolstadt, which distributed food and necessities to those in need in Southern Germany. Between 1920 and 1923, the organization distributed food to an average of 12,000 people a week. After World War II, Christenpflicht continued to distribute packages to the needy in both occupation zones, which continued in the Soviet occupation zone as late as 1952. Horsch was critical of the financial mismanagement of the Rhön Bruderhof, which Christenpflicht supported with food supplies. Following the Nazi dissolution of the Bruderhof, Horsch publicly criticized the Bruderhof and defended the government's actions on the basis that the community was living in extreme poverty.
