= Howard Dyck =

Background information
- Born: November 17, 1942 (age 82)
- Origin: Winkler, Manitoba
- Genres: Classical
- Occupation(s): Conductor, broadcaster
- Years active: 1964–present
- Website: http://www.howarddyck.com/

Howard Dyck, CM (born November 17, 1942) is a Canadian conductor, public speaker, and radio broadcaster born in Winkler, Manitoba, now living in Waterloo, Ontario. He is most well known as the longtime host of CBC Radio programmes Choral Concert and Saturday Afternoon at the Opera, which he hosted from 1987 to 2007.

== Early life ==
Dyck was born and raised in Winkler, Manitoba, in 1942 and later studied at Mennonite Brethren Bible College, now Canadian Mennonite University in Winnipeg and Goshen College in Indiana. He took advanced studies in Choral, Orchestral and Opera Conducting at the Hochschule für Musik in Detmold, Germany, under Prof. Martin Stephani and the Internationale Bachakadamie in Stuttgart, Germany, under Prof. Helmuth Rilling.

== Career ==
In 1972, Dyck became the Artistic Director of the Kitchener Waterloo Philharmonic Choir (later renamed the Grand Philharmonic Choir) and served in that role until his retirement in 2010. He has led choirs under his direction on eleven international tours, across Europe and to China. He has also conducted a variety of European, Canadian, and Chinese orchestras. Soloists who have performed under his direction include Sondra Radvanovsky, Karina Gauvin, Ben Heppner, Richard Margison, Michael Schade, and Russell Braun.

In 1987, Dyck began hosting the CBC Radio programmes Choral Concert and Saturday Afternoon at the Opera, which he hosted until 2007. He has also appeared as a freelance television host and commentator on topics that fall in his areas of expertise.

He is currently the Artistic Director Emeritus of the Grand Philharmonic Choir (formerly known as the Kitchener Waterloo Philharmonic Choir) and chamber singers and is the Conductor Emeritus of the Bach Elgar Choir of Hamilton. He currently serves as the Artistic Director of Consort Caritatis Choir and Orchestra.

== Discography ==
- J.S. Bach's Missa Brevis in G Minor - Polish Radio Chamber Orchestra (London Pro Musica, 1985)
- Handel's Messiah (Sony Classical, 1995)
- Verdi's Requiem - Consort Caritatis, 1998
- Beethoven's Missa Solemnis - Prague Radio Symphony Orchestra (EMI, 2000)
- Reinhard Oppel's Liturgien, Op.6, No. 3 - Consort Caritatis
- Johannes Brahms - Ein deutsches Requiem - Consort Caritatis, State Symphony Orchestra of St. Petersburg

== Honours and awards ==
- 1990 - Kitchener Waterloo Art Award (Music).
- 1996 - Ontario Federation Distinguished Service Award.
- 1996 - Honorary Doctor of Laws (LL.D.) degrees from the University of Waterloo and Wilfrid Laurier University.
- 1999 - Honorary Professor of Music by the Yunnan Arts Institute in Kunming, People's Republic of China.
- 2000 - Member of the Order of Canada.
- 2002 - Awarded the Queen's Golden Jubilee Medal.
- 2004 - Received the Association of Canadian Choral Conductors Distinguished Service Award.
- 2007 - City of Waterloo Legacy of Leaders.
- 2008 - Waterloo County Hall of Fame.
- 2010 - Artistic Director Emeritus, Grand Philharmonic Choir
- 2010 - Conductor Emeritus, Bach Elgar Choir
- 2011 - Waterloo Region Lifetime Achievement Arts Award
- 2012 - Queen's Diamond Jubilee Medal
