= David Bartel =

American biochemist

David P. Bartel
- Education: Goshen College, Harvard University
- Known for: MicroRNAs
- Awards: Grand Prix scientifique de la Fondation Louis D.(2005); NAS Award in Molecular Biology (2005)
- Scientific career
- Fields: Biochemistry, Molecular Biology
- Workplaces: Whitehead Institute, Massachusetts Institute of Technology
- Thesis: RNA recognition and catalysis : I. New ribozymes from random sequences; II. The HIV rev-RRE interaction (1993)
- Doctoral advisor: Jack Szostak

David P. Bartel is an American molecular biologist best known for his work on microRNAs. Bartel is a professor of biology at the Massachusetts Institute of Technology, Member of the Whitehead Institute, and investigator of the Howard Hughes Medical Institute (HHMI).

== Biography ==
Bartel earned his B.A. degree in biology from Goshen College in 1982 and his Ph.D. degree in virology from Harvard University in 1993, under the mentorship of Jack W. Szostak.

While in the Szostak lab, Bartel isolated the first ribozymes directly from random sequence, using in vitro evolution (among these, the Class I ligase). After he became independent at the Whitehead Institute, he further evolved this ribozyme to function as a RNA-dependent RNA polymerase to extend primers on external RNA templates, bolstering the "RNA world" theory.

Bartel later shifted his research focus towards microRNA biology and in particular on understanding their regulatory functions. MicroRNAs are short pieces of RNA, about 22 nucleotides long, that dampen gene expression through the silencing of messenger RNAs (mRNAs). His lab was one of three that found that animals have many of these small regulatory RNAs, and he was the first to describe microRNAs in plants. Through his work with microRNAs, he developed a methodology that predicts their regulatory targets and created the web-based tool TargetScan, which makes these predictions available to the research community. His research has also shown that most human mRNAs are regulated by microRNAs and that microRNAs predominantly act to decrease the levels of their mRNA targets.

Bartel also discovered several other types of regulatory RNAs, including heterochromatic siRNAs, which silence DNA instead of RNA. In addition, Bartel is investigating the roles of long non-coding RNAs (lncRNAs) and how the untranslated regions and tails of mRNAs recruit and mediate regulatory phenomena.

Bartel is a founder and a scientific advisor of Alnylam Pharmaceuticals, a company started in 2002 to advance "RNAi (RNA interference) therapeutics, as a new class of innovative medicines".

In 2006, Bartel was placed second by Thomson Reuters in a 'citations' ranking in the field of Molecular Biology/Genetics. He has received several awards and was elected to the National Academy of Sciences in 2011.
