= Sanford Calvin Yoder =

American academic and pastor (1879–1975)

Sanford Calvin Yoder (December 5, 1879 – February 23, 1975) was a Mennonite pastor, biblical scholar, moderator of the Mennonite General Conference from 1919 to 1921, and president of Goshen College from 1923 to 1940. He was also a leader in the Mennonite conscientious objector movement surrounding World War I.

== Publications ==
- Down South America Way (1943)
- Poetry of the Old Testament (Herald Press, Scottsdale PA, 1948)
- Eastward to the Sun (1953)
- Horse Trails Along the Desert (1954)
- Days of My Years (1959)
- If I Were Young Again (1963)
- He Gave Some Prophets (1964)
