= Harold S. Bender =

American theologian

Harold Stauffer Bender
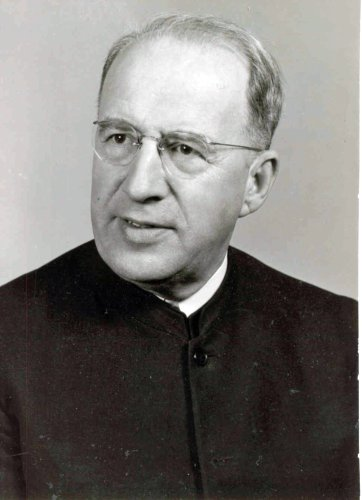
- Born: July 19, 1897; Elkhart, Indiana, US
- Died: September 21, 1962 (aged 65)
- Occupation: Theologian
- Spouse: Elizabeth Barbara Horsch
- Children: 2

Harold Stauffer Bender (July 19, 1897 – September 21, 1962) was a prominent professor of theology at Goshen College (Goshen, Indiana) and Goshen Biblical Seminary. His accomplishments include founding both the Mennonite Historical Library and The Mennonite Quarterly Review. He served as president of the American Society of Church History, and was a major scholarly influence on fellow Mennonite theologian John Howard Yoder.

Bender graduated from Elkhart High School (1914), Goshen College (Bachelor of Arts, 1918), Garrett Biblical Institute (Bachelor of Divinity, 1922), Princeton Theological Seminary (Master of Theology, 1923), and Princeton University (Master of Arts, 1923). He attended the University of Tübingen, 1923–1924. Bender was awarded his Ph.D. from the University of Heidelberg in 1935.

== Background ==
Bender taught one year at the high school in Thorntown, Indiana (1916-1917), and two years at Hesston College (1918-1920). From 1924 to 1962 he was professor at Goshen College in church history, Bible, and sociology. He was dean of Goshen College, 1931–1944, and dean of Goshen College Biblical Seminary, 1944–1962. Bender was the son-in-law of prominent orthodox Mennonite theologian John Horsch.

== Professional ==
Bender is perhaps best known for writing The Anabaptist Vision in 1944. The Anabaptist Vision was a short essay intended to refocus the Anabaptists and Mennonites during the trying years of World War II by re-examining the religious movement's historical context. Anabaptists distinctives were summarized as:

1. Discipleship is the essence of Christianity.
2. Church as a community grows out of the central principle of newness of life.
3. Love and nonresistance apply to all human relationships.
