= John D. Roth =

Professor of History

- Born: 1960 (age 65–66); Aibonito, Puerto Rico

Academic background
- Education: University of Chicago

Academic work
- Main interests: Mennonites, Amish
- Notable works: Beliefs: Mennonite Faith and Practice, Choosing Against War: A Christian View, Stories: How Mennonites Came to Be, and Teaching that Transforms: Why Anabaptist-Mennonite Education Matters

John D. Roth (born 1960) was a professor of history at Goshen College (1985–2022), the editor of The Mennonite Quarterly Review (1995–2022), and director of the Institute for the Study of Global Anabaptism (2011–2022) at Goshen College. He received his PhD from the University of Chicago. Roth has published widely on topics related to the Radical Reformation, ecumenism, global Anabaptism, and contemporary Anabaptist-Mennonite life and thought. His books include Choosing Against War: A Christian View, Beliefs: Mennonite Faith and Practice, Stories: How Mennonites Came to Be, and Practices: Mennonite Worship and Witness. He discussed his book on war in several places including the Netherlands. He has also written for Christianity Today concerning the Anabaptists and Amish.

Roth edited Constantine Revisited: Leithart, Yoder, and the Constantinian Debate, a collection of essays defending Anabaptist theologian John Howard Yoder's critique of the Constantinian shift that aligned Christianity with the violence of the state—against the defence of Constantine mounted by theologian Peter Leithart.

In 2022 he retired from teaching at Goshen College to take a new position as project director of "Anabaptism at 500," an initiative of MennoMedia to commemorate the 500th anniversary of Anabaptist beginnings that will culminate in 2025.
