= The Mennonite Quarterly Review =

- Type: Quarterly journal
- Format: Magazine
- Owner(s): Goshen College, the Associated Mennonite Biblical Seminary and the Mennonite Historical Society
- Editor: Jamie Pitts
- Founded: January, 1927
- Language: English
- Headquarters: Goshen, Indiana, United States
- Price: $9 per issue
- ISSN: 0025-9373
- Website: goshen.edu/mqr

The Mennonite Quarterly Review is an American interdisciplinary review journal, devoted to Anabaptist and Mennonite history, theology, and contemporary issues.

== History, circulation and operations ==
Published continuously since its conception in 1927 by Harold S. Bender and the Mennonite Historical Society, the journal is now a cooperative publication along with Goshen College and the Associated Mennonite Biblical Seminary.

As the first North American journal for and about Mennonites, its older issues contain a wealth of historical materials about their life and theology. It includes articles on the Radical Reformation, Amish, Mennonites and Hutterites, as well as reviews of recent publications and research notes.

As of January 2004, the journal had a total circulation of over 1,000 copies, with 870 paid subscriptions. The total circulation in 1956 was approximately 600.

== Notable contributors ==
- Theron Schlabach
- John Howard Yoder

== Editors ==
- Harold S. Bender, 1927–1962
- Guy F. Hershberger, 1963–1965
- John S. Oyer, 1966–1974 and 1977–1992
- Walter Klaassen, 1975–1976
- Theron F. Schlabach, 1993–1994
- John D. Roth, 1995–2022
- C. Arnold Snyder, 2023–2025
- Jamie Pitts, 2025–2026

== See also ==
- List of history journals
- List of theology journals
