= Goshen College =

Private college in Goshen, Indiana, US

- The Seal of Goshen College
- Former names: Elkhart Institute of Science, Industry and the Arts (1894–1903)
- Motto: Culture for Service
- Type: Private liberal arts college
- Established: September 21, 1894; 132 years ago
- Religious affiliation: Mennonite Church USA
- Endowment: $139.3 million (2024)
- President: Rebecca Stoltzfus
- Faculty: 71
- Students: 847
- Undergraduates: 738
- Postgraduates: 109
- Location: Goshen, Indiana, U.S. 41.5637°N 85.8272°W
- Campus: Large town: 135 acres (55 ha), 1,189-acre natural sanctuary Merry Lea
- Colors: Purple & White
- Nickname: Maple Leafs
- Sporting affiliations: NAIA – Crossroads
- Mascot: Black squirrel (Dash)
- Website: www.goshen.edu

Goshen College is a private Mennonite liberal arts college in Goshen, Indiana. Founded in 1894 as the Elkhart Institute of Science, Industry and the Arts, it is affiliated with Mennonite Church USA and accredited by the Higher Learning Commission. The college enrolled 847 students in fall 2025. Although rooted in the Anabaptist-Mennonite tradition, the college welcomes students of all faiths and backgrounds.

Goshen College is home to The Mennonite Quarterly Review and the Mennonite Historical Library, a research library compiling one of the world's most comprehensive collection of Anabaptist and Mennonite primary source material.

== History ==
"Old" Mennonites started the Elkhart Institute in Elkhart, Indiana, in August 1894, to prepare Mennonite youth for college. H.A. Mumaw, a practicing physician, first led the small operation with a group of 15 "Old" Mennonite ministers and laymen started a corporation named the Elkhart Institute Association. Lured by businessmen to relocate several miles away to Goshen, Indiana, the Institute moved in September 1903 and added a junior college course list, renaming itself Goshen College. By 1905, the Mennonite Board of Education had taken control of the college, dissolving the Elkhart Institute Association. After 1910, most of Goshen's students were enrolled in college courses. There were attempts at founding a "School of Agriculture" and also a college-prep academy program.

The school was closed during the 1923–1924 school year by the Mennonite Board of Education but reopened the following year. One of many factors in closing the college was denominational tension due to modernist and fundamentalist Christian theologies of the 1920s and their impact on Mennonite theology at the school. In response to this crisis, many of Goshen's faculty and dozens of students, frustrated with the Mennonite Board of Education's decision, relocated to Bluffton College.

When the institution was reopened, it was marked by the new leadership of president S.C. Yoder and dean Noah Oyer. The community became known as the "Goshen Historical Renaissance".

During the 1940s, Goshen was one of the Mennonite Central Committee's key places to form a "relief training school" that helped to train volunteers for unpaid jobs in the Civilian Public Service, an alternative to the Army. Many Mennonites chose the civilian service alternative because of their beliefs regarding Biblical pacifism and nonresistance. Young women pacifists volunteered for unpaid Civilian Public Service jobs to demonstrate their patriotism; many worked in mental hospitals. Lois Gunden, a French professor at the college, volunteered for the Mennonite Central Committee and established an orphanage for refuge children of the Spanish Civil War and Jewish children from Rivesaltes internment camp. The children that she rescued were malnourished, in poor health, and had lice. She was awarded the title Righteous Among the Nations by Yad Vashem for her efforts to care for and protect children.

In 1980, the college was granted care of Merry Lea Environmental Learning Center, a 1,150-acre (4.7 km^{2}) nature preserve that now offers Goshen's master's degree in Environmental Science.

In 1993, Harold and Wilma Good, longtime friends of the college, left their estate to Goshen. The estate, said to be worth many millions, consisted of the majority in stock of the J.M. Smucker Company. Wilma was a daughter of the company's founder. The college sold the stock and added the funds to its endowment, more than doubling it.

The campus had a building boom in the late 1990s. The Goshen campus has increased from less than 50 acres (200,000 m^{2}) to 135 acres (0.55 km^{2}) with 18 major buildings.

In 2011, LGBT Christian students advocated for equal human rights in administrative policies. Goshen and Eastern Mennonite University in Harrisonburg, Virginia added sexual orientation to their anti-discrimination policy in July 2015, allowing the hiring of openly LGBT employees. This decision was criticized by member-universities of the Council for Christian Colleges and Universities (CCCU), prompting both universities to leave the organization in September 2015.

On January 21, 2010, The President's Council announced a change to Goshen's long-standing policy of not playing the national anthem at college events to begin playing an instrumental version of song prior to some college sporting events. This decision led to complaints from students, faculty, and alumni and Goshen's Board of Directors reversed the President's Council decision after seeking extensive input from the college community.

The incident thrust Goshen College into the national limelight that June when several reports on Fox News publicized the fact that the college refused to play the national anthem at its athletic events. Subsequently, two Goshen city councilmen also criticized the college. The college, affiliated with Mennonite Church USA, which is traditionally a peace church, published an online fact sheet stating that "historically, playing the national anthem has not been among Goshen College's practices because of our Christ-centered core value of compassionate peacemaking seeming to be in conflict with the anthem's militaristic language." The college's president, James E. Brenneman, announced on August 19, 2011, that as an alternative, "America the Beautiful" would be played before select athletic events.

== Publications ==
The college manages several publications, including The Mennonite Quarterly Review, Mennonite Historical Library, and Mennonite Church USA Archives. It also hosts the Mennonite Central Committee archives, offices of "The Mennonite", and has numerous alumni connections with the broader Mennonite Church.

== Academics ==
Goshen College offers 46 majors and 52 minors for undergraduates. Some of the most popular programs are nursing, biology, business, communication, education, American Sign Language and environmental science. The college also offers a Master of Arts in Environmental Education, a master's degree in intercultural leadership, and a master's degree in nursing with two tracks: family nurse practitioner and clinical nurse leader. In 2014, Goshen College partnered with Eastern Mennonite University and Bluffton University to launch the Collaborative MBA program.

=== Study-Service Term ===
Students either spend a semester abroad or complete an intercultural experience in the United States. Goshen College's Study-Service Term (SST) is a program which approximately 80 percent of students participate in to complete their intercultural study requirement. Service may include working at a hospital, nursing home, kindergarten, or missionary service. The college has in the past also offered a domestic SST to immerse students in the Latino culture and community in northern Indiana.

== Student life ==
=== Clubs and organizations ===
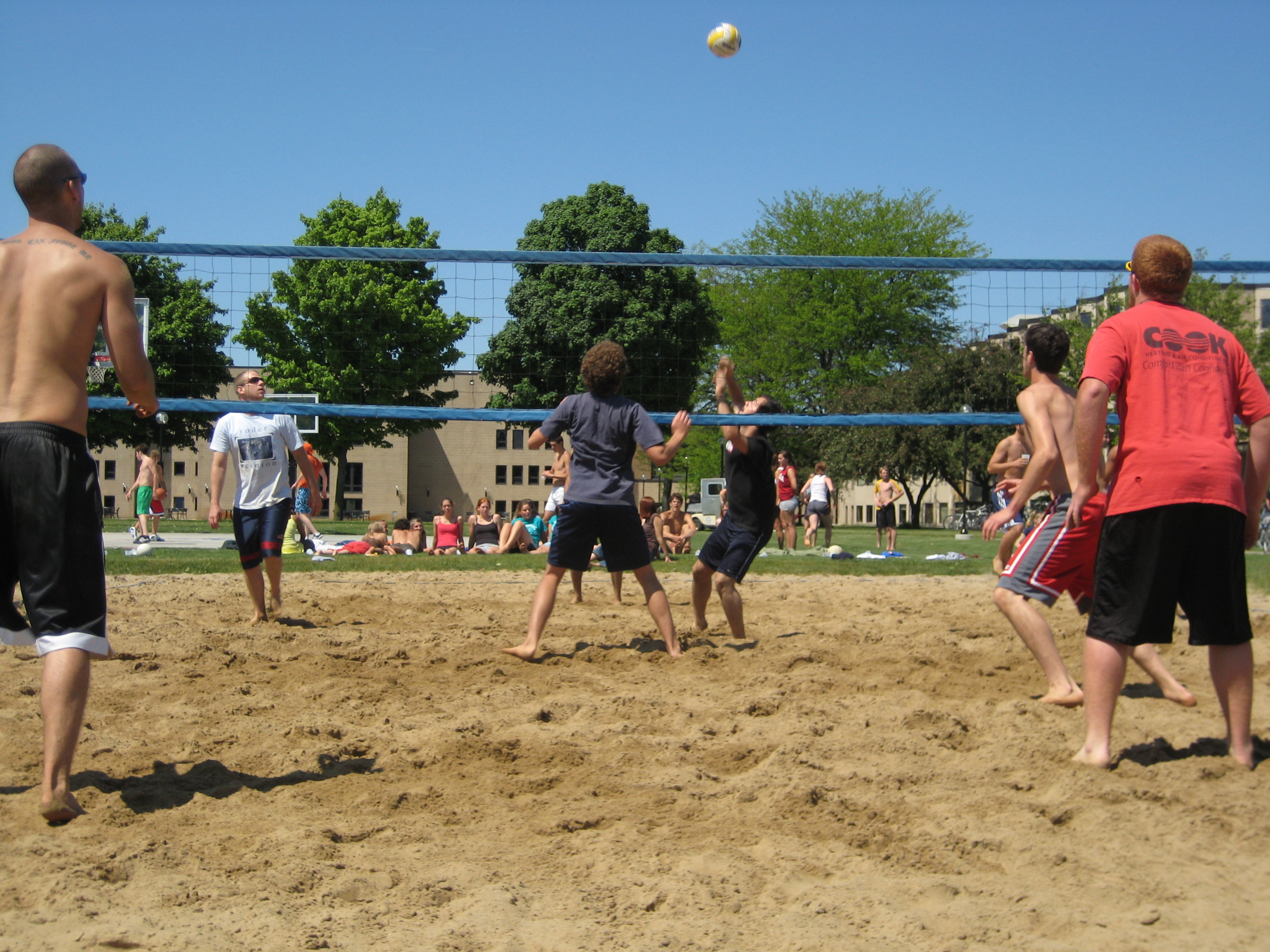
Goshen College intramural volleyball

Goshen College has no official fraternities or sororities; however, many different types of clubs and organizations exist to help facilitate campus life.

==== International students ====
The International Students Club (ISC) hosts the Coffeehouse every year, an event during which international students demonstrate their artistic talents. Students are also given the opportunity, through Global Citizenship, to individually talk about their culture, and have it published by the Goshen College newspaper.

==== Intramural athletics ====
Intramural athletics are also offered. Throughout the year, students can participate in the coed sports of outdoor soccer, volleyball, sand volleyball, kickball, ping-pong, pickleball, touch football, ultimate frisbee, wiffleball, basketball, indoor soccer, and 3-on-3 basketball.

=== Performing arts ===
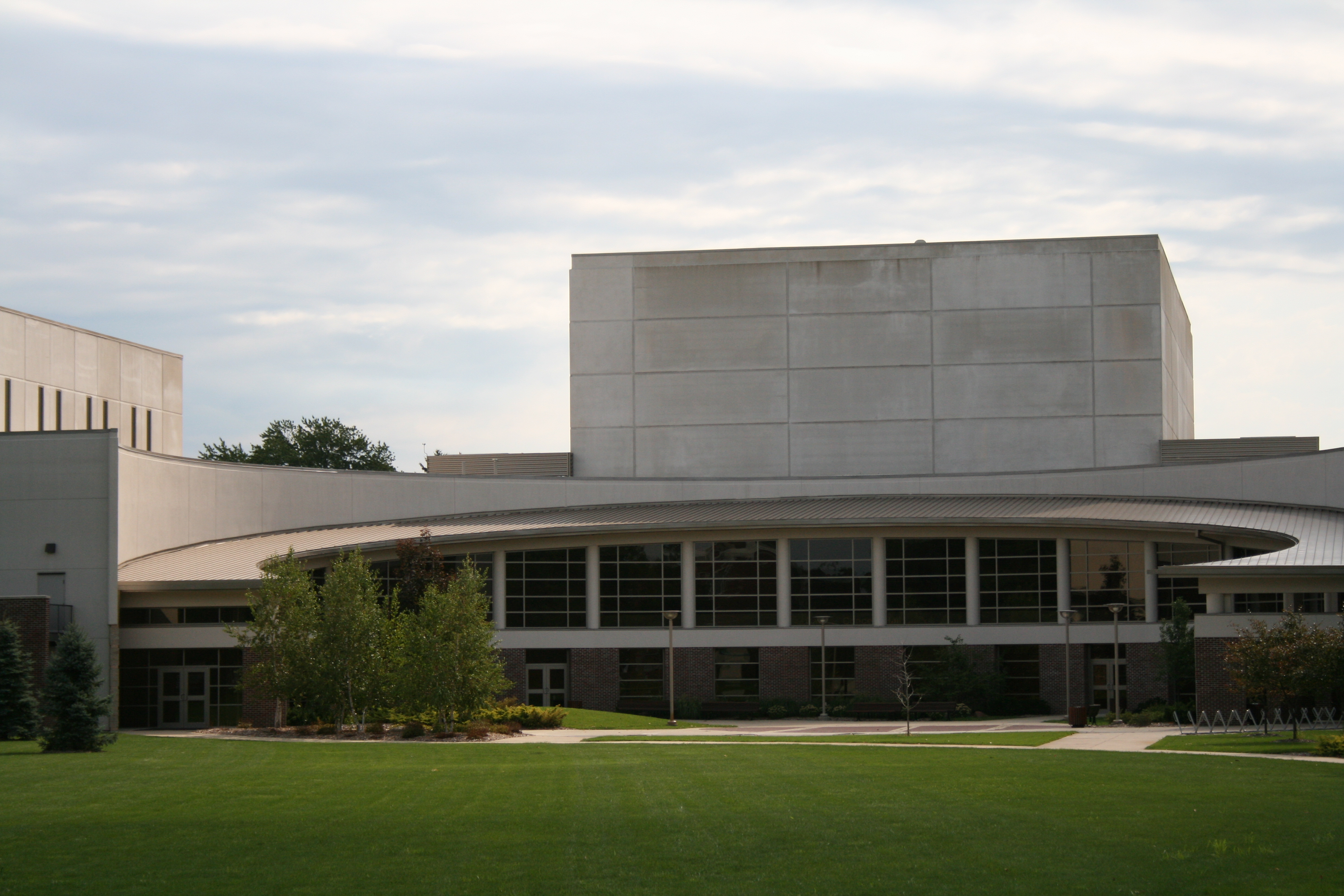
The Goshen College Music Center

Goshen College students have a variety of shows to attend in the Music Center's Sauder Concert Hall and Rieth Recital Hall or the Umble Center, used for theatrical productions. With the addition of the Music Center to campus, the college has offered a Performing Arts Series of nationally renowned artists from across the country. Previous guests include Garrison Keillor and A Prairie Home Companion, Indigo Girls, The Wailin' Jennys, Nickel Creek, Colm Wilkinson, Chanticleer, Canadian Brass, Tokyo String Quartet, Seraphic Fire, and Lincoln Center Jazz Orchestra with Wynton Marsalis.

=== Spiritual life ===
Although Goshen maintains that people of different faiths are welcome to the college, the school emphasizes Judeo-Christian values in regard to operation, justice, and teaching. Historically, faculty members at the school have been Christian, with a large portion adhering to Mennonite convictions.

== Athletics ==
The Goshen athletic teams are called the Maple Leafs (chosen due to the city of Goshen being referred to as "The Maple City"). The college is a member of the National Association of Intercollegiate Athletics (NAIA), primarily competing in the Crossroads League (formerly known as the Mid-Central College Conference (MCCC) until after the 2011–12 school year) for most of its sports since the 1970–71 academic year; while its men's volleyball competes in the Wolverine–Hoosier Athletic Conference (WHAC).

Goshen competes in 14 intercollegiate varsity sports: Men's sports include baseball, basketball, cross country, soccer, tennis, track & field, and volleyball; while women's sports include basketball, cross country, soccer, softball, tennis, track & field and volleyball. Men's and women's bowling will be added in the fall of 2023, bringing the total sports teams to 16.

On October 7, 2022, Goshen College introduced Dash, the first official mascot in school history. The name was decided in a poll amongst faculty and students.

== Campus facilities ==
Goshen College has four dormitories, apartment living, and several small group houses. Outside the original quadrangle, Goshen's current campus has not been the result of a single master plan. Instead, the campus has evolved eclectically from building to building as the institution grew. Four-year residency was typical until the mid-1970s, when a growing student enrollment prompted school officials to forgo building new dormitories and allow upperclassmen to live off campus. In 2005, Goshen College announced its plan to return to four-year residency. With more students on campus, the school has spent over $10 million building and renovating dorms.

The Roman Gingerich Recreation and Fitness Center was constructed in 1994 with three full-sized basketball courts, four racquetball courts, a 200-meter indoor track, climbing wall, and weight room. The fitness center is open to all students and staff, and is used by community members as well.

The $24 million Music Center, completed in October 2002, has become regionally renowned for its design and acoustics. The Music Center consists of several main sections: Sauder Concert Hall, Rieth Recital Hall, the Art Gallery, and various classrooms, practice rooms and offices. Several highlights are a central recording studio, MIDI labs, and Taylor and Boody Opus 41, a 1600-pipe tracker pipe organ, the first in the world with tempering based on alumnus Bradley Lehman's research of Johann Sebastian Bach's notation. The facility was designed by Mathes Brierre Architects (design architects), Schmidt Associates (architects of record), and TALASKE (acoustics and audio consultants).

=== Sustainability ===
In 2007, then Goshen College President Jim Brenneman became a charter signatory to the American College & University Presidents Climate Commitment joining with leaders of 175 other higher education institutions that have agreed to neutralize greenhouse gas emissions on their campuses. In 2008, Rieth Village at Merry Lea Environmental Learning Center of Goshen College became the first platinum-rated LEED building in Indiana. In the spring of 2013, the college took the further step of purchasing 100 percent of its electricity from renewable sources through the procurement of renewable energy credits. A computerized building temperature regulation system, motion light sensors for indoor and outdoor lighting and open loop ground-source heat pumps further reduce energy consumption on campus. The campus has also converted nearly 20 percent of its lawn space to native plants and prairie restoration. Goshen College students and staff have developed a food composting system, planted a community garden, built a solar hot water collection system and continued to reduce energy consumption campus-wide. In 2014, the college earned a silver rating from the Sustainability Tracking, Assessment and Rating System (STARS) report for its sustainability efforts. Through an aggressive energy reduction program and efficiency upgrades, Goshen College has reduced electric consumption by 25 percent and gas consumption by 23 percent since 2007.

=== Small Group Housing/Intentional Living Communities ===
Small Group Housing (SGH) and Intentional Living Communities (ILC) are housing options for juniors and seniors on Goshen's campus. Started in the 1970s, SGH/ILC offers students the opportunity to live in a house arrangement, with common kitchen and living spaces. The purpose of SGH/ILC is for students to develop another living experience alternative to dormitory life. Goshen College maintains that SGH living is a privilege, and students must apply as a group to live in a residence. An application board consisting of resident directors, spiritual life, and physical plant employees review all potential candidates in the spring for the next school year. Each group must create a housing plan, division of responsibility, show examples of volunteerism, and a commitment to better the Goshen campus, as well as resolve conflict. Other factors considered in the application process include house cumulative GPA, extracurricular involvement, median age of the group, and personal faculty recommendations. Houses are then rewarded to applying groups who exemplify high academic, moral, and volunteer efforts, based on objective and subjective review.

Goshen College students have also lived in local housing not associated with the college.

=== Satellite facilities ===
Goshen College maintains Merry Lea Environmental Center in Indiana, and the J.N. Roth Marine Biology Station in Layton, Florida.

Other properties maintained by Goshen College include Witmer Woods, a 13-acre (53,000 m^{2}) arboretum with over 100 native Indiana species, and the adjacent property College Cabin (Reservoir Place), used for special events, along the Elkhart River and Millrace.

== Notable people ==
Goshen's motto, "Culture for Service" is evident in many graduates and faculty. Below is a partial list of notable people who have been associated with the college:

- Stephen Ainlay – 18th president of Union College
- David P. Bartel (1982) – professor of biology at Massachusetts Institute of Technology
- Philip A. Beachy – professor at Stanford University School of Medicine, and an Associate at Stanford's Institute of Stem Cell Biology and Regenerative Medicine
- Roger N. Beachy (1966) – director of the National Institute of Food and Agriculture (NIFA)
- Harold S. Bender – author, professor, college dean, founder of Mennonite Quarterly Review
- Howard Dyck – conductor and radio broadcaster
- Girl Named Tom – sibling singers Caleb Liechty (2018), Joshua Liechty (2019), and Bekah Liechty who won season 21 of The Voice
- Denise Konan (1988) – dean of the College of Social Sciences at the University of Hawaii at Manoa
- Errick McCollum – professional basketball player who plays for Anadolu Efes of the Turkish Basketball Super League and the EuroLeague
- Carrie Newcomer – singer, songwriter and author who has received numerous awards for her music and related charitable activities
- Sofia Samatar (1993) – author of A Stranger in Olondria
- Katie Sowers – football coach
- James C. Strouse (1999) – screenwriter and director
- Ellah Wakatama Allfrey – senior Research Fellow at Manchester University
- David Waltner-Toews (1971) – writer
- Rudy Wiebe – novelist

== Center for Intercultural Teaching and Learning ==
On October 25, 2006, Goshen College announced that it was the recipient of a $12.5 million Lilly grant to create the Center for Intercultural Teaching and Learning (CITL). The purpose of this grant was to research challenges that come with changing demographics in rural towns with small colleges. Goshen College is located in Elkhart County which had a large and rapidly growing Latino population at the time (12.6 percent of the population in 2006). Despite growing minority populations, Indiana's minority enrollment in its colleges and universities has only increased two percent.

== Traditions ==
- Goshen's school colors, purple and white, were modeled after Northwestern University, where President Byers attended and after which he wanted to model Goshen
- One of the college's many traditions is "sampling" sap from the city of Goshen's official Maple Tree, located on campus, and "testing" how many more weeks of winter there will be. Professors from the science department bring out their equipment with much fanfare to determine the official length of winter. In 2006, the maple tree was removed because of disease rotting the hardwood and was replaced by a new tree, now the official maple tree of Goshen. In 2007, new president Jim Brenneman replaced this tradition (which probably resulted in the early death of the maple) with "Weather or Not Day"; a day celebrating Northern Indiana's fickle weather
- Early (1925) advertisements for the college were refreshingly direct. One said "Goshen [is] not the best college in the United States. But it is better than the rest for Mennonite young people."

=== College seal ===
Goshen College seal signifies the book that all alumni have signed since graduation, and the lamp signifies the enlightenment that comes with education. As a Christian school, the book also signifies the importance of word, as well as God's call for his people to be "light to the world."

== Campus ==
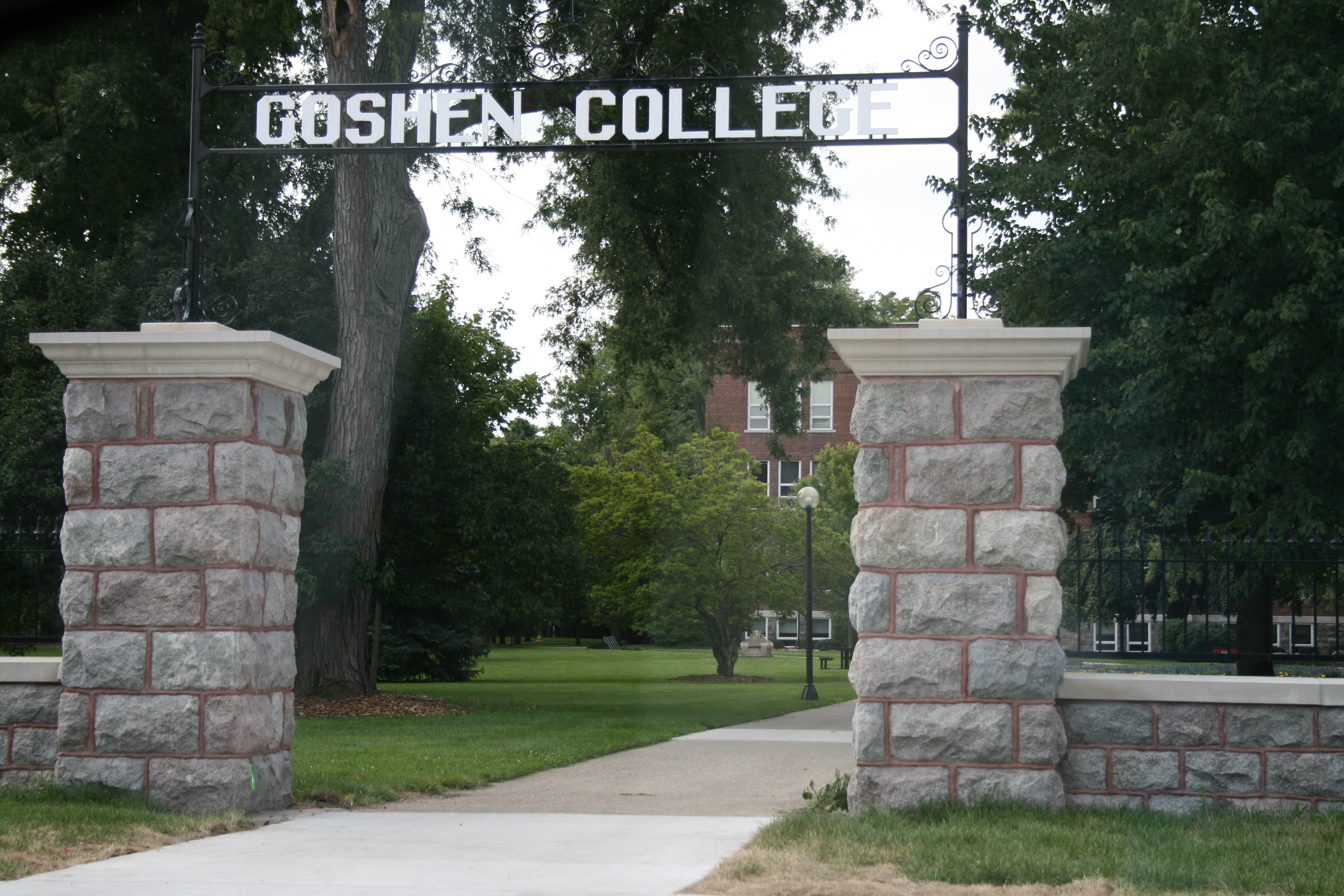
Goshen College Gate

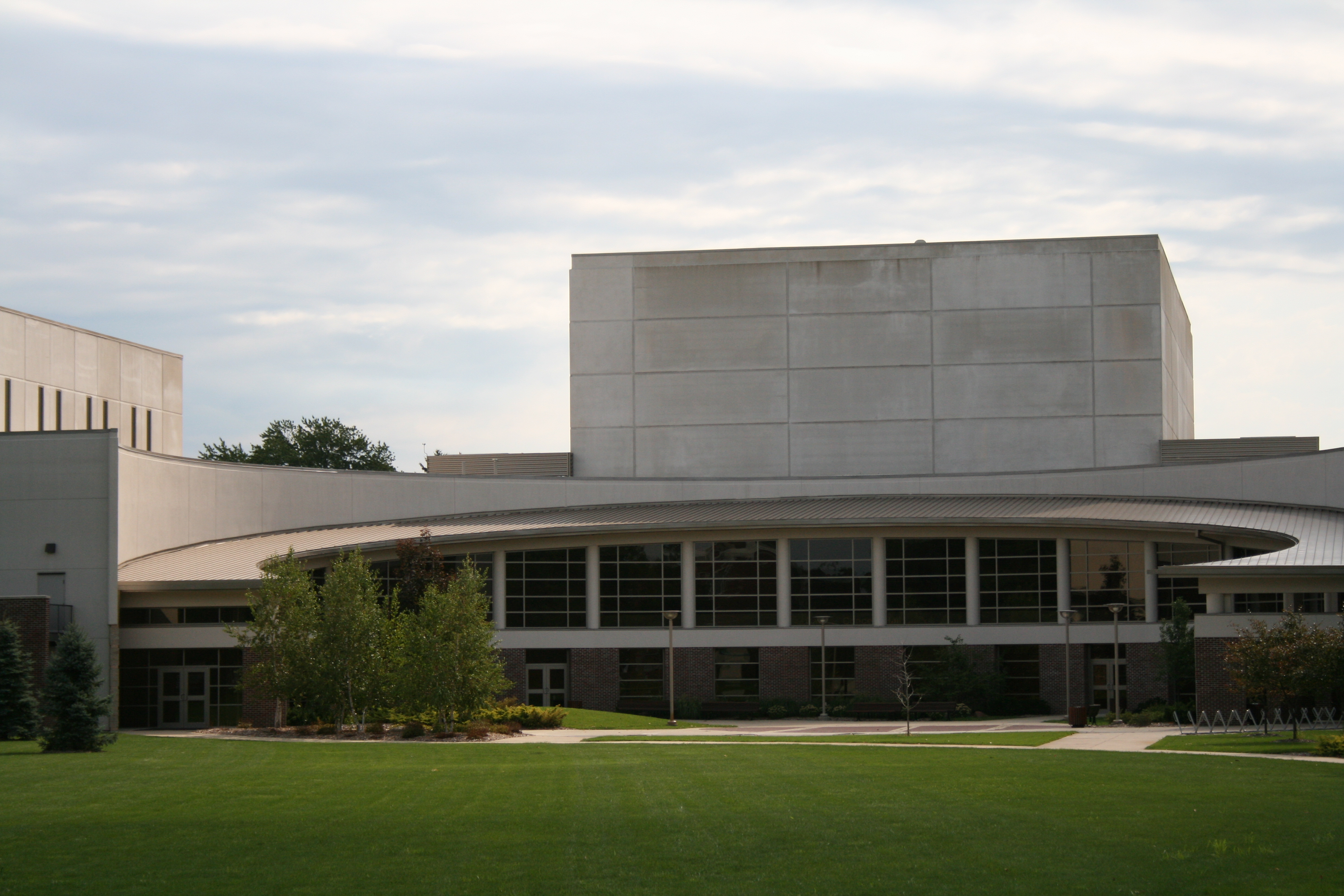
Goshen College Music Center

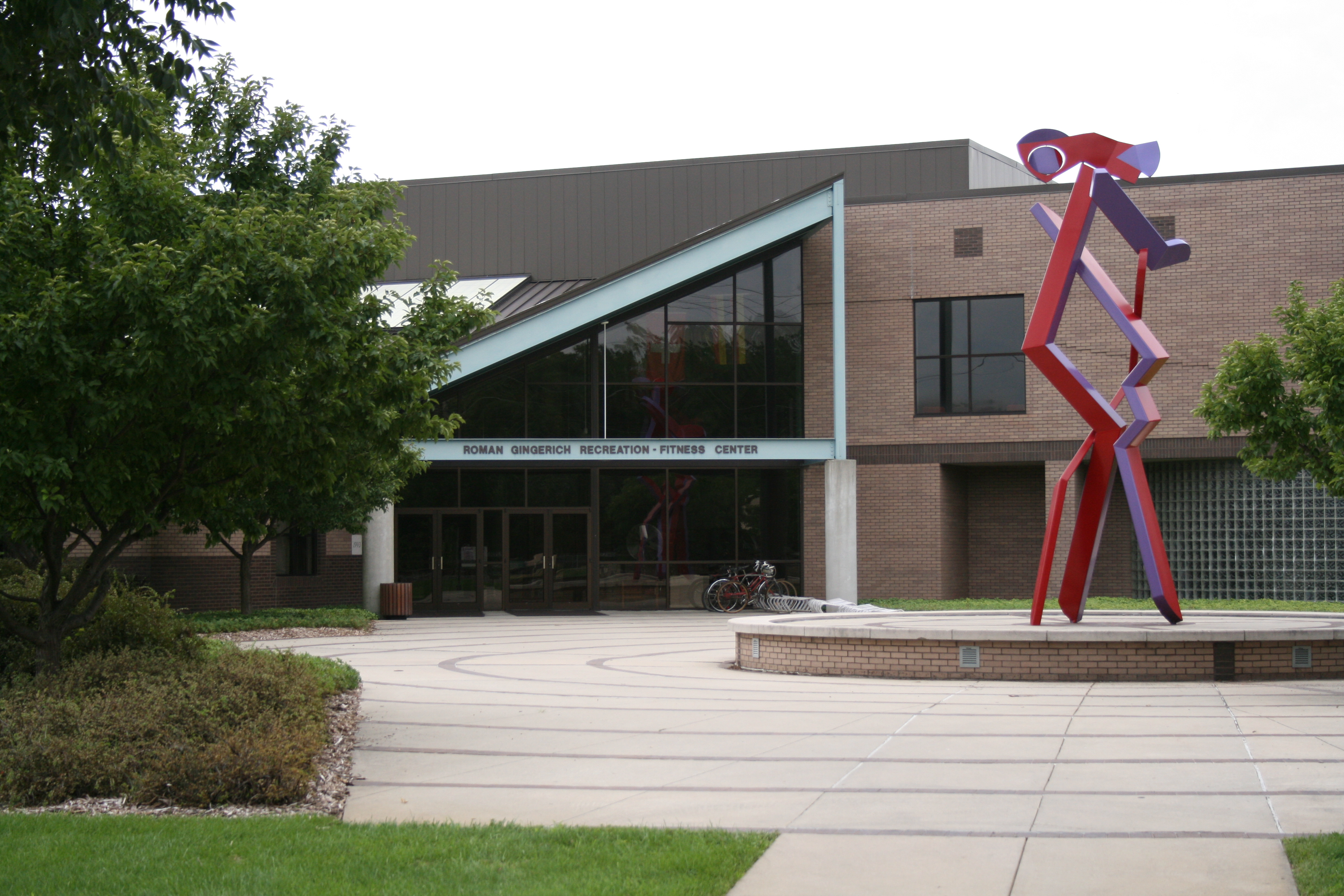
Roman Gingerich Recreation - Fitness Center

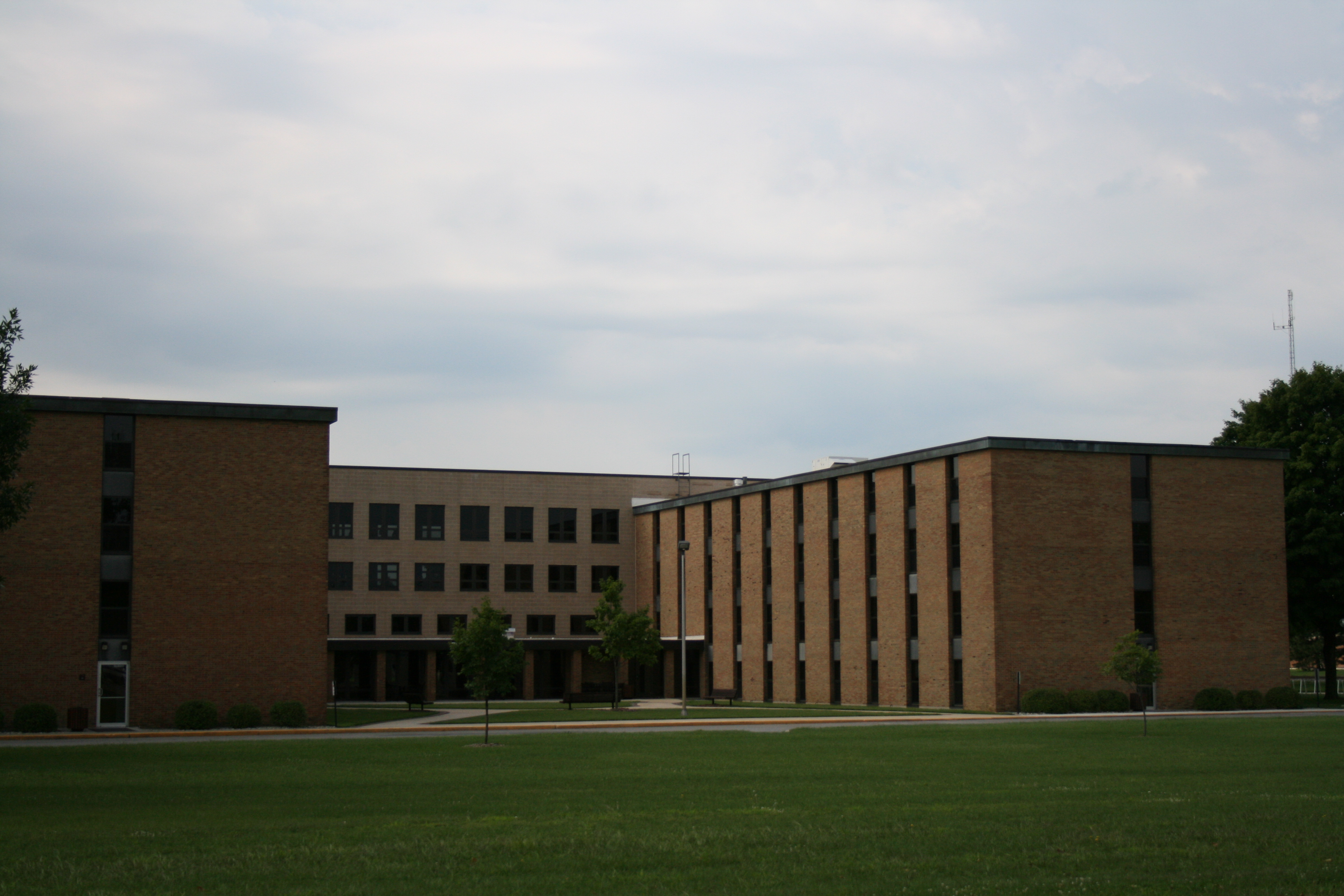
Kratz and Miller dormitories

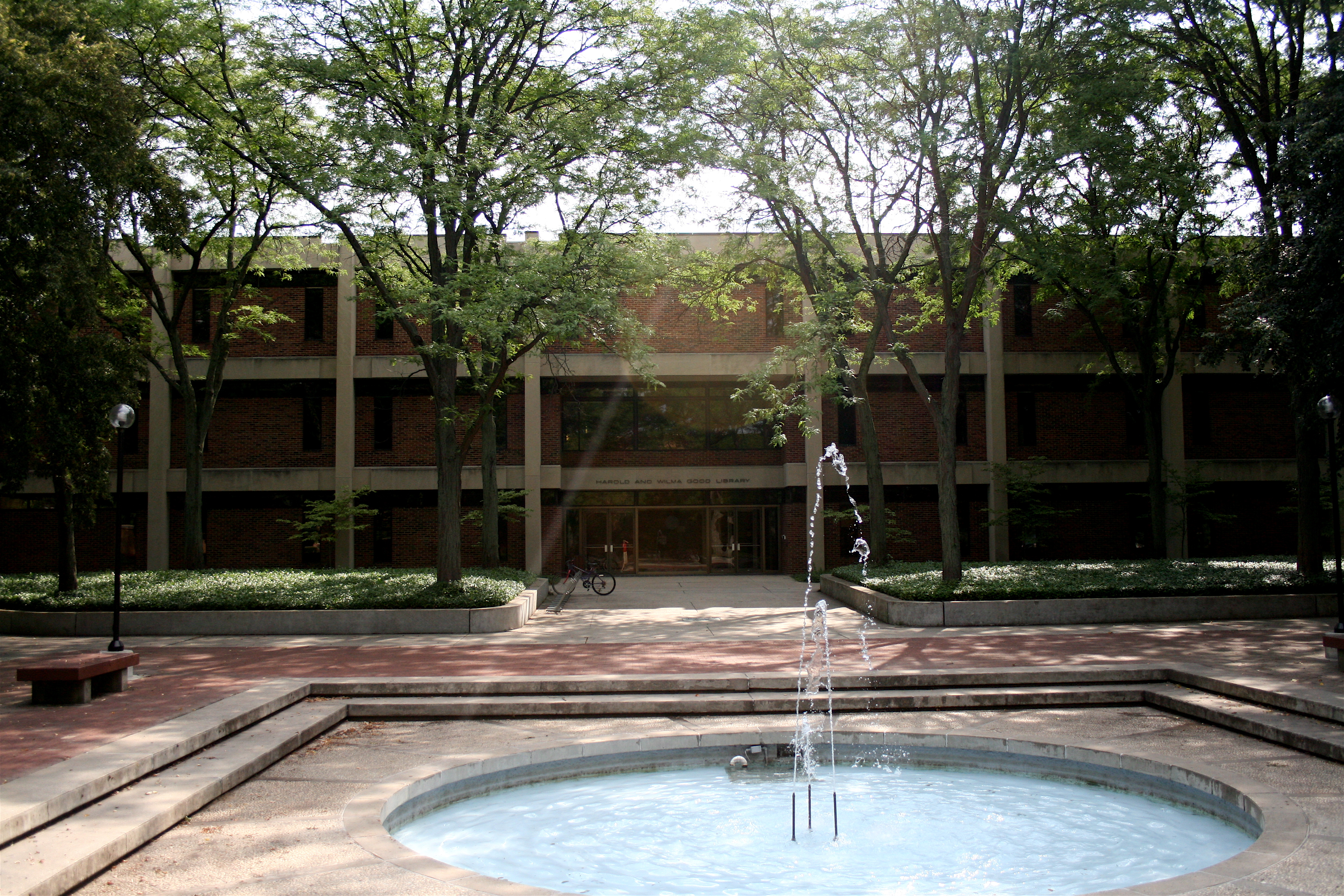
Harold and Wilma Good Library
