= Amish way of life =

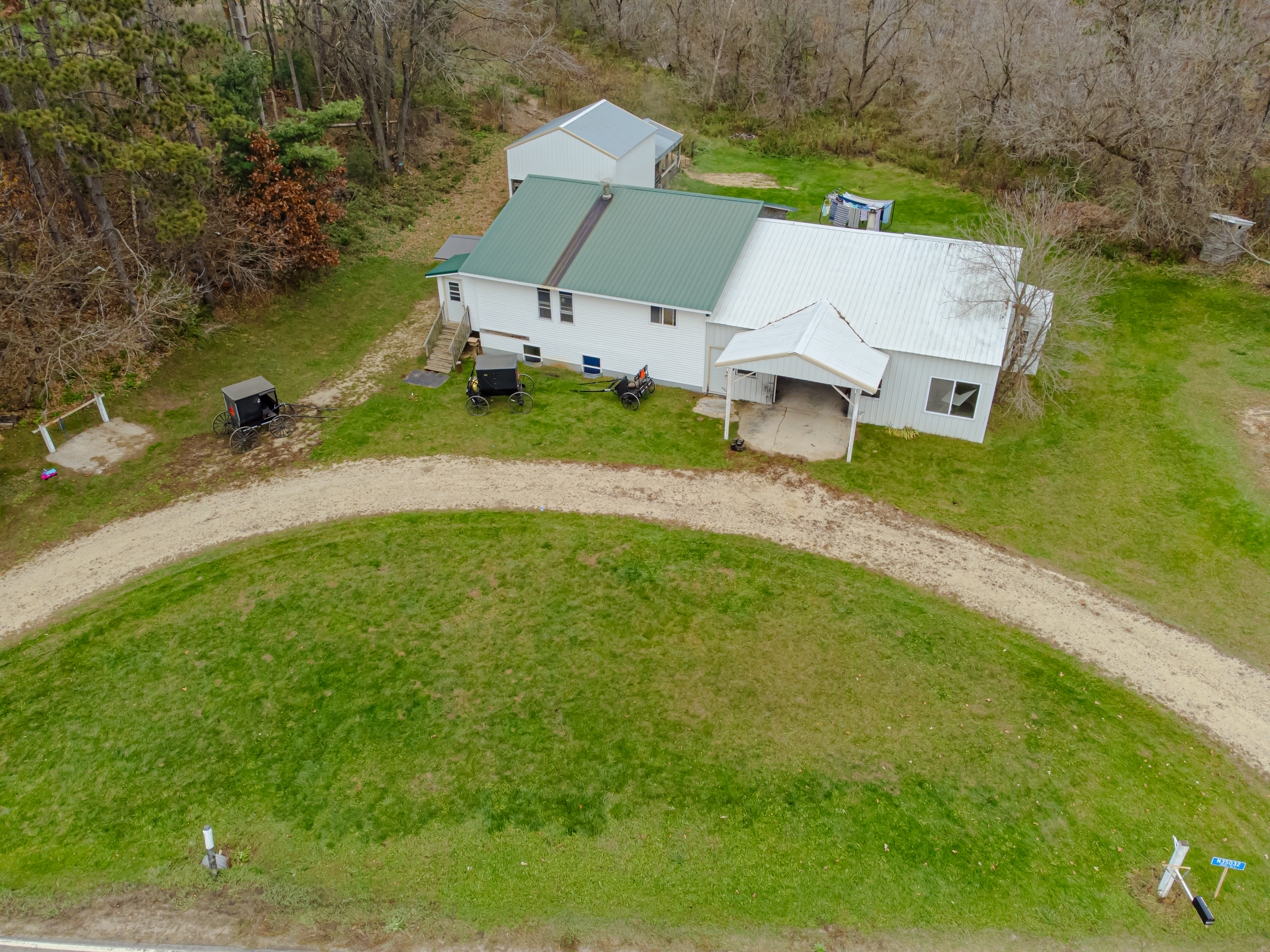
Amish house

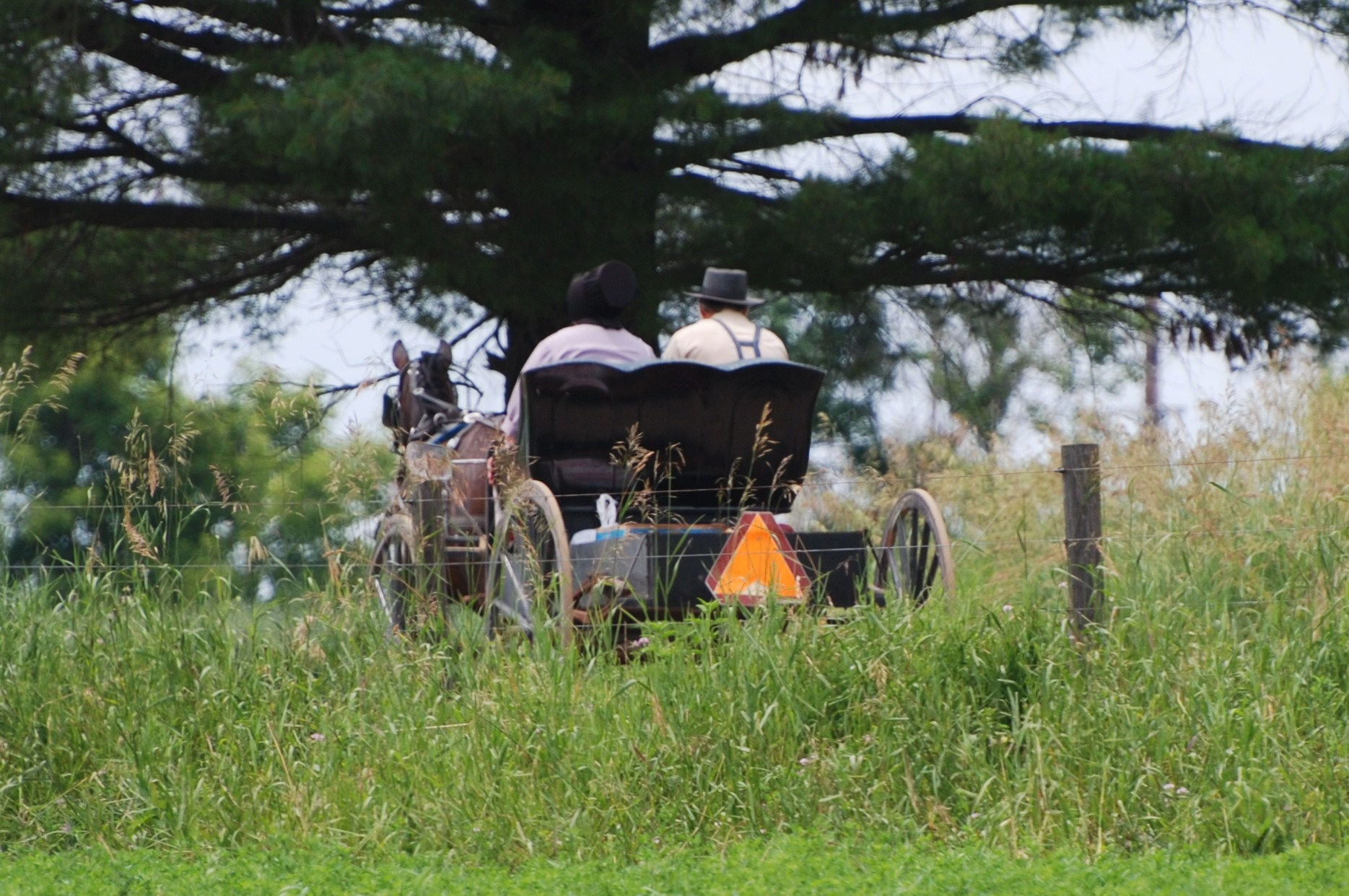
An open top buggy

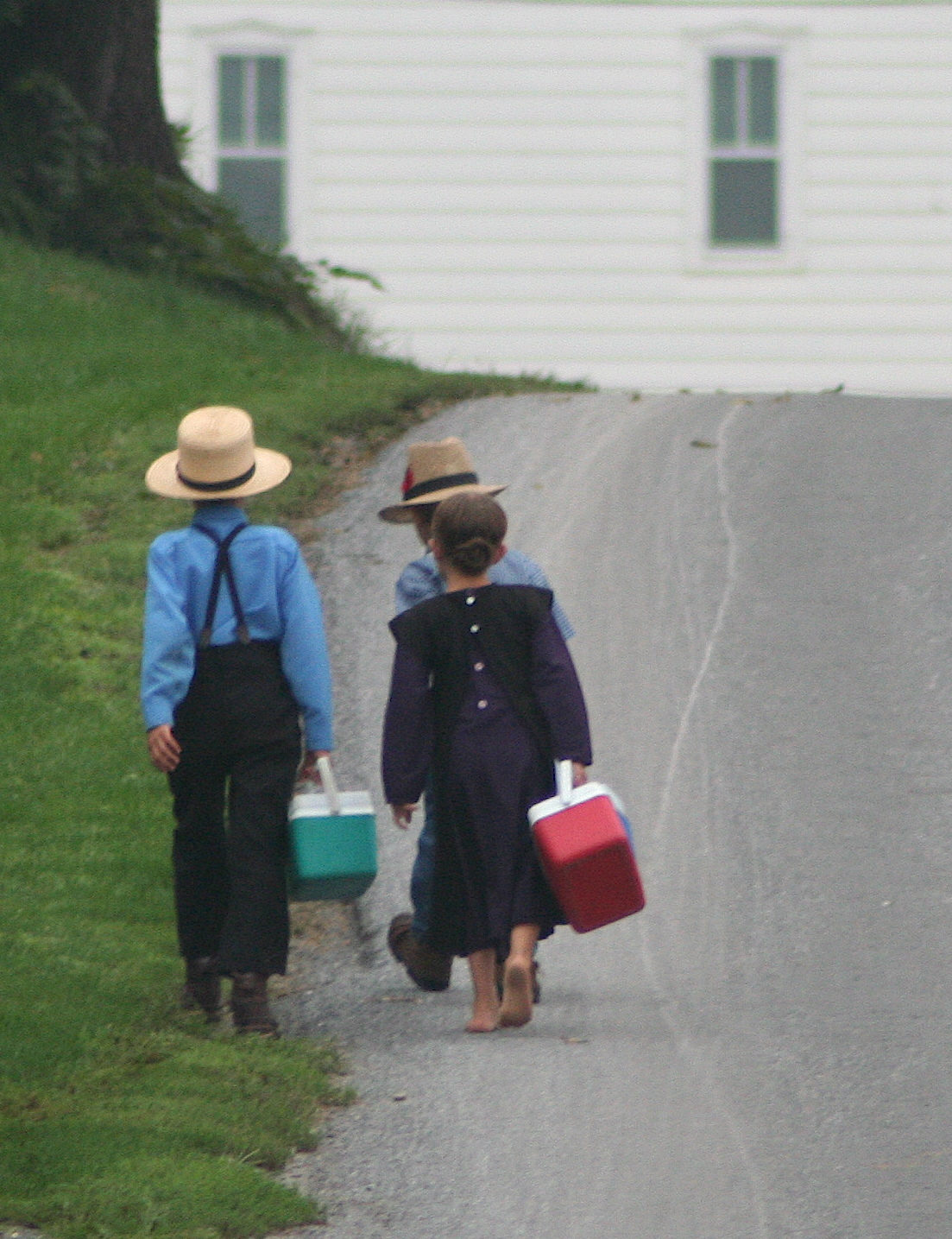
Amish schoolchildren

The Amish, a branch of Anabaptist Christianity, maintain a lifestyle that is culturally distinct from typical North American culture. They believe their culture reflects biblical values or that a traditional agrarian lifestyle is superior to current cultural trends. For example, the Amish believe large families are a blessing from God, so families with a dozen or more children are not uncommon. Family life is considered more important than economic success, so the elderly and handicapped are not sent to care facilities but are provided for at home. Known for their avoidance of modern technology, the decisions about what is to be used and what is to be avoided are made by the group, not the individual. These decisions are based either upon biblical practices or traditions that have been passed down, with the well-being of the community considered more valuable than the desires of the individual.

Practices vary widely among Amish subgroups, from the Beachy Amish, who use electricity, automobiles, smartphones, and colorful clothing, to the most traditional Swartzentruber Amish, who avoid owning or using any of these.

== Family and personal life ==
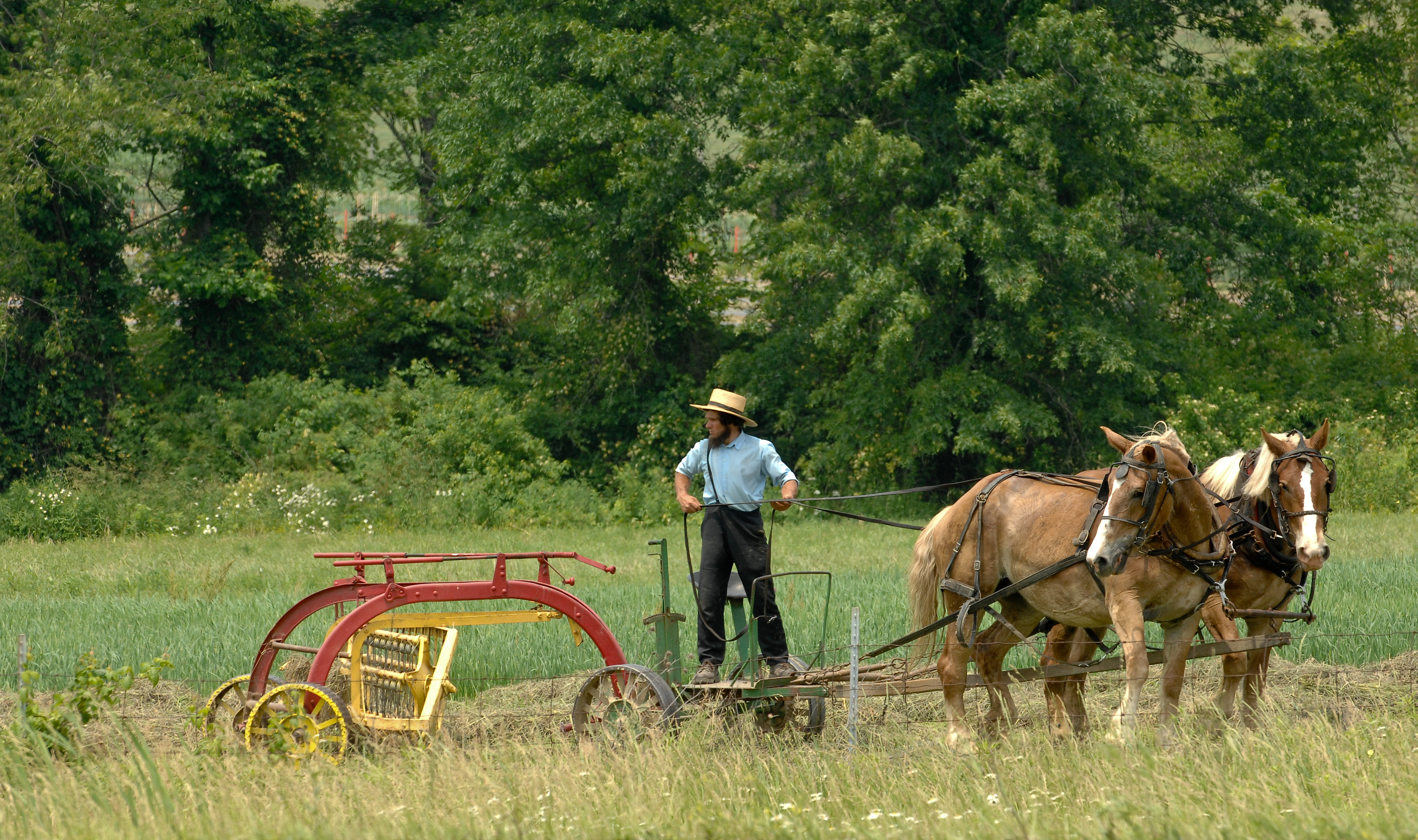
Amish man operating a hay rake in southeast Ohio

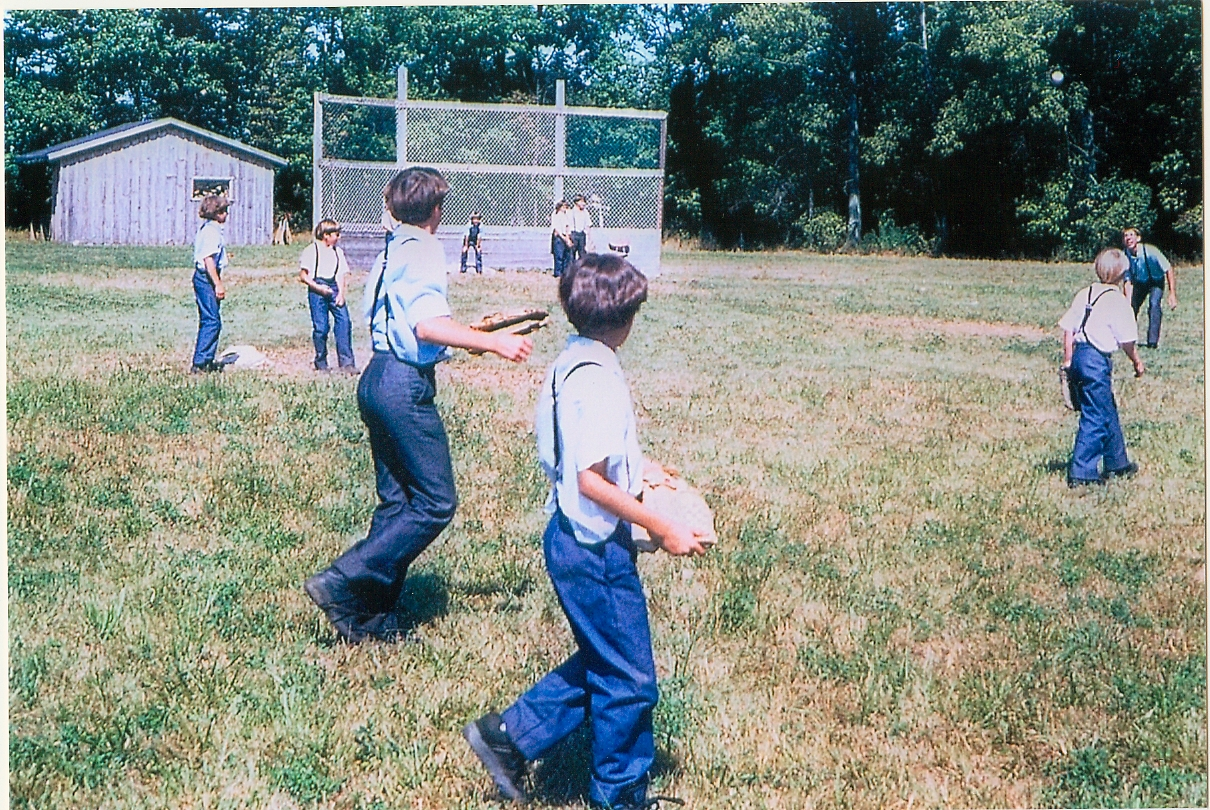
Amish children playing baseball, Lyndonville, New York

Socializing with neighbors and relatives is also an important family function in the Amish culture.

The family and church take precedence over the individual throughout life. A church district is measured by the number of families (households) rather than the number of baptized persons. Families take turns hosting the biweekly preaching service. Parents are accountable to the Lord for the spiritual welfare of their children.

Chores within the home are typically divided by gender. Formal education ends after eighth grade, after which the children are trained for their adult tasks. Boys work with their fathers on the farm or family business, or perhaps begin working for neighbors. Girls work inside the home and garden alongside their mothers, with some helping other young mothers or even working in a local workshop, or taking on schoolteaching. Pursuing higher education is extremely rare.

=== Youth and courtship ===
Rumspringa (Pennsylvania German lit. "jumping or running around") is the period of adolescence that begins at about 16 years of age and often ending with a serious courtship and marriage. In some communities, a certain amount of misbehavior is expected, but this misbehavior is neither encouraged nor overlooked. Popular non-Amish perceptions of Rumspringa do not reflect the typical practices. At the end of this period, Amish young adults are baptized into the church and usually marry, with marriage permitted only among church members. A small percentage of young people choose not to join the church, deciding to live the rest of their lives in broader society and marry someone outside the community.

Courting begins at sixteen (in some communities, the girl may be as young as fourteen). The most common event for boy-girl association is the bi-weekly Sunday evening "sing." Other social interaction among youth happens at sewing bees, frolics, and weddings. The "sing" is often in the same house or barn as the Sunday morning service. Teens may arrive from several nearby districts, thus providing socialization on a broader scale than from a single church.

At the "sing", boys are on one side of a long table and girls on the other. Songs are chosen by individuals, with conversation interspersed between songs. The formal end of the "sing" is at about ten o'clock, after which there is talking, joking, and visiting. The boys who do not have a girlfriend may pair up with a Maidel (girl). Following this, the boy takes the girl home in his open-topped courting buggy.

Cousin marriage between first-cousins is prohibited among the Amish, but second-cousin relationships are permitted. Marriage to a "Schwartz" cousin, the first cousin, once removed, is not permitted in Lancaster County, Pennsylvania, the oldest and largest Amish settlement.

The onset of courtship is usually not openly discussed within the family or among friends. Excessive teasing by siblings or friends at the wrong time is considered invasive. Respecting privacy, or at least pretending not to know, is a prevailing mode of behavior, even among parents.

— Amish Society, Hostetler (Fourth Edition), p. 146.

=== Weddings ===
Weddings may be held at any time of the year, but different Amish groups have a "wedding season" (during the time when farm work is slower) when most weddings take place. The bride may pick whatever color wedding dress she desires. She wears no makeup and will not receive an engagement or wedding ring because the Ordnung prohibits personal jewelry. The wedding ceremony may take several hours, followed by a community reception with a banquet and singing. Newlyweds spend the wedding night at the home of the bride's parents.

Celery used to be one of the symbolic foods served at Amish weddings. Celery would also be used instead of flowers to decorate the house.

=== Retirement ===
Amish tend not to have a set retirement age, generally working until they are unable to do so. Older people are not sent to a retirement facility, but remain at home. There is often an adjacent dwelling comparable to a mother-in-law property called the Grossdaadi Haus or Daudy Haus in which grandparents reside. Older people maintain social contacts through community events, such as frolics, auctions, weddings, and holidays. If older adults become ill or infirm, the family will take turns caring for them.

== Lifestyle and culture ==
Amish lifestyle is dictated by the Ordnung (German, meaning: order), which differs slightly from community to community, and, within a community, from district to district. What is acceptable in one community may not be acceptable in another. Groups may separate over matters such as the width of a hat brim, the color of buggies, or various other issues. The use of tobacco and alcohol is accepted within some groups, but other groups have taken a stand against them.

=== Language ===
Most Old Order Amish speak a distinctive German dialect called Pennsylvania German or, much more commonly, Pennsylvania Dutch. Pennsylvania German is related to the Palatinate German of the 18th century, but has been strongly influenced by American English. The English term "Dutch" originally referred to all forms of German and Netherlandic languages. Pennsylvania German, which is a High German dialect, is distinct from Mennonite Low German and Hutterite German dialects spoken by other Anabaptist groups.

Now spoken primarily by the Old Order Amish and Old Order Mennonites, Pennsylvania German was originally spoken by many German-American immigrants in Pennsylvania and surrounding areas, especially those who came prior to 1800. There are also several sizable Old Order Amish communities where a variety of Swiss German is spoken, rather than Pennsylvania German. The Beachy Amish, especially those who were born after 1960, tend to speak in English at home. All other Amish groups use either Pennsylvania German or a variety of Swiss German as their in-group language of discourse. Small dialectal variations exist between communities, such as Lancaster County and Indiana speech varieties. The Amish are aware of regional variation, and occasionally experience difficulty in understanding speakers from outside their own area.

=== Clothing ===
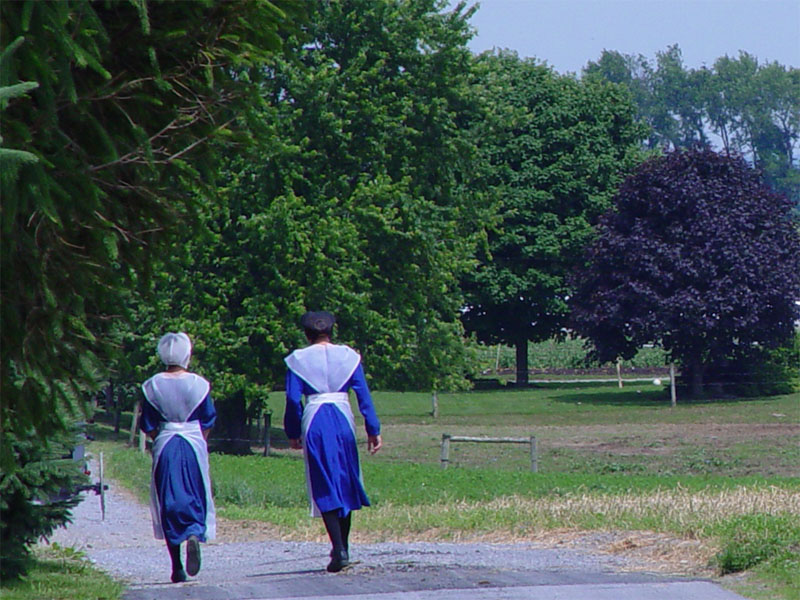
Amish girls in Lancaster County, Pennsylvania

The common theme among all Amish clothing is plainness; clothing should not call attention to the wearer by cut, color, or any other feature. Hook-and-eye closures or straight pins are used as fasteners on dress clothing rather than buttons, zippers, or velcro. Snaps are used on everyday clothes, and plain buttons for work shirts and trousers. The historic restriction on buttons is attributed to tradition and their potential for ostentation. Some groups tend to limit color to black (trousers, dresses) and white (shirts), while others allow muted colors. Dark blue denim work clothing is common within some groups as well. Amish often sew their own clothing.

Women wear cape dresses, calf-length plain-cut dresses in a solid color. Aprons are often worn at home, usually, in white (typically for the unmarried) or purple or black (for the married), and are always worn when attending church. A cape, which consists of a triangular piece of cloth, is usually worn, beginning around the teenage years, and pinned into the apron. In the colder months, a long woolen cloak may be worn. Heavy bonnets are worn over the prayer coverings (known as the kapp) when Amish women are out and about in cold weather, with the exception of the Nebraska Amish, who do not wear bonnets. Girls in some areas may wear colored bonnets until age nine; older girls and women wear black bonnets. Girls begin wearing a cape for church and dress-up occasions at about age eight. Single women wear a white cape to church until about the age of thirty. Everyday capes are colored, matching the dress, until about age forty when only black is used.

Men typically wear dark-colored trousers, some with a dark vest or coat, suspenders (in some communities), broad-brimmed straw hats in the warmer months, and black felt hats in the colder months. Some teenagers, may deviate from these customs to convey individuality. Married men and those over forty grow a beard, although Swartzentruber Amish young men usually never shave, except for the mustache, which is not permitted in most Amish churches because of tradition. In some Old Order Amish settings, a beard may serve the same symbolic function as a wedding ring, marking the status as a married man.

=== Furniture ===
Amish furniture is furniture marketed as being made by the Amish, primarily of Pennsylvania, Ohio, and Indiana. It is generally known as being made of 100% wood, usually without particle board or laminate. Amish furniture making is often a skill passed through many generations. Because Amish beliefs prevent the use of electricity, many woodworking tools in Amish shops are powered by hydraulic and pneumatic power that is run on diesel generators. No piece of furniture is ever identical to another because of the care taken to select the wood. The grain is different on every piece of wood, and the craftsmen often try to highlight the features of each individual piece.

=== Education ===
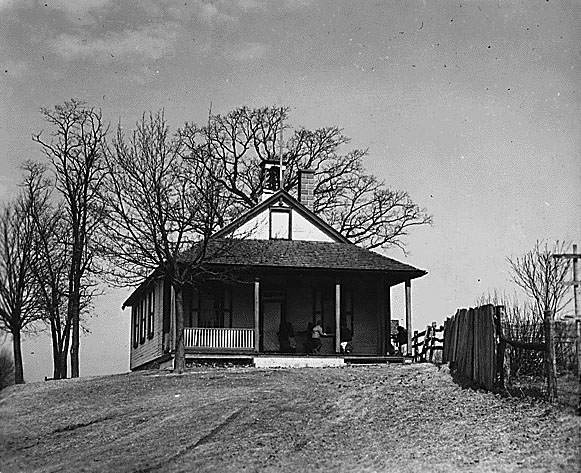
Amish schoolhouse in Lancaster County, Pennsylvania in 1941

The Amish do not educate their children past the eighth grade, believing that the basic knowledge offered up to that point is sufficient to prepare one for the Amish lifestyle. Almost no Amish go to high school, much less to college. In many communities, the Amish operate their own schools, which are typically one-room schoolhouses with teachers (young unmarried or married men and women) from the Amish community. In Indiana, Amish Children go to public schools from kindergarten to eighth grade. These schools provide education in many crafts and therefore qualify as vocational education, fulfilling the nationwide requirement of education through the tenth grade or its equivalent.

There are Amish children who go to non-Amish public schools, even schools that are far away and that include a very small Amish population. For instance, there have been some Amish children who have attended Leesburg Elementary School in Leesburg, Indiana (about 12 mi (19 km) from Nappanee, Indiana), because their families lived on the edge of the school district. In the past, there have been major conflicts between the Amish and outsiders over these matters of local schooling; for the most part, they have been resolved, and the educational authorities allow the Amish to educate their children in their own ways.

Sometimes, there are conflicts between the state-mandated minimum age for discontinuing schooling, and the younger age of children who have completed the eighth grade. The Amish claim that educating their children beyond eighth grade is a violation of their religious beliefs, and so, have been granted exemptions of this mandate. In the past, in comparisons of standardized test scores of Amish students, the Amish have performed above the national average for rural public school pupils in spelling, word usage, and arithmetic. They performed below the national average in vocabulary.

On May 19, 1972, Jonas Yoder and Wallace Miller of the Old Order Amish, and Adin Yutzy of the Conservative Amish Mennonite Church, were each fined $5 for refusing to send their children, aged 14 and 15, to high school. In Wisconsin v. Yoder, the Wisconsin Supreme Court overturned the conviction, and the U.S. Supreme Court affirmed this, finding the benefits of universal education do not justify a violation of the Free Exercise Clause of the First Amendment.

=== Music ===
Amish music is primarily German in origin, including ancient singing styles not found anywhere in Europe. Sacred music originates from modern hymns derived from the Pennsylvania Dutch culture.

Singing is a major part of Amish churches and some songs take over fifteen minutes to sing. "Lob Lied" is a well-known Amish song. It is always the second song sung at an Amish church service and is often sung at Amish weddings.

Older Amish hymns are monophonic, without meter, and feature drawn-out tones with slowly articulated ornamentation. Pennsylvania spirituals are more contemporary and include a wide variety of influences. Although a few Amish learn to play traditional instruments such as the harmonica or the accordion, instruments are not played in public. Thus, singing is usually unaccompanied.

"Sings" or "Singings" are attended by young people approaching marriage-age. They are usually held in barns on a Sunday evening after a worship service and are an essential element in Amish courting practices as the young participants are encouraged to engage in social discourse between songs.

While singing in church is in German, singing outside of the church is more often in English than in Pennsylvania German, even though the Amish know many traditional worldly Pennsylvania German songs. The most popular performer of worldly Pennsylvania German songs is John Schmid, who is also very popular among the Amish.

=== Transport ===
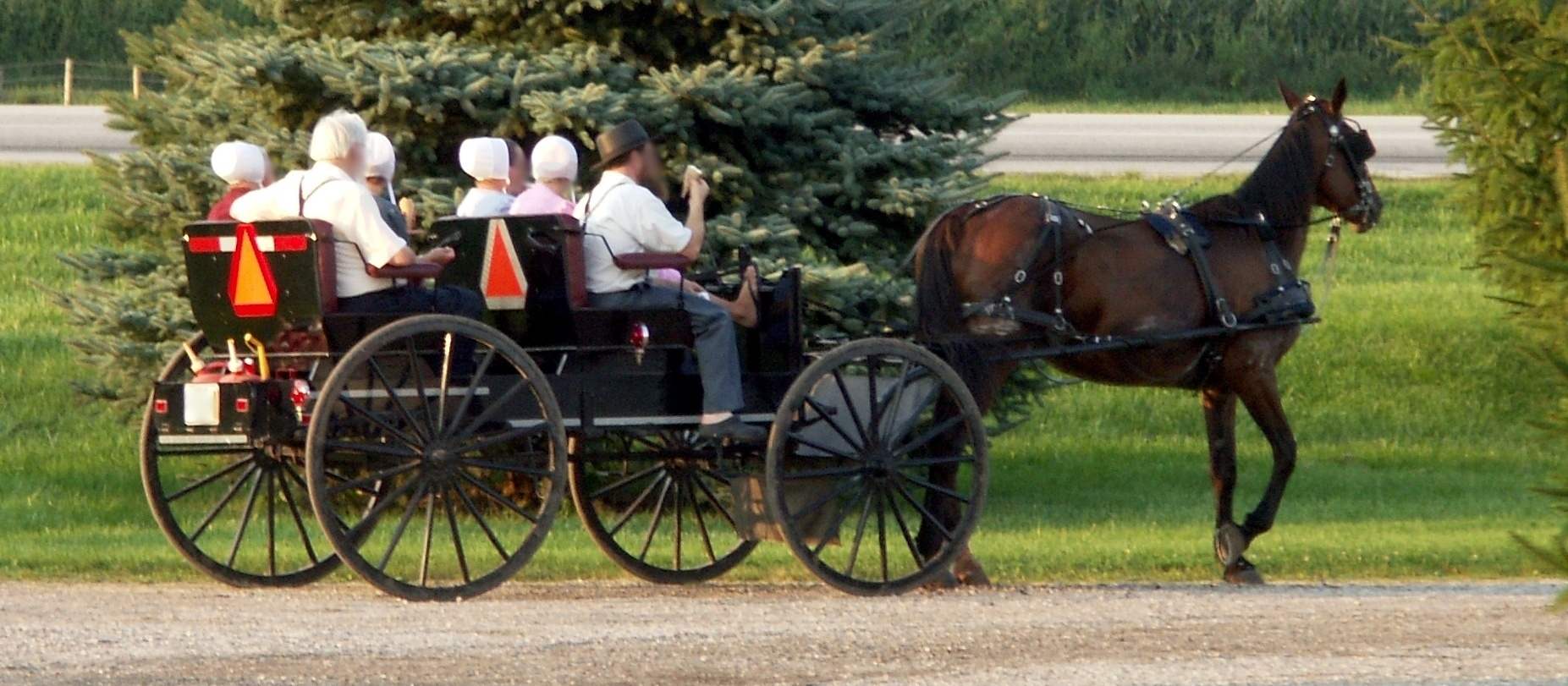
Horse-drawn transport

Amish people are more likely to die in traffic accidents when motor vehicles collide with the slower horse-drawn Amish buggies. In Pennsylvania between 2003 and 2013, over 600 buggy accidents took place. Levi Shetler, of the conservative Swartzentruber Amish, was reported to have been involved in fourteen crashes by the age of 54, with one fatality. The usual crash is during daylight on straight roadways with no adverse weather conditions, with a cause of "following too closely", resulting in a rear-end crash to the buggy.

== Use of modern technology ==
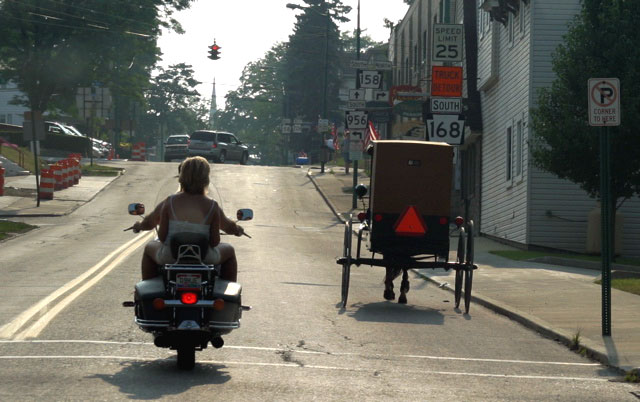
Motorcycle and Amish buggy share the road in New Wilmington, Pennsylvania

The Older Order Amish avoid certain modern technologies. Amish do not view technology as evil, and individuals may petition for acceptance of a particular technology in the local community. In Pennsylvania, bishops meet in the spring and fall to discuss common concerns, including the appropriate response to new technology, and then pass this information on to ministers and deacons in a subsequent meeting. Because of this flat governing structure, variations of practice develop in each community.

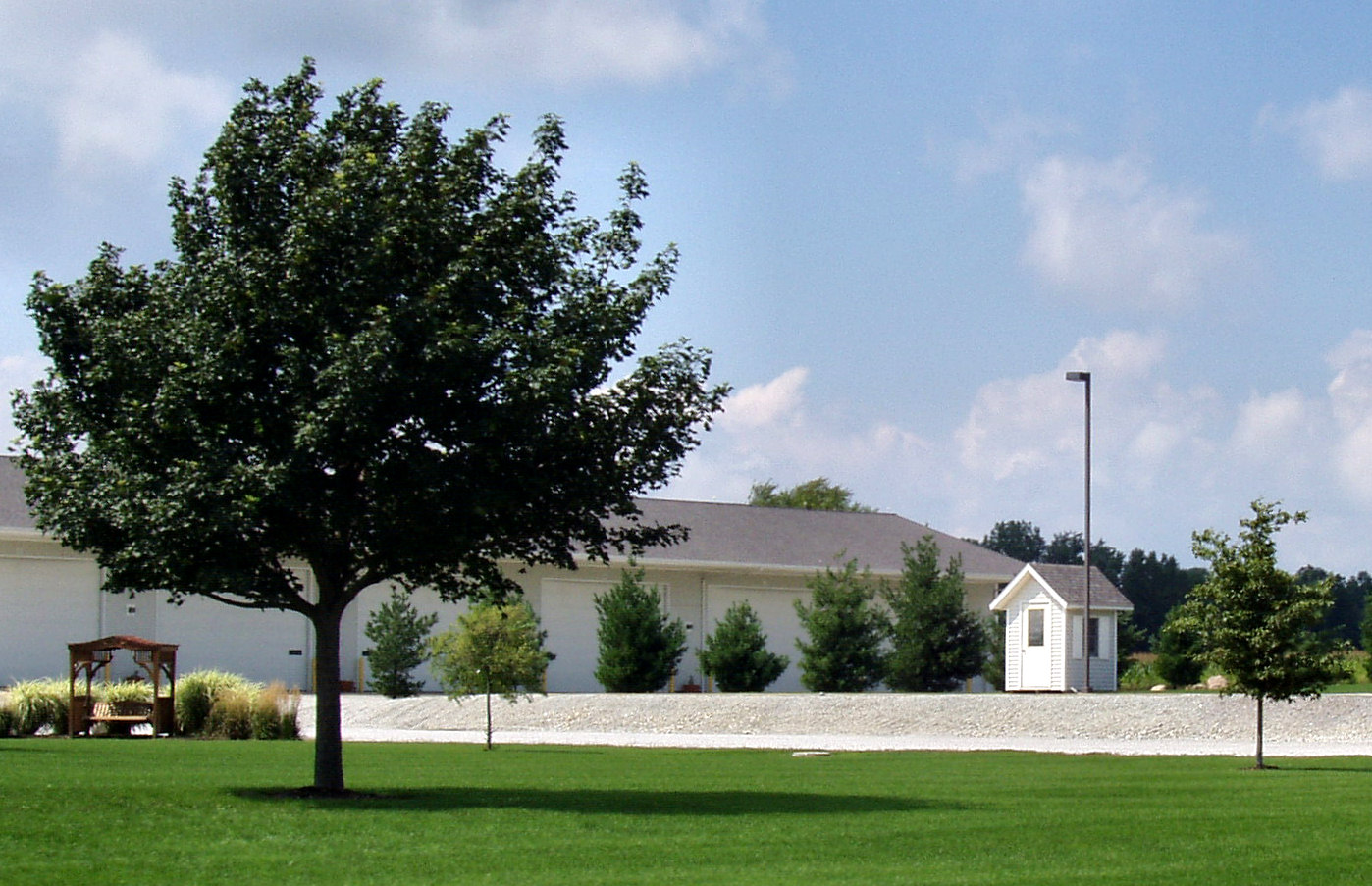
Telephone booth set up by an "English" farmer for emergency use by local Amish families

High voltage electricity was rejected by 1920 through the actions of a strict bishop as a reaction against more liberal Amish and to avoid a physical connection to the outside world. Gasoline-powered farm equipment, such as tillers or mowers, may be pushed by a human or pulled by a horse. Amish farmers employ chemical pesticides, chemical fertilizers, and artificial insemination of cows.

The Ordnung is the guide to community standards and a doctrine that defines sin. For example, the four Old Order Amish communities of Allen County, Indiana, are more conservative than most; they use open buggies during the winter and wear black leather shoes even in the hot summer.

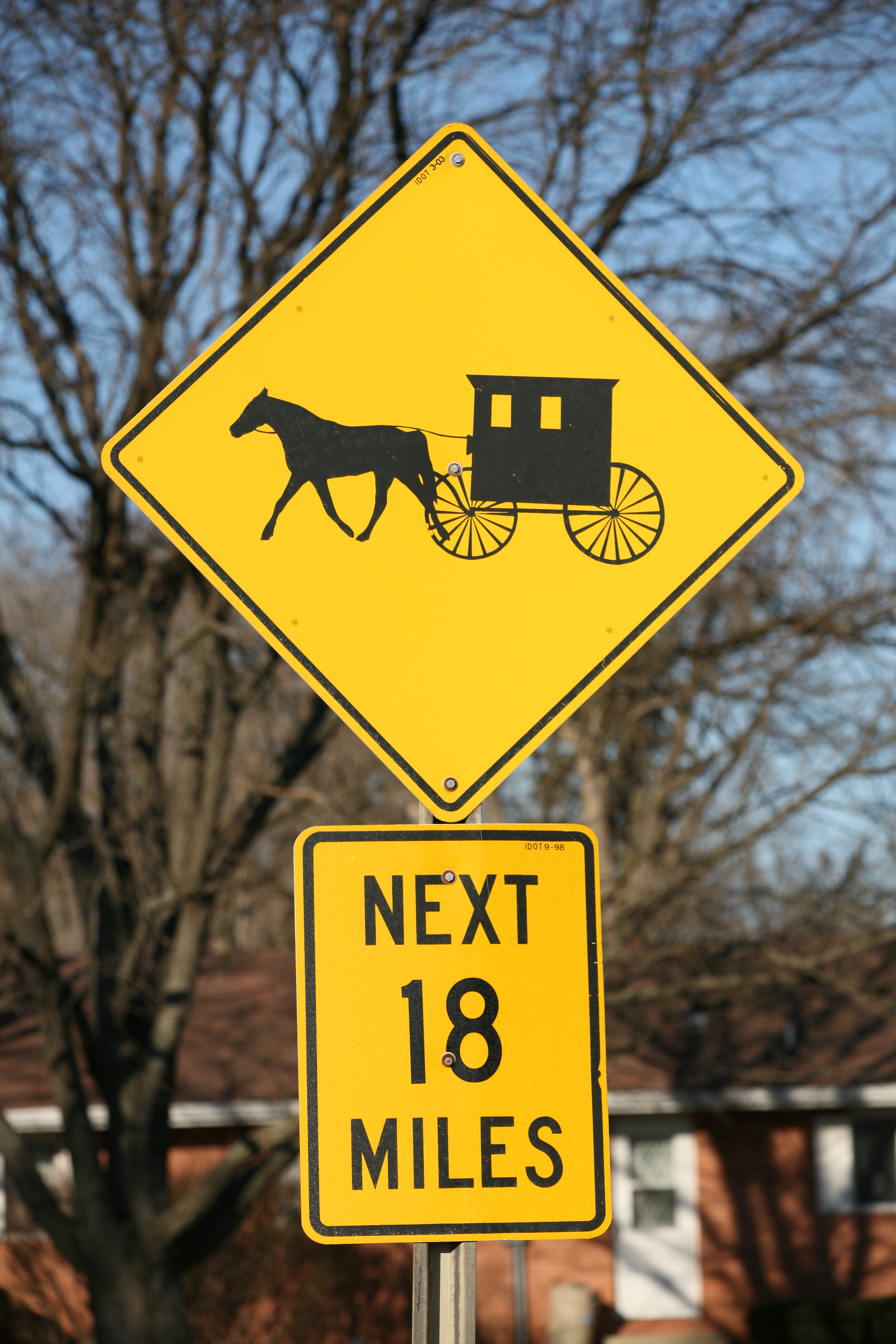
Signs erected in areas with Old Order Amish, Old Order Mennonite or members of a few different Old Order Brethren groups, alerting motorists to the presence of horse-drawn vehicles

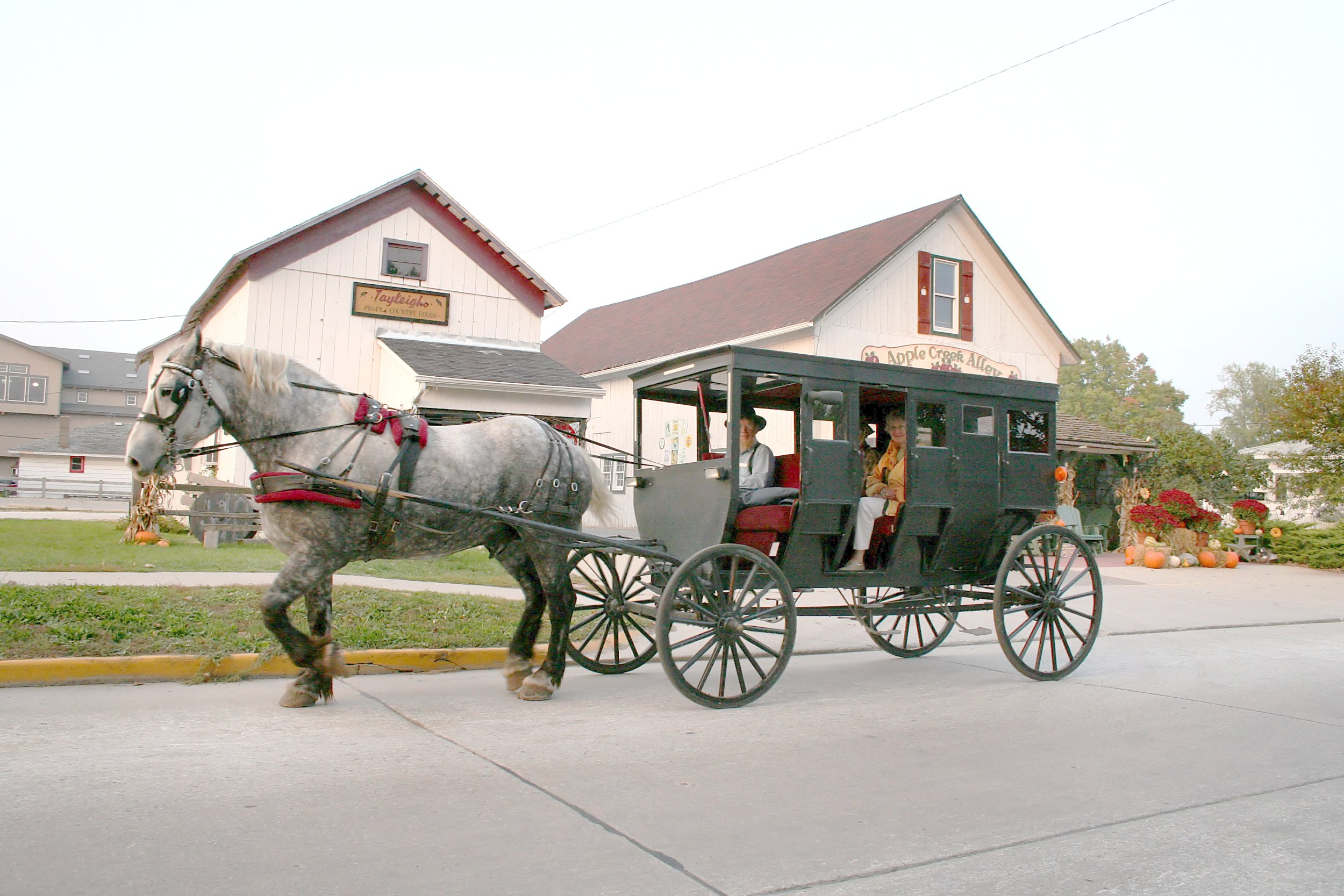
Carriage rides for tourists in Shipshewana, Indiana

Restrictions are not meant to impose suffering. Disabled people are allowed to use motorized wheelchairs; electricity is allowed in the home for medical equipment. Those who break the rules may be given many months to resolve the problem so that they can remove electric wiring from a new house.

Although most Amish will not drive cars, they will hire drivers and vans, for example, for visiting family, weekly grocery shopping, or commuting to the workplace off the farm. However, this, too, is subject to local regulation and variation. The practice increases the geographic reach of the Amish and decreases isolation: a horse can travel only about 25 miles (40 km), and it must rest for a considerable period, restricting the Amish to a radius of 12.5 miles (20.1 km) from home. Moreover, a horse and buggy can only sustain 10 mph (16 km/h) over an extended distance, and thus is impractical for emergencies. The Amish are permitted to travel by bus and train to shop, work at markets, and reach more distant destinations. Regular bus service between Amish communities has been established in some areas. The Amish are not permitted to travel by airplane as air travel is considered too modern.

The Old Order Amish tend to restrict telephone use, as some view it as interfering with separation from the world. It intrudes into the privacy and sanctity of the family and interferes with the social community by eliminating face-to-face communication. Amish of Lancaster County uses the telephone primarily for outgoing calls, with the added restriction that the telephone should not be inside the house but rather in a phone "booth" or small out-building placed far enough from the house to make its use inconvenient. More than one family may share these private phones. This allows the Amish to control their communication, not have telephone calls invade their homes, and conduct business as needed. In the past, the use of public pay phones in town for such calls was more common; today, with dwindling availability of pay phones because of increased cell phone use by the non-Amish population, Amish communities are seeing an increase in the private phone shanties. Many Amish, particularly those who run businesses, use voicemail service. The Amish will also use trusted "English" neighbors as contact points for passing on family emergency messages. Some New Order Amish will use cellphones and pagers, but most Old Order Amish will not.

=== Use of technology by different Amish affiliations ===
Many technology restrictions are more or less universal among the Old Order Amish, such as the ban on cars, radio, television, and, in most cases, the use of the internet (see above). Concerning farm and home technology, there are quite some differences between different Amish affiliations, as the table below indicates.

The three affiliations, "Lancaster," "Holmes Old Order," and "Elkhart-LaGrange," are not only the three largest affiliations but also represent the mainstream among the Old Order Amish. The most conservative affiliations are above, and the most modern ones are below. Technologies used by very few are on the left, and the ones used by most are on the right. The percentage of all Amish who use a technology is also indicated approximately.

Affiliation	Tractor for fieldwork	Rototiller	Power lawn mower	Propane gas	Bulk milk tank	Mechanical milker	Mechanical refrigerator	Pickup balers	Inside flush toilet	Running water bathtub	Tractor for belt power	Pneumatic tools	Chain saw	Pressurized lamps	Motorized washing machines
Percentage of use by all Amish	6	20	25	30	35	35	40	50	70	70	70	70	75	90	97
Swartzentruber	No	No	No	No	No	No	No	No	No	No	No	Some	No	No	Yes
Nebraska	No	No	No	No	No	No	No	Some	No	No	No	No	Some	No	Yes
Swiss (Adams)	No	No	Some	No	No	No	No	No	Some	No	No	Some	Some	Some	Some
Buchanan/Medford	No	No	No	No	No	No	No	No	No	No	No	Some	No	Yes	Yes
Milverton, Ontario	No	No	No	No	No	Yes	No	No	No	No	No	Yes	Yes	Yes	Yes
Dover, Delaware	No	No	No	No	No	No	No	No	Yes	Yes	Yes	Yes	Yes	Yes	Yes
Andy Weaver/Dan	No	No	No	No*	No	No	No	No	Yes	Yes	Yes	Yes	Yes	Yes	Yes
Geauga County	No	Yes	Some	Some	Yes	Yes	Some	Yes	Yes	Yes	Yes	Yes	Yes	Yes	Yes
Aylmer	No	No	Yes	No	Yes	No	No	No	Yes	Yes	Yes	Yes	Yes	Yes	Yes
Renno	No	No	No	No	Some	No	Some	Yes	Yes	Yes	Yes	Yes	Yes	Yes	Yes
Holmes Old Order	No	Some	Some	No*	No	No	Some	Yes	Yes	Yes	Yes	Yes	Yes	Yes	Yes
Elkhart-LaGrange	No	Some	Some	Some	Some	Some	Some	Some	Yes	Yes	Yes	Yes	Yes	Yes	Yes
Lancaster	No	No	Some	Yes	No	Yes	Yes	Yes	Yes	Yes	Yes	Yes	Yes	Yes	Yes
Nappanee, Indiana	No	Yes	Yes	Yes	Yes	Yes	Yes	Yes	Yes	Yes	Yes	Yes	Yes	Yes	Yes
Arthur, Illinois	No	Yes	Yes	Yes	Yes	Yes	Yes	Yes	Yes	Yes	Yes	Yes	Yes	Yes	Yes
New Order Non-electric	No	Yes	Yes	Yes	Yes	Yes	Yes	Yes	Yes	Yes	Yes	Yes	Yes	Yes	Yes
Somerset	Yes	Yes	Yes	Yes	Yes	Yes	Yes	Yes	Yes	Yes	Yes	Yes	Yes	Yes	Yes
Kalona, Iowa	Yes	Yes	Yes	Yes	Yes	Yes	Yes	Yes	Yes	Yes	Yes	Yes	Yes	Yes	Yes

* Natural gas allowed

== Relations with non-Amish ==
As time has passed, the Amish have felt pressures from the non-Amish. Child labor laws, for example, threaten their way of life, and raise questions regarding the treatment of children in an Amish household, and also in the way the Amish view emotional and medical support. There is a negative perception regarding how the Amish choose to view some medical conditions as being 'the will of God', without always receiving modern medical treatment found in hospitals or medical clinics. Amish children often follow in the tradition of being taught at an early age to work jobs in the home on the family's land or that of the community.

Contrary to popular belief, some of the Amish vote, and they have been courted by national parties as potential swing voters: while their pacifism and social conscience cause some of them to be drawn to left-of-center politics, their generally conservative outlook causes most to favor the right wing.

They are nonresistant, and rarely defend themselves physically or even in court; in wartime, the Amish take conscientious objector status. Their own folk history contains tales of heroic nonresistance, such as the insistence of Jacob Hochstetler (1704–1775) that his sons stop shooting at hostile Indians, who proceeded to kill some of the family and take others captive. During World War II, the Amish entered Civilian Public Service.

Amish rely on their church and community for support, and reject the concept of insurance. An example of such support is barn raising, in which the entire community gathers together to build a barn in a single day.

However, Amish will contract non-Amish, who they uniformly refer to as "English" regardless of nationality or origin, if needed to provide services they cannot perform themselves for religious reasons, such as installing a telephone line or driving a bus.

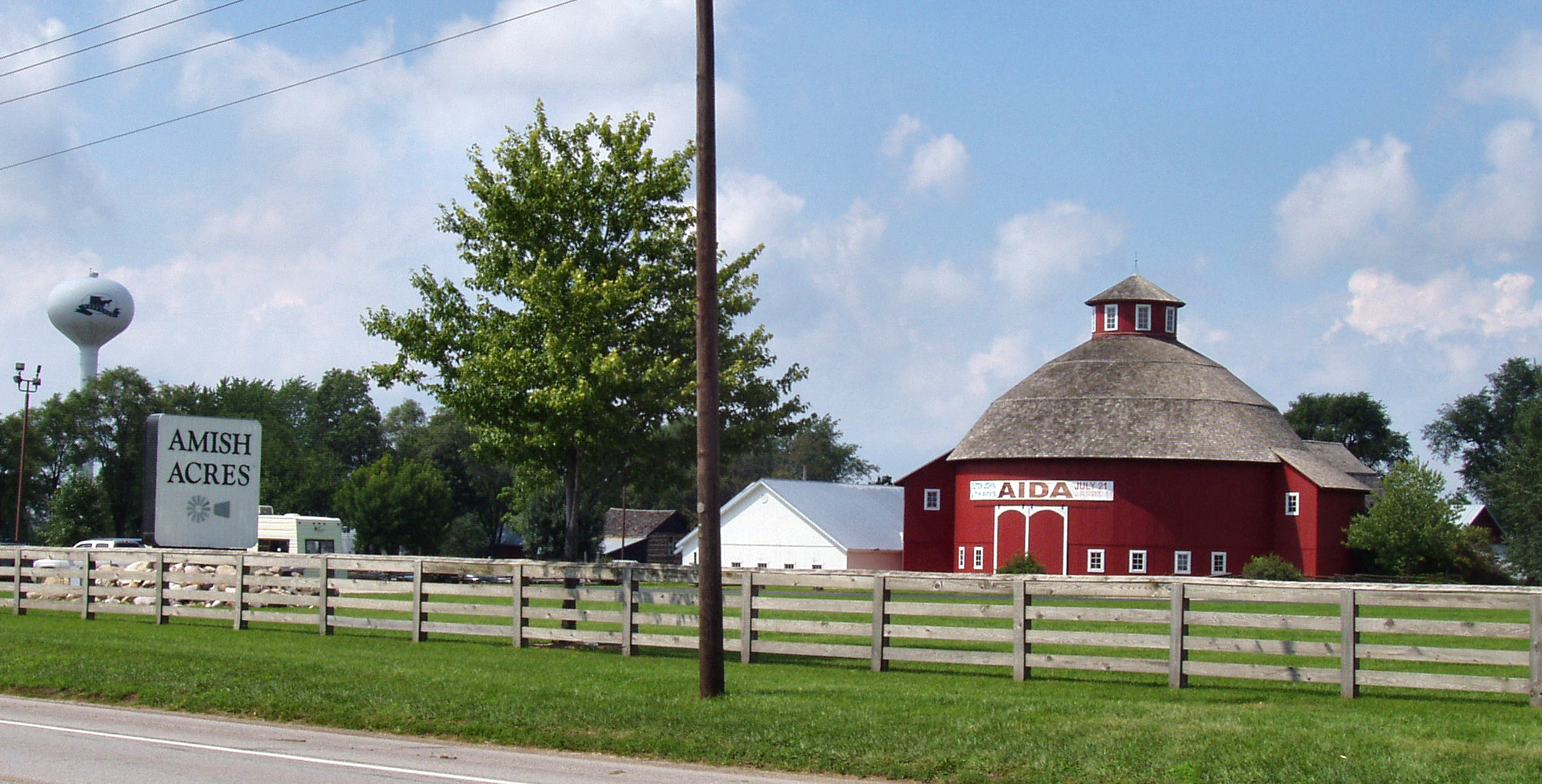
Amish Acres, an Amish crafts and tourist attraction in Nappanee, Indiana

In 1961, the United States Internal Revenue Service announced that since the Amish refuse Social Security benefits and have a religious objection to insurance, they do not need to pay these taxes. In 1965, this policy was codified into law. Self-employed individuals in certain sects do not pay into, nor receive benefits from, United States Social Security, nor do their similarly exempt employees. Internal Revenue Service form 4029 grants this exemption to members of a religious group that is conscientiously opposed to accepting benefits of any private or public insurance, provides a reasonable level of living for its dependent members and has existed continuously since December 31, 1950. Amish employees of non-Amish employers are taxed, but they do not apply for benefits. Aside from Social Security and workers' compensation, American Amish pay all required taxes.

At least one group of Amish farmers in Lancaster County, Pennsylvania, has formed a cooperative engaged in Community Supported Agriculture (CSA) agreements with non-Amish families. Working through the Lancaster Farm Fresh Cooperative this group of Amish farmers provide organic vegetables to CSA groups in Pennsylvania and surrounding states, including New York.

=== Crimes and discrimination against Amish ===
The Amish have, on occasion, encountered discrimination and hostility. During the two 20th-century World Wars, Amish nonresistance sparked many incidents of harassment, and young Amish men forcibly inducted into the services were subjected to various forms of ill treatment. In the present day, anti-Amish sentiment has taken the form of pelting the horse-drawn carriages used by the Amish with stones or similar objects as the carriages pass along a road, most commonly at night. A 1988, made-for-TV film, A Stoning in Fulham County, is based on a true story involving one such incident, in which a six-month-old Amish girl was struck in the head by a rock and died from her injuries. In 1997, Mary Kuepfer, a young Amish woman in Milverton, Ontario, Canada, was struck in the face by a beer bottle believed to have been thrown from a passing car. She required thousands of dollars' worth of surgery to her face; this was paid for by an outpouring of donations from the public.

Non-resistance has led violent perpetrators to take advantage of Amish as in the case of the West Nickel Mines School shooting. Kidnapping by non-Amish is also a common crime against Amish youth.

== See also ==
- List of U.S. states by Amish population
- Bank of Bird-in-Hand
