= New Order Amish Fellowship =

American Christian denomination (1986-)

The New Order Amish Fellowship or New New Order Amish, most commonly called New Order Christian Fellowship, is the most progressive affiliation among the New Order Amish. Because some scholars see the New Order Amish just as a subgroup of the Old Order Amish, the New Order Christian Fellowship is thus the most progressive affiliation among the Old Order Amish. In spirituality, they are close to Beachy Amish. Their use of horse and buggy transportation and their preservation of the German language distinguishes them from the Beachys, except for the Old Beachy Amish who have also retained the German language but drive cars.

== History ==
In the late 1970s, there was a dispute among the New Order Amish if undesirable behavior should be treated by sanctions or by preaching. The context of this controversy was that about half of the young people did not join the New Order Amish church. Therefore, some leaders had the impression that they had "gone too far" and that they had to "back up" a little, which was seen by the more liberal faction as a return to the "Old Order mentality". The more liberal faction, led by Aden Yoder, thus split from the New Order Amish in 1986 in Holmes County, Ohio, and formed the New Order Amish Fellowship.

== Belief and practice ==
Like Old Order groups, New Order Amish Fellowship wear plain clothing, speak Pennsylvania German and use horse and buggy, but allow tractors for field work. They still speak Pennsylvania German, but there is a tendency to shift to the English language.

All New Order Amish districts still preserve the traditional Amish dress, although there is a trend towards slimmer brimmed hats and trimmed beards among the men. As for the women, they typically have brighter colors all around. The New Order Amish Fellowship allows electricity from the grid in the home and computers in shops but discourages television. New Order Amish may be more lenient in the practice of shunning, and may be more permissive of photography than lower-order groups.

== Population ==
In 2008 the New Order Fellowship had seven congregations in three states, Ohio, Maryland and Kentucky, with a total population of about 400. In 2001 they had four church districts in four settlements in three states, mostly in Ohio. The rate of young people who join the Amish, the so-called retention rate, among the New Order Amish Fellowship is the lowest of all Amish groups. Only 31,5 to 32 percent of the young people join the church of their parents while the defection rate is 68 to 68,5 percent. Because the average number of children among the New Orders Amish is only about five, the New Order Amish Fellowship is shrinking.

== Literature ==
- Charles Hurst and David L. McConnell: An Amish Paradox: Diversity and Change in the World's Largest Amish Community, Baltimore 2010.
- G. C. Waldrep: The New Order Amish and Para-Amish Groups: Spiritual Renewal within Tradition, in The Mennonite Quarterly Review 3 (2008), pages 396-426.
- Donald B. Kraybill: The Riddle of Amish Culture, Baltimore 1989.
