= Moses M. Beachy =

American Amish bishop (1874–1946)

Moses M. Beachy (December 3, 1874 – July 7, 1946) was the founding bishop of the Beachy Amish Mennonite churches in 1927 and a former bishop in the Old Order Amish churches.

== Early life and family background ==
Beachy was born near Salisbury, Somerset County, Pennsylvania. He was ordained a minister in the Amish church on May 19, 1912, and ordained a bishop in that church on October 1, 1916.
His father, two brothers, and two sons were also Amish ministers. In 1927, he was involved in the church division that led to formation of the Beachy Amish congregations.

== Amish Mennonite division ==
The Amish Mennonite division had its roots in differences among church leaders over a strict interpretation of the streng meidung, or strong ban, shunning, or avoidance of members under church discipline, which had come to effectively excommunicate church members who left the stricter Pennsylvania district of the church in order to transfer to the less strict Maryland district. Beachy favored a more moderate position. Since he was not united on this issue with other ministers and the retired bishop of his own congregation, he considered resigning his office, but was urged by at least one minister not to do so.

Unlike many Amish congregations which meet in homes, Amish church meetings in Somerset County were conducted in church buildings, customarily meeting at two alternating locations on different Sundays, but on June 26, 1927, after a decade or more of tension over the streng meidung issue, the more conservative group and the formerly retired bishop met at the Summit Mills meetinghouse, even though Beachy had previously announced that services were to be held that Sunday at the Flag Run meetinghouse. Effectively, there were now two congregations where previously there had been one, though they continued to share the same two church buildings on alternate Sundays.

== Amish Mennonite fellowship ==
The new congregation under Moses Beachy gradually became known by the name of its bishop, a nomenclature that was not uncommon, especially when church groups met at different locations and could not assume the name of a particular place.

Other Amish congregations that identified with the issues leading to the formation of the Beachy congregation started to ally themselves into a new church fellowship group, and this larger grouping also came to be called Beachy Amish, though in some areas they were known as Amish Mennonite or as Fellowship churches. Moses Beachy and John A. Stoltzfus, bishop of a group that had divided from the Old Order Amish of Lancaster County, Pennsylvania, began a practice of visiting one another's churches in 1929, and their two congregations became leaders in the growing Beachy Amish Mennonite fellowship of churches.

== Amicable relations in spite of differences ==
Despite the failure of those involved in the 1927 church division to resolve their differences, there was mutual agreement by them on shared use of the two church meetinghouses, and for many years the two groups continued to meet at alternating locations, helping to equalize the travel distance by members who lived over a widely dispersed area. In 1928, the new Beachy congregation approved the use of automobiles, and in another year electricity and telephones, something that immediately distinguished them from the Old Order Amish, for whom travel is typically conducted by horse and carriage, and have been more selective in their adaptation to modern technology. Even though one church group now drove automobiles, the shared, amicable ownership and use of two church buildings continued until 1953, seven years after the death of Moses Beachy, when the Beachy Amish group constructed a more modern building and called themselves Mountain View Fellowship.

== Later life ==
Moses Beachy married Lucy S. Miller on February 17, 1895 and they had 14 children. Lucy died 1927 November 25. Moses married Mary E. Hershberger on November 12, 1928. He died on July 7, 1946, at the age of 71.

== See also ==
- Old Order Mennonite
- Shunning
- Weavertown Amish Mennonite Church
