= List of U.S. states by Amish population =

Amish population in the US:
Year	Pop.	±% p.a.
1920	5,000	—
1928	7,000	+4.30%
1936	9,000	+3.19%
1944	13,000	+4.70%
1952	19,000	+4.86%
1960	28,000	+4.97%
1968	39,000	+4.23%
1976	57,000	+4.86%
1984	84,000	+4.97%
1992	125,850	+5.18%
2000	174,810	+4.19%
2010	244,770	+3.42%
2020	344,670	+3.48%
2021	355,660	+3.19%
2022	367,295	+3.27%
2023	378,190	+2.97%
2024	394,720	+4.37%
2025	404,575	+2.50%
2026	414,545	+2.46%
Sources: 1992, 2000, 2010, 2020, 2021, 2022, 2023 2024, and 2026.

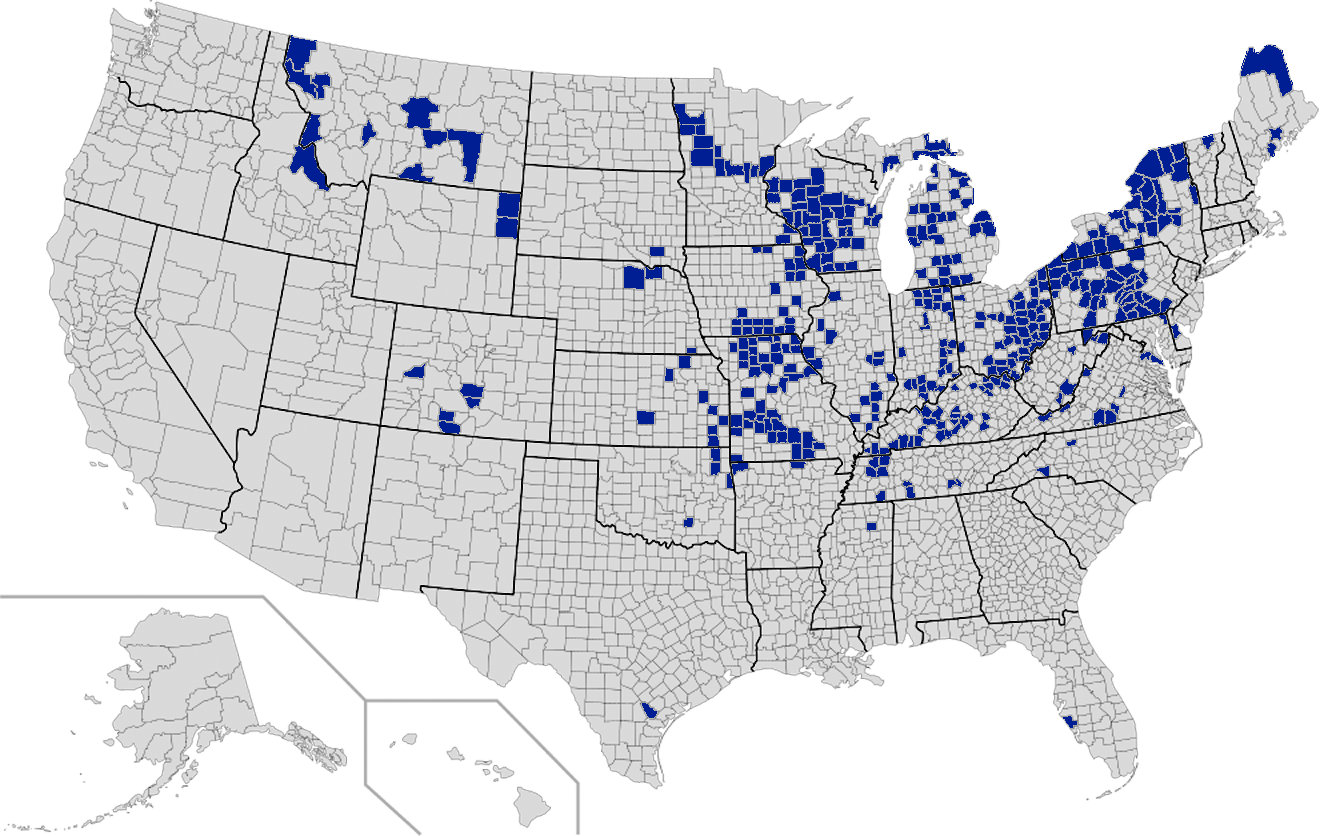
Counties with Amish settlements in 2021

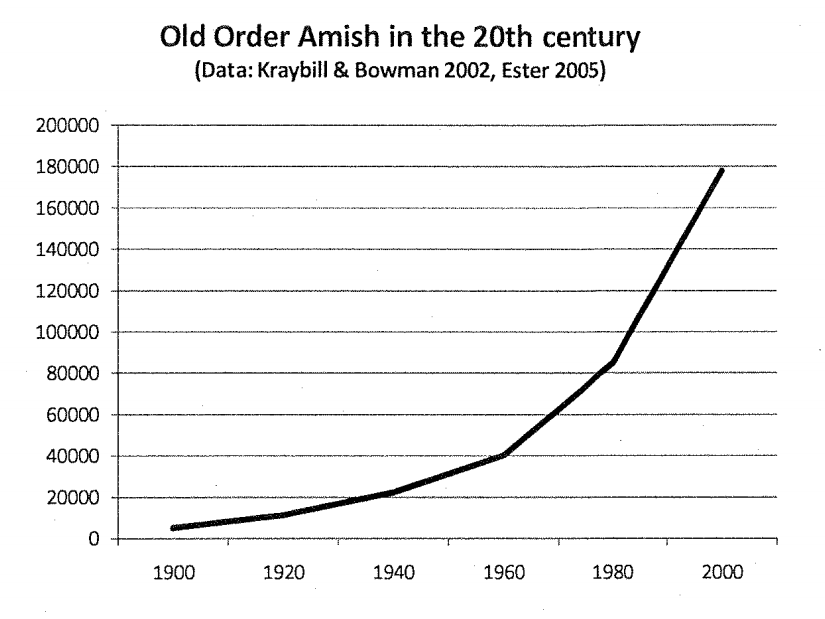
Old Order Amish population growth in the 20th century

There were 33 states of the United States with an Amish population in 2026 that consists of at least one Amish settlement of Old or New Order Amish, excluding more modern Amish groups (e.g. Beachy Amish). New Order Amish are seen as part of the Old Order Amish by most scholars despite the name.

Over 60% of the Amish live in Pennsylvania, Ohio and Indiana, though that percentage is slightly decreasing each year. The largest Amish settlement is in Lancaster County, Pennsylvania and adjacent counties followed by Holmes and adjoining counties in northeast Ohio, about 78 miles south of Cleveland. Third in size is the settlement in Elkhart, LaGrange and surrounding counties in northeastern Indiana which is geographically merging with the Nappanee settlement due to the growth of both settlements, which filled the gap between the two. According to Albrecht Powell, the Pennsylvania Amish has not always been the largest group of U.S. Amish as is commonly thought.

The Amish population in the U.S. numbers more than 400,000 and is growing rapidly (around 3-4% per year), "due to large family size (seven children on average) and a church-member retention rate of approximately 80%."

== Statistics of states ==
Amish population by state and year
State	1992	2000	2010	2020	2026	Change 2020–2026	% of the state population	% of the total U.S. Amish population
Pennsylvania	32,710	44,620	59,350	81,500	96,535	▲18.4%	0.74%	23.3%
Ohio	34,830	48,545	58,590	78,280	87,760	▲12.1%	0.74%	21.2%
Indiana	23,405	32,840	43,710	59,305	68,025	▲14.7%	0.97%	16.4%
Wisconsin	6,785	9,390	15,360	22,235	28,940	▲30.2%	0.48%	7.0%
New York	4,050	4,505	12,015	21,230	26,320	▲24.0%	0.13%	6.3%
Michigan	5,150	8,495	11,350	16,525	21,110	▲27.7%	0.21%	5.1%
Missouri	3,745	5,480	9,475	14,520	19,360	▲33.3%	0.31%	4.7%
Kentucky	2,625	4,850	7,750	13,595	17,222	▲26.7%	0.37%	4.1%
Iowa	3,525	4,445	7,190	9,780	11,140	▲13.9%	0.34%	2.7%
Illinois	2,940	3,785	6,860	7,240	9,395	▲29.7%	0.07%	2.2%
Ontario	2,295	3,100	4,725	5,605	6,135	▲9.4%	–	–
Minnesota	1,135	1,420	3,150	4,740	5,560	▲17.3%	0.10%	1.3%
Tennessee	750	1,270	2,125	3,325	4,610	▲38.6%	0.06%	1.1%
Kansas	675	990	1,485	2,025	3,085	▲52.3%	0.10%	>
Virginia	75	335	300	1,590	2,605	▲63.8%	>	>
Delaware	1,200	1,080	1,350	1,750	2,155	▲23.1%	0.20%	>
Maryland	810	1,020	1,350	1,650	2,020	▲22.4%	>	>
Montana	270	335	675	935	1,630	▲74.3%	0.14%	>
Maine	−	25	225	955	1,330	▲39.3%	0.09%	>
West Virginia	−	70	225	390	1,185	▲203.8%	0.07%	>
Colorado	−	−	810	650	1,000	▲53.8%	>	>
Oklahoma	540	620	675	675	790	▲17.0%	>	>
Nebraska	−	−	150	355	713	▲100.8%	>	>
Wyoming	−	−	−	220	600	▲172.7%	0.10%	>
Prince Edward I.	−	−	−	250	330	▲32.0%	–	–
North Carolina	75	240	75	270	265	▼1.8%	>	>
Arkansas	−	35	225	265	250	▼5.6%	>	>
Vermont	−	−	−	95	230	▲142.1%	>	>
South Dakota	−	−	75	60	215	▲258.3%	>	>
New Brunswick	−	−	−	70	190	▲171.4%	–	–
Mississippi	−	90	75	290	155	▼46.5%	>	>
Idaho	−	120	−	55	125	▲127.3%	>	>
Florida*	75	100	75	100	100	Steady	>	>
Texas	405	45	75	65	60	▼7.7%	>	>
New Mexico	−	−	−	−	35	▲	>	>
Alabama	−	−	−	−	20	▲	>	>
Total US pop.	125,850	174,810	244,770	344,670	414,545	▲20.3%	0.12%	100%

- italic designates the 3 Canadian provinces that have Amish communities. Their population is not summed with the total population in the US, and is for statistical purpose.
- The settlement in Pinecraft (Sarasota), Florida is very atypical and its population varies a lot according to the season.

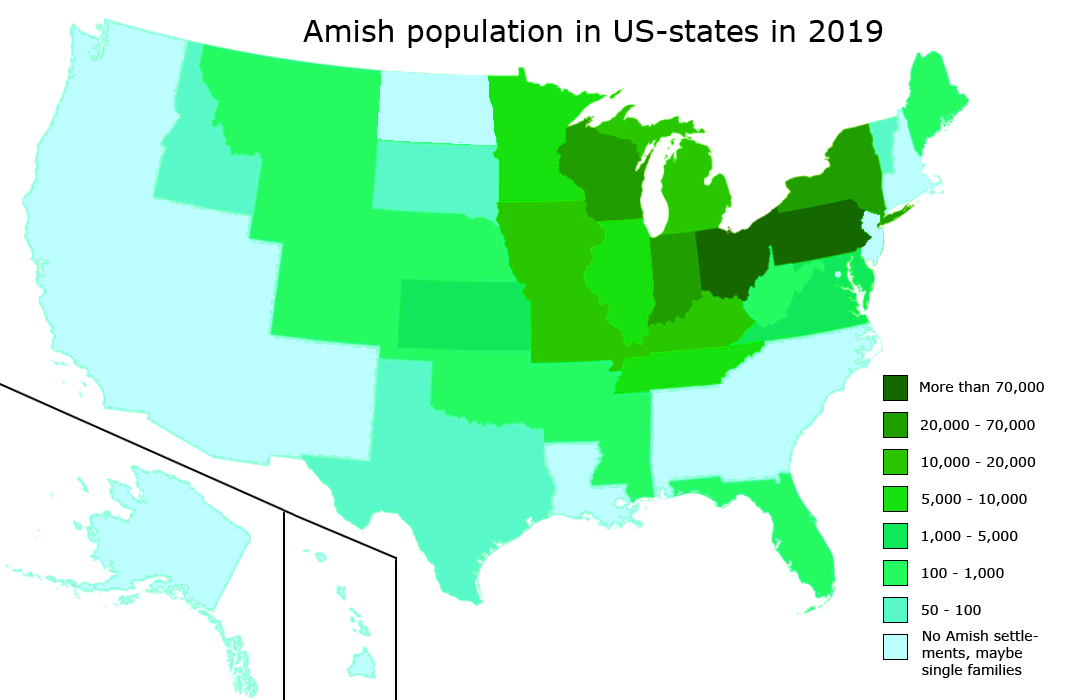
States ranked according to Amish population in 2019

Sources of the statistics

The data for 1992 are from "Amish Studies - The Young Center".

The data for 2000 are from a book published in 2001 (Donald Kraybill, The Riddle of Amish Culture) and from "Amish Studies – The Young Center".

The data for 2010 are from "Amish Studies - The Young Center". The 2010 census of Amish population was published in 2012, compiled by Elizabeth Cooksey, professor of sociology, and Cory Anderson, a graduate student in rural sociology, both at the Ohio State University. It was commissioned by the Association of Statisticians of American Religious Bodies for the 2010 U.S. Religion Census (published in 2012).

The data from 2025 comes from "Elizabethtown College, the Young Center for Anabaptist and Pietist Studies-2026" as of June 2026.

== Counties with the highest percentage ==
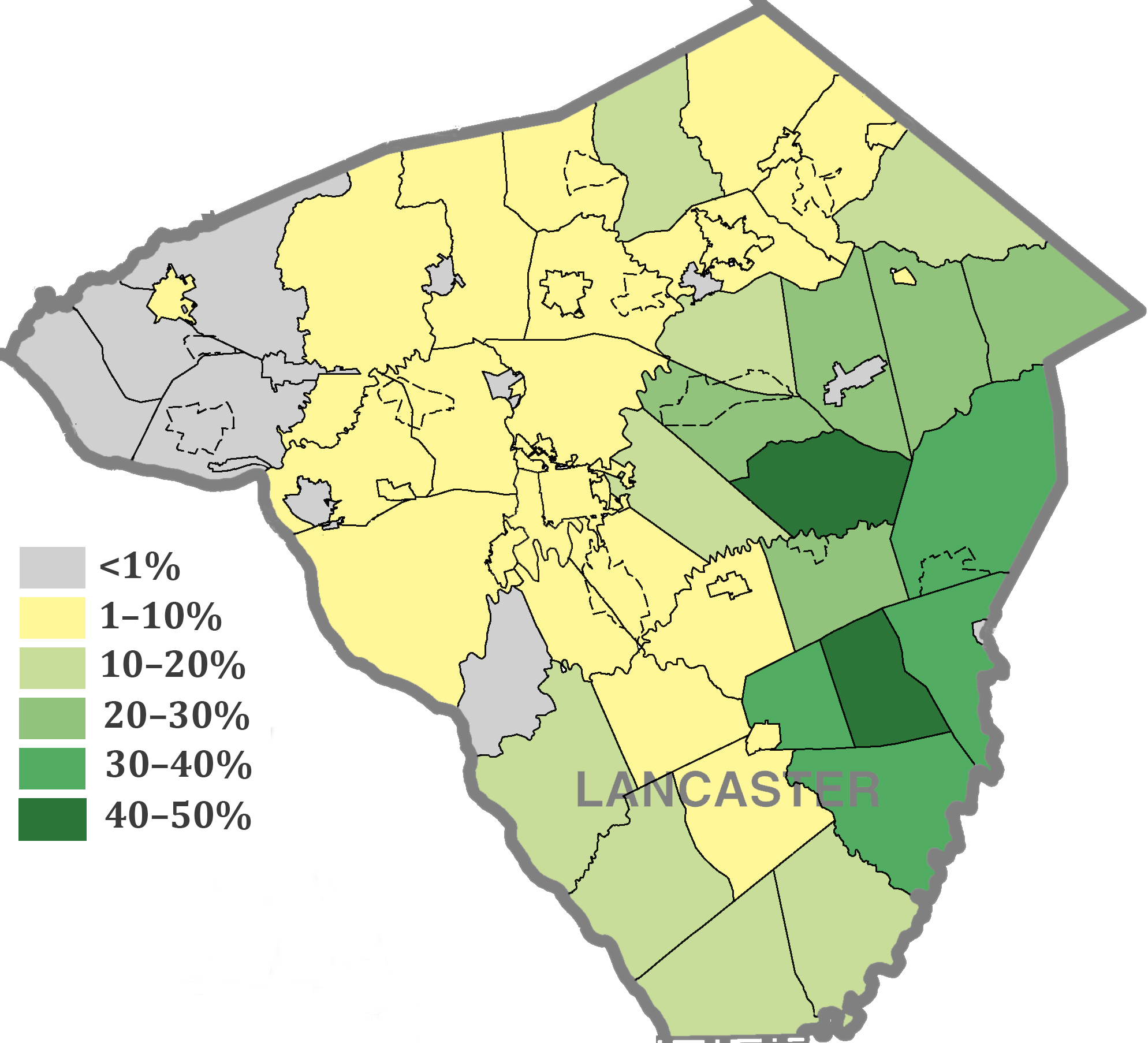
Lancaster County, Pennsylvania: Persons speaking an Indo-European language at home other than English or Spanish (among adults 18+), a vast majority of them speak Pennsylvania German. Data are being provided by: ACS 2019 5-year estimate.

Data from 2010 according to "Association of Religion Data Archives" (ARDA)

And from 2020 according to the "US Religion Census" report. Data are only shown for Old Order Amish and exclude related groups such as Beachy Amish-Mennonite Churches, Maranatha Amish-Mennonite, Amish-Mennonites and Mennonites in general.

County	State	Adherents (2010)	Adherents (2020)	Change 2010-20	% 2010	% 2020
Holmes	Ohio	17,654	19,793	▲12.1%	41.67%	44.76%
LaGrange	Indiana	14,011	17,567	▲25.4%	37.74%	43.43%
Adams	Indiana	6,343	8,088	▲27.5%	18.44%	22.59%
Davis	Iowa	1,355	1,768	▲30.5%	15.48%	19.41%
Daviess	Indiana	3,708	5,106	▲37.7%	11.72%	15.30%
Wayne	Iowa	323	962	▲197.8%	5.04%	14.81%
Hart	Kentucky	1,646	2,486	▲51.0%	9.04%	12.89%
Douglas	Illinois	2,361	2,282	▼3.3%	11.81%	11.56%
Vernon	Wisconsin	2,786	3,544	▲27.2%	9.36%	11.54%
Geauga	Ohio	8,537	9,549	▲11.8%	9.14%	10.01%
Mercer	Missouri	156	322	▲106.4%	4.12%	9.10%
Parke	Indiana	1,105	1,351	▲22.3%	6.37%	8.36%
Mifflin	Pennsylvania	2,899	3,609	▲24.5%	6.21%	7.82%
Wayne	Ohio	9,283	9,130	▼1.6%	8.10%	7.81%
Daviess	Missouri	596	657	▲10.2%	7.07%	7.79%
Schuyler	Missouri	256	306	▲19.5%	5.78%	7.59%
Moultrie	Illinois	1,260	1,070	▼15.1%	8.49%	7.37%
Van Buren	Iowa	548	500	▼8.7%	7.24%	6.94%
Coshocton	Ohio	1,760	2,533	▲43.9%	4.77%	6.92%
Clark	Wisconsin	1,986	2,379	▲19.8%	5.72%	6.86%
Webster	Missouri	2,252	2,586	▲14.8%	6.22%	6.62%
Pawnee	Nebraska	103	168	▲63.1%	3.71%	6.60%
Buchanan	Iowa	1,241	1,296	▲4.4%	5.92%	6.30%
Jay	Indiana	1,024	1,272	▲24.2%	4.82%	6.21%
Bath	Kentucky	103	747	▲625.2%	0.89%	5.86%
Forest	Pennsylvania	152	397	▲161.2%	1.97%	5.69%
Crawford	Pennsylvania	3,506	4,661	▲32.9%	3.95%	5.55%
Branch	Michigan	1,784	2,488	▲39.5%	3.94%	5.55%
Green Lake	Wisconsin	812	1,047	▲28.9%	4.26%	5.51%
Decatur	Iowa	259	415	▲60.2%	3.06%	5.43%
Lafayette	Wisconsin	441	898	▲103.6%	2.62%	5.41%
Nicholas	Kentucky	103	408	▲296.1%	1.44%	5.41%
Clinton	Pennsylvania	1,315	1,989	▲51.2%	3.35%	5.31%
Monroe	Missouri	301	457	▲51.8%	3.40%	5.27%
Juniata	Pennsylvania	973	1,236	▲27.0%	3.95%	5.26%
Fleming	Kentucky	394	772	▲95.9%	2.75%	5.12%
Lancaster	Pennsylvania	26,270	28,172	▲7.2%	5.06%	5.10%
Grundy	Missouri	348	490	▲40.8%	3.39%	5.00%
Todd	Minnesota	822	1,254	▲52.5%	3.30%	4.96%
Switzerland	Indiana	469	470	▲0.2%	4.42%	4.83%
Crittenden	Kentucky	612	422	▼31.0%	6.57%	4.69%
Harrison	Missouri	243	379	▲56.0%	2.71%	4.65%
Jefferson	Pennsylvania	1,129	2,055	▲82.0%	2.50%	4.62%
Pike	Missouri	377	799	▲111.9%	2.04%	4.54%
Knox	Ohio	2,111	2,843	▲34.7%	3.46%	4.53%
Taylor	Wisconsin	502	900	▲79.3%	2.43%	4.52%
Fillmore	Minnesota	978	951	▼2.8%	4.69%	4.48%
Trigg	Kentucky	215	610	▲183.7%	1.50%	4.34%
Gladwin	Michigan	561	1,068	▲90.4%	2.18%	4.21%
Macon	Missouri	606	631	▲4.1%	3.89%	4.15%
Elk	Kansas	0	103	▲103.0%	0.00%	4.15%
Todd	Kentucky	414	496	▲19.8%	3.32%	4.05%
St. Clair	Missouri	131	373	▲184.7%	1.34%	4.02%
Charlotte	Virginia	157	458	▲191.7%	1.25%	3.97%
Ringgold	Iowa	387	183	▼52.7%	7.54%	3.92%
Jackson	Wisconsin	509	827	▲62.5%	2.49%	3.91%
Clare	Michigan	659	1,195	▲81.3%	2.13%	3.87%
Montgomery	New York	1,056	1,906	▲80.5%	2.10%	3.85%
Ashtabula	Ohio	2,203	3,725	▲69.1%	2.17%	3.82%
Elkhart	Indiana	6,244	7,886	▲26.3%	3.16%	3.81%
Audrain	Missouri	833	937	▲12.5%	3.26%	3.75%
Lewis	Missouri	376	373	▼0.8%	3.68%	3.72%
Custer	Colorado	65	172	▲164.6%	1.53%	3.66%
Ashland	Ohio	1,661	1,877	▲13.0%	3.13%	3.58%
Marshall	Indiana	1,413	1,636	▲15.8%	3.00%	3.55%
Monroe	Ohio	542	475	▼12.3%	3.70%	3.55%
Carroll	Ohio	614	937	▲52.6%	2.13%	3.51%
Cattaraugus	New York	1,437	2,666	▲85.5%	1.79%	3.46%
Hardin	Ohio	939	1,051	▲11.9%	2.93%	3.42%
Morrow	Ohio	590	1,175	▲99.2%	1.69%	3.36%
Pepin	Wisconsin	187	246	▲31.6%	2.50%	3.36%
Tuscarawas	Ohio	2,370	3,128	▲32.0%	2.56%	3.35%
Noble	Indiana	1,006	1,589	▲57.9%	2.12%	3.35%
Marquette	Wisconsin	244	522	▲113.9%	1.58%	3.35%
Montour	Pennsylvania	446	602	▲35.0%	2.44%	3.32%
Knox	Missouri	0	124	▲124.0%	0.00%	3.31%
Indiana	Pennsylvania	2,525	2,708	▲7.2%	2.84%	3.25%
Lucas	Iowa	214	276	▲29.0%	2.40%	3.20%
Seneca	New York	731	1,056	▲44.5%	2.07%	3.12%
Conejos	Colorado	119	232	▲103.5%	1.44%	3.11%
Kosciusko	Indiana	2,277	2,472	▲8.6%	2.94%	3.08%
Noble	Ohio	0	434	▲434.0%	0.00%	3.07%
Perry	Pennsylvania	528	1,375	▲160.4%	1.15%	3.00%
Gallia	Ohio	733	875	▲19.4%	2.37%	3.00%

Counties under 3% Amish, but above 250 adherents each

County	State	Adherents (2010)	Adherents (2020)	Change 2010-20	% 2010	% 2020
Trumbull	Ohio	3,864	5,044	▲30.5%	1.84%	2.50%
Allen	Indiana	3,466	4,577	▲32.0%	0.97%	1.19%
Chester	Pennsylvania	2,580	3,871	▲50.0%	0.52%	0.72%
Mercer	Pennsylvania	2,602	2,875	▲10.5%	2.23%	2.60%
Centre	Pennsylvania	1,764	2,836	▲60.8%	1.15%	1.79%
St. Lawrence	New York	1,840	2,663	▲44.7%	1.64%	2.45%
Kent	Delaware	1,424	1,761	▲23.7%	0.87%	0.97%
St. Joseph	Michigan	1,533	1,749	▲14.1%	2.50%	2.87%
Christian	Kentucky	1,019	1,602	▲57.2%	1.38%	2.20%
Dauphin	Pennsylvania	862	1,468	▲70.3%	0.32%	0.51%
Steuben	New York	1,317	1,440	▲9.3%	1.33%	1.54%
Chautauqua	New York	1,672	1,329	▼20.5%	1.24%	1.04%
Franklin	Pennsylvania	1,073	1,328	▲23.8%	0.72%	0.85%
Somerset	Pennsylvania	1,161	1,293	▲11.4%	1.49%	1.74%
Lebanon	Pennsylvania	728	1,270	▲74.4%	0.54%	0.89%
Lawrence	Tennessee	1,482	1,250	▼15.6%	3.54%	2.83%
Allegany	New York	483	1,234	▲155.5%	0.99%	2.66%
York	Pennsylvania	266	1,210	▲354.9%	0.06%	0.27%
Lawrence	Pennsylvania	1,447	1,140	▼21.2%	1.59%	1.32%
Eau Claire	Wisconsin	794	1,115	▲40.4%	0.80%	1.06%
Wayne	Indiana	625	1,045	▲67.2%	0.91%	1.57%
Grant	Wisconsin	756	1,000	▲32.1%	1.47%	1.92%
Tuscola	Michigan	137	968	▲606.5%	0.25%	1.82%
Johnson	Iowa	858	934	▲8.9%	0.65%	0.61%
Warren	Pennsylvania	608	916	▲50.6%	1.45%	2.37%
Mecosta	Michigan	719	903	▲25.6%	1.68%	2.27%
Jackson	Ohio	339	875	▲158.1%	1.02%	2.68%
Sauk	Wisconsin	631	875	▲38.7%	1.02%	1.33%
Clearfield	Pennsylvania	820	862	▲5.1%	1.00%	1.07%
Sanilac	Michigan	550	861	▲56.5%	1.28%	2.12%
Clarion	Pennsylvania	302	825	▲173.2%	0.76%	2.22%
Oneida	New York	29	823	▲2737.9%	0.01%	0.35%
Hillsdale	Michigan	681	823	▲20.8%	1.46%	1.80%
Washington	Indiana	379	811	▲114.0%	1.34%	2.88%
Northumberland	Pennsylvania	620	811	▲30.8%	0.66%	0.89%
Guernsey	Ohio	552	806	▲46.0%	1.38%	2.10%
Charles	Maryland	489	769	▲57.3%	0.33%	0.46%
Cumberland	Pennsylvania	436	749	▲71.8%	0.18%	0.29%
Logan	Ohio	640	738	▲15.3%	1.39%	1.60%
Lycoming	Pennsylvania	620	715	▲15.3%	0.53%	0.63%
Franklin	New York	181	704	▲288.9%	0.35%	1.48%
Isabella	Michigan	277	695	▲150.9%	0.39%	1.08%
Montcalm	Michigan	394	687	▲74.4%	0.62%	1.03%
Armstrong	Pennsylvania	236	678	▲187.3%	0.34%	1.03%
Barren	Kentucky	454	660	▲45.4%	1.08%	1.48%
Aroostook	Maine	138	627	▲354.3%	0.19%	0.93%
Portage	Ohio	387	619	▲59.9%	0.24%	0.38%
Washington	Iowa	563	610	▲8.3%	2.59%	2.70%
Otsego	New York	223	602	▲170.0%	0.36%	1.03%
Stark	Ohio	447	602	▲34.7%	0.12%	0.16%
Coles	Illinois	217	594	▲173.7%	0.40%	1.27%
Osceola	Michigan	593	580	▼2.2%	2.52%	2.53%
Medina	Ohio	616	571	▼7.3%	0.36%	0.31%
Highland	Ohio	269	570	▲111.9%	0.62%	1.32%
Winona	Minnesota	370	555	▲50.0%	0.72%	1.12%
St. Mary's	Maryland	610	549	▼10.0%	0.58%	0.48%
Lincoln	Kentucky	473	530	▲12.0%	1.91%	2.18%
Jackson	Illinois	360	529	▲46.9%	0.60%	1.00%
Herkimer	New York	401	527	▲31.4%	0.62%	0.88%
Orange	Indiana	593	523	▼11.8%	2.99%	2.63%
Wayne	New York	183	506	▲176.5%	0.19%	0.55%
Adams	Ohio	471	501	▲6.4%	1.65%	1.82%
Snyder	Pennsylvania	344	496	▲44.2%	0.87%	1.25%
Breckinridge	Kentucky	273	489	▲79.1%	1.36%	2.39%
Wayne	Illinois	197	479	▲143.1%	1.17%	2.96%
Shawano	Wisconsin	307	463	▲50.8%	0.73%	1.13%
Wright	Missouri	182	462	▲153.8%	0.97%	2.54%
Newaygo	Michigan	290	455	▲56.9%	0.60%	0.91%
Marathon	Wisconsin	371	454	▲22.3%	0.28%	0.33%
Jefferson	Illinois	345	453	▲31.3%	0.89%	1.22%
Eaton	Michigan	308	450	▲46.1%	0.28%	0.41%
Muskingum	Ohio	293	449	▲53.2%	0.34%	0.52%
Benton	Arkansas	0	449	▲449.0%	0.00%	0.16%
Trempealeau	Wisconsin	351	446	▲27.1%	1.22%	1.45%
Madison	New York	217	440	▲102.7%	0.29%	0.65%
Waushara	Wisconsin	336	438	▲30.4%	1.37%	1.79%
Columbiana	Ohio	0	435	▲435.0%	0.00%	0.43%
Columbia	Wisconsin	450	432	▼4.0%	0.79%	0.74%
Harrison	Ohio	305	429	▲40.7%	1.92%	2.96%
Calhoun	Michigan	298	429	▲44.0%	0.22%	0.32%
Richland	Wisconsin	275	425	▲54.5%	1.52%	2.46%
Lawrence	Missouri	430	417	▼3.0%	1.11%	1.10%
Crawford	Illinois	248	413	▲66.5%	1.25%	2.21%
Clayton	Iowa	467	411	▼12.0%	2.57%	2.41%
Halifax	Virginia	205	408	▲99.0%	0.56%	1.20%
Labette	Kansas	173	407	▲135.3%	0.80%	2.02%
Neosho	Kansas	51	405	▲694.1%	0.31%	2.55%
Oswego	New York	107	404	▲277.6%	0.09%	0.34%
Reno	Kansas	435	403	▲7.3%	0.67%	0.65%
Mayes	Oklahoma	272	392	▲44.1%	0.66%	1.00%
Venango	Pennsylvania	332	392	▲18.1%	0.60%	0.78%
Barron	Wisconsin	115	381	▲231.3%	0.25%	0.82%
Livingston	New York	24	374	▲1458.3%	0.04%	0.60%
Richland	Ohio	313	343	▲9.6%	0.25%	0.27%
Polk	Missouri	186	342	▲83.9%	0.60%	1.09%
Cortland	New York	63	337	▲434.9%	0.13%	0.72%
Barton	Missouri	162	334	▲106.2%	1.31%	2.87%
Jefferson	New York	176	333	▲89.2%	0.15%	0.29%
St. Croix	Wisconsin	0	331	▲331.0%	0.00%	0.35%
Blair	Pennsylvania	205	328	▲60.0%	0.16%	0.27%
Wood	Wisconsin	143	326	▲128.0%	0.19%	0.44%
Garrett	Maryland	261	322	▲23.4%	0.87%	1.12%
Logan	Kentucky	502	320	▼36.2%	1.87%	1.17%
Barry	Michigan	76	318	▲318.4%	0.13%	0.51%
Adair	Missouri	170	317	▲86.5%	0.66%	1.25%
Texas	Missouri	126	302	▲139.7%	0.48%	1.23%
Graves	Kentucky	181	298	▲64.6%	0.49%	0.81%
Waupaca	Wisconsin	192	295	▲53.6%	0.37%	0.57%
Henry	Kentucky	81	287	▲254.3%	0.52%	1.83%
Cambria	Pennsylvania	115	285	▲147.3%	0.08%	0.21%
Henry	Missouri	75	284	▲278.7%	0.33%	1.29%
Mason	Kentucky	203	270	▲33.0%	1.16%	1.58%
Columbia	Pennsylvania	121	265	▲119.0%	0.18	0.41%
Becker	Minnesota	114	264	▲131.6%	0.35%	0.75%
Delaware	Iowa	4	264	▲6500%	<0.01%	1.5%
Lewis	New York	188	262	▲39.4%	0.69%	1.00%
Crawford	Wisconsin	51	262	▲413.7%	0.31%	1.63%
Otter Tail	Minnesota	170	260	▲52.9%	0.30%	0.43%
Johnson	Missouri	131	252	▲92.4%	0.25%	0.47%
Oceana	Michigan	53	251	▲373.6%	0.20%	0.94%

== Largest designated settlements ==
Settlement in	State	Estimated population (2020)	Estimated population (2021)	Estimated population (2022)	Estimated population (2023)	Estimated population (2024)	Change 2023–2024
Lancaster, Chester, York and Berks counties area	PA	40,525	41,795	43,010	43,400	43,640	▲0.5%
Holmes, Wayne, Coshocton, Tuscarawas and Stark counties	OH	36,955	37,770	38,635	39,525	40,435	▲2.3%
LaGrange, Elkhart and Noble counties area	IN	26,380	27,105	27,815	28,275	29,180	▲3.2%
Geauga, Trumbull, Ashtabula and Portage counties area	OH	18,820	19,420	19,900	20,440	20,980	▲2.6%
Adams / Jay counties area	IN	10,305	10,630	11,080	10,680	10,855	▲1.6%
Nappanee, Elkhart, St. Joseph, Marshall and Kosciusko counties area	IN	6,300	6,445	6,570	6,695	6,835	▲2.1%
Daviess / Martin counties area	IN	5,465	5,595	5,760	5,965	6,145	▲3.0%
Arthur, Moultrie, Douglas and Coles counties area	IL	4,095	4,270	4,360	4,490	5,605	▲24.8%
Belleville, Mifflin county	PA	4,090	4,205	4,240	4,270	5,420	▲26.9%
Seymour, Webster county	MO	3,170	3,110	3,230	3,530	4,025	▲14.0%
Allen, Allen county	IN	3,445	3,550	3,645	3,750	3,850	▲2.7%
Smicksburg, Indiana county	PA	3,355	2,945	3,070	3,190	3,315	▲3.9%
Heuvelton, St. Lawrence county	NY	2,540	2,640	2,770	2,905	3,050	▲5.0%
Lawrence / Mercer counties area	PA	2,740	2,820	2,890	2,970	3,045	▲2.5%
Conewango Valley, Cattaraugus county	NY	2,450	2,515	2,590	2,700	2,835	▲5.0%
Clearfield / Jefferson counties area	PA	1,850	2,560	2,620	2,680	2,730	▲1.9%
Spartansburg, Crawford county	PA	2,335	2,425	2,525	2,615	2,695	▲3.1%
Monroe / Vernon counties area	WI	2,420	2,360	2,475	2,495	2,580	▲3.4%
Medina / Ashland counties area	OH	2,165	2,245	2,360	2,460	2,550	▲3.7%
Munfordville, Hart county	KY	2,340	2,360	2,430	2,390	2,455	▲2.7%
Columbia, Marquette and Green Lake counties area	WI	1,980	2,050	2,155	2,240	2,395	▲6.9%
Christian / Trigg counties area	KY	2,025	2,125	2,235	2,325	2,335	▲0.4%
Ethridge, Lawrence county	TN	2,080	2,190	2,300	2,205	2,275	▲3.2%
Centreville, St. Joseph county	MI	1,815	1,870	1,920	1,980	2,150	▲8.6%
Dover, Kent county	DE	1,750	1,795	1,865	1,915	1,990	▲3.9%
Rockville, Parke county	IN	1,505	1,535	1,715	1,810	1,920	▲6.1%
Bloomfield, Davis county	IA	1,640	1,800	1,865	1,790	1,860	▲3.9%
Millersburg, Dauphin county	PA	1,645	1,700	1,740	1,790	1,840	▲2.8%
Clinton / Centre counties area	PA	1,395	1,450	1,600	1,650	1,700	▲3.0%
Branch / Hillsdale County counties area	MI	1,335	1,440	1,520	1,600	1,675	▲4.7%
Hagerstown, Wayne county	IN	1,425	1,480	1,550	1,600	1,670	▲4.3%
Audrain / Monroe counties area	MO	1,530	1,540	1,610	1,645	1,655	▲0.6%
Clymer, Chautauqua county	NY	1,475	1,520	1,565	1,610	1,600	▼0.6%
Kalona, Washington county	IA	1,935	1,535	1,665	1,380	1,595	▲15.6%
St. Mary's / Charles counties area	MD	1,380	1,450	1,515	1,575	1,570	▼0.3%
Garrett, Somerset county	PA	1,440	1,345	1,485	1,525	1,565	▲2.6%
Hazleton, Buchanan county	IA	1,490	1,550	1,595	1,495	1,550	▲3.7%
Augusta, Eau Claire county	WI	1,415	1,495	1,570	1,630	1,545	▼5.2%
Darlington, Lafayette county	WI	1,195	1,265	1,320	1,375	1,475	▲7.3%
Myerstown, Lebanon county	PA	1,325	1,355	1,395	1,440	1,475	▲2.4%
Sugar Grove, Warren county	PA	1,300	1,175	1,285	1,350	1,415	▲4.8%
Loganton, Clinton county	PA	1,135	1,170	1,275	1,310	1,375	▲5.0%
Wilton, Monroe county	WI	1,230	1,290	1,355	1,310	1,360	▲3.8%
Richland / Vernon counties area	WI	1,105	1,175	1,240	1,280	1,335	▲4.3%
Port Royal, Juniata county	PA	1,235	1,240	1,315	1,335	1,320	▼1.1%
Atlantic, Crawford county	PA	1,370	1,415	1,455	1,275	1,310	▲2.7%
Rebersburg, Centre county	PA	1,070	1,125	1,220	1,255	1,305	▲4.0%
Clare, Clare county	MI	985	1,020	1,040	1,080	1,285	▲19.0%
Hardin / Marion counties area	OH	1,320	1,355	1,155	1,195	1,250	▲4.6%
Morrow / Knox counties area	OH	1,920	2,005	1,125	1,230	1,245	▲1.2%
Granton, Clark county	WI	1,120	1,170	1,205	1,270	1,240	▼2.3%
Loysville, Perry county	PA	1,040	1,075	1,110	1,155	1,200	▲3.9%
Cumberland / Franklin counties area	PA	1,050	1,065	1,110	1,145	1,185	▲3.5%
Romulus, Seneca county	NY	1,065	1,090	1,115	1,140	1,170	▲2.6%
Seymour, Wayne county	IA	865	900	955	1,120	1,165	▲4.0%
Brinkhaven, Knox county	MI	-	820	880	920	1,060	▲15.2%
Daviess, Grundy and Livingston counties area	MO	990	1,015	1,045	1,090	1,060	▼2.7%
Stanwood, Mecosta county	MI	955	985	995	1,035	1,050	▲1.4%
Gallipolis, Gallia county	OH	670	695	1,005	1,030	1,050	▲1.9%
Mohawk Valley, Montgomery county	NY	765	815	925	960	1,020	▲6.2%
Loyal, Clark county	WI	860	890	935	970	1,015	▲4.6%
Allenwood, Lycoming county	PA	835	875	915	950	995	▲4.7%
Ashland, Ashland county	OH	940	970	980	980	980	Steady
Woodhull, Steuben county	NY	845	845	855	895	940	▲5.0%
Huron, Sanilac and Tuscola counties area	MI	855	855	880	905	935	▲3.3%
DeGraff, Logan county	OH	805	805	840	875	920	▲5.1%
Knox / Licking counties area	OH	860	860	885	880	895	▲1.7%

Sources: 2020, 2021, 2022, 2023 and 2024.

== Amish settlements outside the US ==
There are Amish settlements in four Canadian provinces, Ontario, founded in the 1820s, Manitoba, founded in 2018, New Brunswick in 2015 and Prince Edward Island, in 2016.

There was an Amish settlement in Honduras from about 1968 to 1978 but the settlement failed.

In 2015, new settlements of New Order Amish were founded in Argentina and Bolivia.
