= Henry Lapp =

Henry L. Lapp (August 18, 1862 in Leacock, Lancaster County, Pennsylvania – July 5, 1904 in Gordonville) was one of the best known carpenters-cabinetmakers of nineteenth century America. The third of seven children, Lapp was born deaf, and it is believed that from an early age he painted pictures in order to communicate because he could not speak plainly. "His art became his speech," according to Merle Good, a collector quoted by The New York Times in 1980. Lapp's designs and colorful drawings have been saved for posterity in his "handbook", which he must have carried with him to show samples of his cabinets to prospective clients. Experts point to Lapp's designs as the closest representation of what it is regarded as 19th-century Amish furniture style.

Since 1958, after receiving a gift from Titus Geesey, much of the work of Henry Lapp is being collected by the Philadelphia Museum of Art.
