= Weavertown Amish Mennonite Church =

Amish congregation in Lancaster County, Pennsylvania, U.S.

Coordinates: 40.0463°N 76.1623°W

Weavertown Amish Mennonite Church is a Beachy Amish Mennonite congregation located in the village of Weavertown, between the somewhat larger villages of Bird-in-Hand and Intercourse in Lancaster County, Pennsylvania, United States.

== History ==
Weavertown shares a history with the churches known as Old Order Amish, and its origin is rooted in issues very important to the Old Order Amish church community of the 1890s. The fundamental issue behind the church division which led to the formation of the Weavertown church was disagreement with the Amish practice of Streng Meidung, the shunning or social avoidance of individuals who had left Amish church fellowship to join other churches. This Streng Meidung was an important issue long before more obvious secondary issues like acceptance or non-acceptance of automobiles, electricity, tractors, central heating, or telephones became significant distinguishing characteristics. On shunning, some Amish felt that it was wrong to pronounce strong social excommunication for what amounted to changes of church membership. Others maintained that church membership was a lifelong commitment, and that the Streng Meidung was a reasonable response toward one forsaking that commitment. In 1910, a group of Old Order Amish church members (about 85 people in 35 families, representing about one-fifth of Old Order Amish membership in Lancaster County at that time) who strongly disagreed with the practice of Streng Meidung commenced meeting as a group somewhat distinct from the rest of the Old Order Amish; this group eventually became the Weavertown Amish Mennonite Church.

The first church services of the group had been held on September 29, 1909, though no ordained ministers were present. The break with the Old Order Amish began on February 27, 1910, when bishops from outside the community were invited to ordain ministers for the new church. This may have occurred at the home of George W. Beiler, near the village of Gordonville, Pennsylvania. Worship services were conducted on alternating Sundays in homes of members, as the Old Order Amish still do today. However, in the fall of 1909, the first meetings were held every three or four weeks. The church group was at first called the Peachey Church (sometimes the Peachey Old Order Church) after an influential preacher and organizer, Samuel W. Peachey, and later the Crist King Church (sometimes the Crist King Old Order Church) after an early bishop, Christian L. King. Christian King separated from the church in 1925, whereupon the church was called the John A. Stoltzfus Church after its new bishop. At this time, church members were very similar to the Old Order Amish in appearance and practice; there was little difference between the two until the new group gradually began to accept the use of telephone and electricity. Use of automobiles was first permitted in 1928. A meeting house, originally built by the Old German Baptist Brethren in 1888, and later part of the Church of the Brethren, was acquired around 1930. The location of the meeting house contributed a permanent name to the congregation: though the building had been named the Bird-in-Hand Church House, it was located nearer the village of Weavertown: from that time, both the building and the people came to be known as the Weavertown Amish Mennonite Church.

== Distinctives ==
Weavertown church members still dress somewhat plainly and distinctively. Women wear the prayer covering, married men grow beards, and members do not make use of broadcast television or radio in their homes or cars. Acceptance of electricity, telephone, central heating, field tractors, and automobiles, however, marks them as quite distinct from the Old Order Amish. In matters of belief, however, except for the difference about the practice of Streng Meidung or shunning, they are quite alike. Amish churches are generally not evangelistic, nor do they generally embrace doctrines like the assurance of salvation, and on these points they are also different from the Weavertown congregation.

Church services at the Weavertown Amish Mennonite Church had been conducted exclusively in High German and Pennsylvania Dutch until 1966; since then services have been conducted in English. Congregational singing has always been unaccompanied by musical instruments. Youth generally attend high school and occasionally college. Youth from the Weavertown church have served terms of voluntary service in Germany, South America, Central America, northern Canada, and various areas of the United States, and generally tour for a week each summer as a choral group.

== Beachy Amish ==
The term Beachy Amish was first used after a similar Amish church division occurred in Somerset County, Pennsylvania, in 1927. In that case, the church opposed to the Streng Meidung came to be called Beachy after their bishop, Moses M. Beachy. In 1950, the Weavertown church was welcomed into full fellowship with the Somerset County and other Beachy congregations. Churches in that group are frequently called Beachy Amish, though in Lancaster County, the term Amish Mennonite is still more common. They have similarities to the Conservative Mennonites.

As of 1996, there were 92 Beachy Amish congregations in the U.S., eight in Canada, one in Costa Rica, two in El Salvador, four in Belize, two in Paraguay, and one in Ireland. Missionary work continues in all the countries named, and also in Kenya and Uganda. 7,238 baptized members were counted as of 1990. Particulars of dress, acceptance of technology, and use of German vary greatly from congregation to congregation. All congregations honor the Schleitheim Confession of 1527 and the Dordrecht Confession of Faith of 1632 as summaries of Christian doctrine and practice.

== Today ==
Because of growth of the Weavertown congregation, three daughter congregations have been established over the years: two in Lancaster County — Pequea (pronounced "peck way") Amish Mennonite Church in 1962, and Mine Road Amish Mennonite Church in 1969; another daughter congregation was established in Washington County, Pennsylvania, in 2000. Other Amish Mennonite churches in Lancaster county include Gap View Amish Mennonite Church, Summitview Christian Fellowship, and Westhaven Amish Mennonite Church.

Membership of the Weavertown congregation in 1990 was about 110 households, with 220 baptized members. Weavertown Mennonite School is across the street from the church. Sunday church services include Sunday School at 9:00 AM and a worship service starts at 10:00 AM. The church has a strong tradition of hospitality and welcomes visitors.
