= Amish furniture =

Furniture manufactured by the Amish

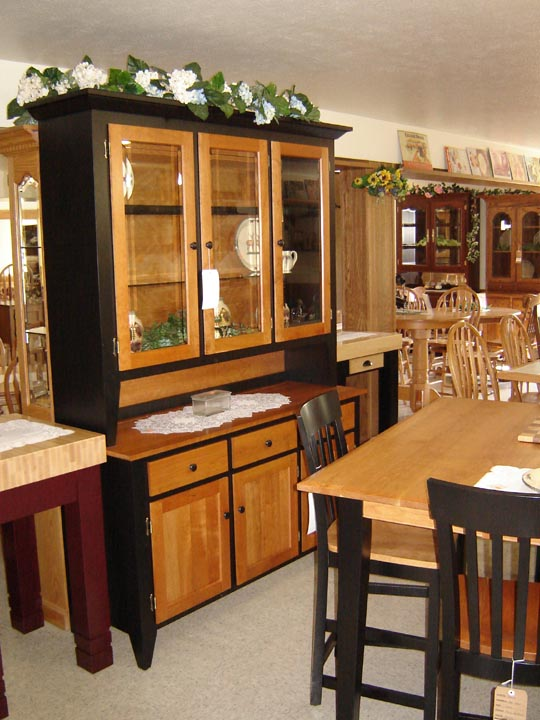
Example of Ohio Amish Wood Craft, Farmerstown Furniture

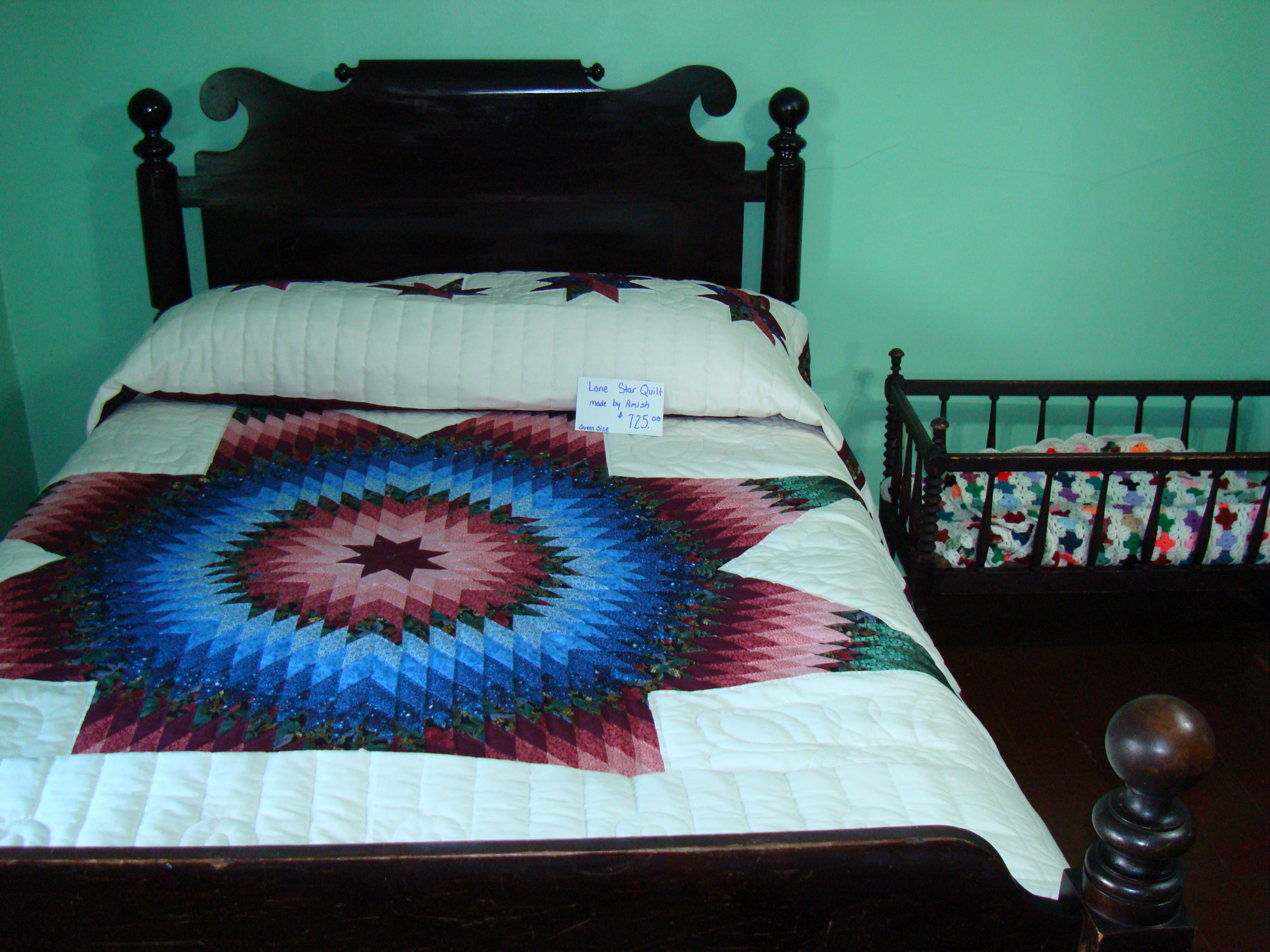
Bed in bedroom at The Amish Village, Strasburg Township, Lancaster County, Pennsylvania

Amish furniture is furniture manufactured by the Amish, primarily of Pennsylvania, Indiana, and Ohio. It is generally known as being made completely out of wood, usually without particle board or laminate. The styles most often used by the Amish woodworkers are generally more traditional in nature.

== History ==
Amish furniture first gained attention in the 1920s, when early American folk art was "discovered", and dealers and historians placed great value upon the beauty and quality of the pieces. Many different styles of Amish furniture emerged. The Jonestown School began in the late 18th century in Lebanon County, Pennsylvania. The Jonestown School is most widely known for painted blanket chests decorated with flowers on three panels. Examples of these chests are on display at both the Smithsonian Museum and the Metropolitan Museum of Art in New York City.

Another distinctive style of Amish furniture is the Soap Hollow School, developed in Soap Hollow, Pennsylvania. These pieces are often brightly painted in red, gold, and black. Henry Lapp was a furniture maker based in Lancaster County, Pennsylvania, and it is his designs that most closely resemble the furniture we think of today as Amish-made. He was one of the first to abandon the painted, Germanic-style influence in his furniture and opted for an undecorated, plain style, following more the styles of Welsh furniture making of the time. The order book he offered to his customers contained watercolor paintings of his pieces and is now in the Philadelphia Museum of Art. The record price for American folk-painted furniture was sold at Sotheby's in 1986. It was a tall case clock made in 1801 by Johannes Spitler that sold for $203,500.

== Techniques ==
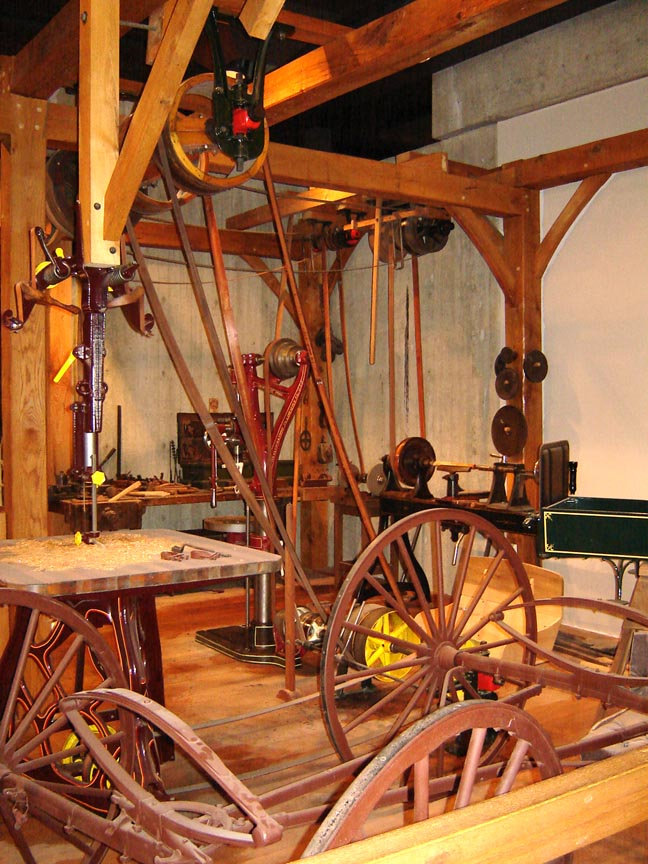
Belt and pulley wood shop similar to what Amish currently use. Exhibit at Ohio Historical Society.

Because Amish beliefs prevent the use of electricity, many woodworking tools in Amish shops are powered by hydraulic and pneumatic power that is run on diesel compressors. Most communities permit some technology, and allowances can be made in the case of woodworking, as the craft often supports multiple families within the community.

Great attention is paid to the details of the wood in the furniture-making process. Each piece of wood is hand-selected to match the specific furniture in mind. Attention is paid to the grain of the wood, both in gluing pieces together and in achieving the desired look of the finished piece. Amish furniture is also valued for its sustainability and is considered a "green" product. The Amish woodworkers pride themselves in their work and view their products as both pieces of art and furnishings to be used and lived in for generations.

== Styles ==
Amish furniture is made in many different styles. The Mission and Shaker styles share a few characteristics. Mission is characterized by straight lines and exposed joinery. It is often considered to be clean and modern in design. The Shaker style is plain, yet elegant and has a very simple and basic design aimed at functionality and durability. The Queen Anne style is in direct contrast to the Mission and Shaker styles. It is considered traditional, with ornate moldings, unique foot details, and carved ornamentation. Other styles available include Southwestern, Rustic, Cottage, Country, Quaker, and Beachfront.

Amish furniture-making is often a skill passed through many generations. Most Amish children rarely attend school beyond eighth grade, often to help out at home, or in the shops. Many families become known for their specific design details and niches. Some woodworkers focus only on outdoor furniture, others on pieces for the living room or bedroom. No piece of furniture is ever identical to another because of the care taken to select the wood. The grain is different on every piece of wood, and the craftsmen often try to highlight the features of each individual piece.

== Technology ==
During the second half of the 19th century, Grand Rapids became a major lumbering center, processing timber harvested in the region. By the end of the century, it was established as the premier furniture-manufacturing city of the United States. For this reason it was nicknamed “Furniture City”. After an international exhibition in Philadelphia in 1876, Grand Rapids became recognized worldwide as a leader in the production of fine furniture.

A furniture-makers’ guild was established in 1931 to improve the design and craftsmanship of Grand Rapids furniture. National home furnishing markets were held in Grand Rapids for about 75 years, concluding in the 1960s. By that time, the furniture-making industry shifted to North Carolina. Much of Grand Rapids furniture has now been outsourced to Asia. In that time, Amish builders have acquired much of the old machinery once used. However, because Amish beliefs prevent the use of electricity, many woodworking tools in Amish shops are powered by hydraulic and pneumatic power that is run on diesel compressors.

In recent years, the Amish furniture market has expanded to include online sales. The Amish craftsmen, because of their beliefs, are prohibited from running the websites. Non-Amish retailers often attend Amish furniture expositions in Ohio and Indiana to see Amish furniture on display and meet the craftsmen behind the pieces. Relationships are often developed, and the retailer becomes the middleman between the simple life of the Amish woodworker and the modern buyer.

Furniture is now available to a wider market and to those who may not be in close proximity to an Amish woodworking shop. It is no longer necessary to visit a retail location to select the unique wood and stain combination desired; this can all be done on the Internet, and there are dozens of different wood, stain, and upholstery options to choose from. The finished furniture is shipped directly from the stain shop to the consumer.

== Wood options ==
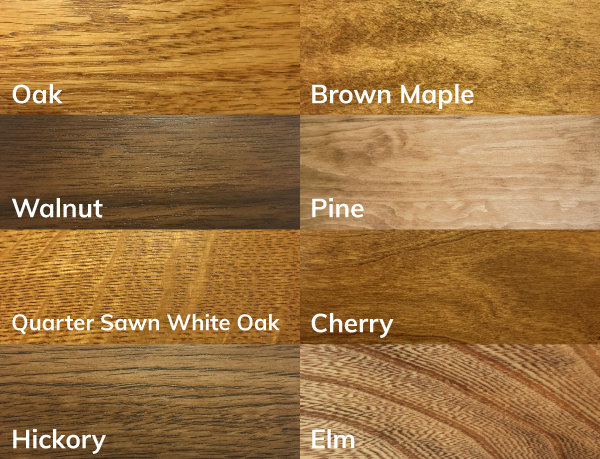
Common wood types for Amish furniture include (clockwise, from top left) Oak, Brown Maple, Pine, Cherry, Elm, Hickory, Quarter Sawn White Oak, and Walnut.

Amish furniture is made with a variety of quality hardwoods, including northern red oak, quarter-sawn white oak, cherry, maple, beech, elm, mahogany, walnut, hickory, cedar, and pine. Northern red oak is a very popular choice for American consumers for its warmth, color, and durability. It is typically grown in Eastern U.S., particularly in the Appalachian Mountains. White oak is slightly harder than red oak and can be cut to show more ray fleck. The antique look of white oak makes it ideal for Mission and Shaker styles. Cherry has a light reddish-brown color that will darken with light exposure. Maple wood offers a spectrum of beauty from different angles, and is popular because of its consistency in grain and taking stain well. Hard (or hard rock) maple is harder than oak, whereas soft maple (also called brown maple) is softer.

American beech is white with a red tinge and bends readily when steamed. Elm ranges in color from nearly white to brown with a red tinge and is fairly stiff and heavy. Mahogany is typically used in high-class furnishings because of its attractive finish. As mahogany matures its color varies from yellowish or pinkish to deep red or brown. Walnut is heavy, hard, and stiff and ranges in color from nearly white in the sapwood to dark brown in the heartwood. Walnut holds stain, paint, and polish well. Hickory is harder than oak and distinguished by extreme contrasts of light and dark colors. Hickory's sapwood is a creamy white while hickory's heartwood is a red, pink or reddish-brown color and often referred to as red hickory. Cedar has a deep rosy glow and stripes of light golden sapwood. Eastern white pine is a soft wood. It tends to have more knots than a hardwood and can yellow with age.
