= Furniture Style =

- Cover of Furniture Style magazine
- Type: Business magazine
- Format: Paper and online magazine
- Owner: Vance Publishing Corp.
- Editor: Romy Schafer
- Founded: 1996
- Ceased publication: 2009
- Language: English
- Headquarters: Lincolnshire, Illinois, USA
- Circulation: 25,000
- ISSN: 1094-6640
- Website: www.furniturestyle.com

Furniture Style (magazine) was a monthly business-to-business magazine and Web site serving home furnishings retailers, specifically furniture retailers, and interior designers. Owned by William C. Vance's Vance Publishing Corp., the magazine was BPA-audited and reaches 25,000 furniture retail professionals in the United States and Canada.

== Overview ==
The magazine was based in Lincolnshire, Illinois, at Vance Publishing's corporate headquarters; it was founded in October 1996. Key members of the editorial staff included Julie M. Smith, publisher; Romy Schafer, editor; Thomas A. Prais & Sara Sandock, managing editors; and Senior Contributing Editor Nancy Robinson. It ceased publication in 2009. The next year, Vance sold the Furniture Style assets to Scranton Gillette Communications.

Furniture Style is also an online retailer of furniture based in the UK, founded in 2011 by Nicola Morgan.

== Content and coverage ==
Furniture Style presented content in a concise, highly visual format that puts product trends at center stage. Topics include merchandising advice, consumer shopping trends and timely news about home furnishings retailers' most profitable product categories, such as bedroom, dining room, entertainment, youth, accent, area rugs, mattresses and upholstery.

== Other publications and properties ==
A.D.I. Awards — Advancing Design & Innovation - Annual home furnishings awards program for Las Vegas Market exhibitors produced by Furniture Style magazine and the World Market Center.

www.furniturestyle.com - Furniture Style launched a new Web site in May 2007 that includes multimedia pods, Style File trend slide shows, Web-only articles, breaking news and editors’ blogs, as well as current and archived articles from the print edition.

Home Fashion Forecast - A quarterly fashion supplement that showcases new products for the whole home, presents color forecasts and interviews with design talent, and offers timely merchandising advice. Previously distributed only at the High Point and Las Vegas markets, Home Fashion Forecast was later available online.

Home Point — Where Furniture Retailers Click – An online focus group of home furnishings retailers that provides the data for Furniture Style's monthly "Retail Matters" column.

The Retail Experience – An annual supplement that provides extensive, exclusive research about home furnishings consumers and their purchase decisions.

== See also ==
- The American Home
