= Beachy Amish =

Amish sect that allows for a limited range of modern technology

Beachy Amish Beachy Mennonites
- Classification: Anabaptist
- Orientation: Conservative Anabaptism
- Scripture: King James Version
- Language: English
- Origin: 1927; Somerset County, Pennsylvania, United States
- Congregations: 154
- Members: 9,310

The Beachy Amish Mennonites, also known as the Beachy Amish or Beachy Mennonites, are a Conservative Anabaptist tradition of Christianity.

Commonalities held by Beachy Amish congregations include adhering to the Dordrecht Confession of Faith and practicing Anabaptist distinctives, such as nonresistance, plain dress, separation from the state, and believer's baptism. They form a loose association of churches without a central governing body. Other Beachy congregations have organized into denominations, such as the Ambassadors Amish Mennonite Churches and the Maranatha Amish-Mennonite Churches.

The Beachy Amish originated as a schism from the Old Order Amish over practices related to church discipline and revivalism, though over time, people from various backgrounds have come to join Beachy Amish congregations. Although they have retained the name "Amish", they are quite different from the Old Order Amish: they neither use horse and buggy for transportation, nor do they have restrictions on technology, except for radio and television; additionally, with a few exceptions, they no longer speak Pennsylvania Dutch. In the years 1946 to 1977, a majority of the Beachy Amish incorporated certain elements of revivalist practice, such as the preaching of the New Birth. The traditionalists who wanted to preserve the old Beachy Amish ways then withdrew and formed their own congregations. Today they are known as Midwest Beachy Amish Mennonites or Old Beachy Amish.

== History ==
The Beachy church arose from a 1927 division in the (Casselman) River Old Order Amish congregation in Somerset County, Pennsylvania. Bishop Moses M. Beachy led the congregation during that time and his name became associated with the faction. The Beachys favored a milder discipline for members whose only offense was transferring membership to other Anabaptist churches, specifically the conservative Amish Mennonite congregation that broke from Moses Beachy's congregation (then not under Beachy's leadership) in 1895.

The Beachy Amish were transformed at mid-20th century into a more evangelical group by both the incorporation of revivalist Amish who had left their original churches and joined the Beachy Amish and by a growing revivalist influence within the Beachys. One especially influential man in Lancaster County was an Amish (and later Beachy Amish) evangelist from Oklahoma, David A. Miller. Through his and other revivalist influences an Amish youth group evolved known as the "Goodies" due to their emphasis on a renewed spiritual life and avoiding the period of rumspringa as experienced in many Amish youth groups. Many of the "Goodies" eventually joined the Beachy Amish community in Lancaster County.

== Beliefs and distinctives ==
In contrast to the Old Order Amish, the Beachys have meetinghouses, Sunday School, and a Bible School for young adults, and most also support missionary work. Excommunication is used less frequently and accompanying bans are even rarer.

Many Beachy churches identify as being a part of the Conservative Mennonite tradition, though they have retained certain practices and a lifestyle similar to the Old Order Amish, including:

- Women wear head covering
- Married men have beards in most congregations
- Television and radio are forbidden

Practices that distinguish the Beachy church from the Old Order Amish include:

- Ownership of personal automobiles.
- Most do not speak Pennsylvania Dutch.
- Filtered Internet is permitted by most congregations
- Men wear ready-made clothing

Beachy Amish Mennonites differ from other Conservative Mennonites in that their congregations usually have more autonomy, as opposed to a stronger centralized governance.

== Denominations ==
Branches off of the Beachy Amish Mennonite Church include more conservative denominations, such as the Ambassadors Amish Mennonite Churches, the Maranatha Amish-Mennonite Churches, and the more traditional Old Beachy Amish, also called Midwest Beachy Amish-Mennonites, who retained much of the traditions of 1940s and 50s, including the use of the German language in church and everyday life. The Tampico or Kauffman Amish Mennonites also retained much of the old Amish traditions, including Pennsylvania Dutch and Hochdeutsch.

== Population and distribution ==
According to a graph at beachyam.org, an unofficial website of the Beachy Amish, the membership had risen from less than 3,000 in 1957 to more than 11,000 in 2009.

In 2006, there were 11,487 Beachy members in 207 churches. In 2020, the states with the highest representation were Pennsylvania, Kansas and Ohio. However, the county with the highest proportion is Macon County, Georgia, with 3.41% of the population in 2020 being Beachy Amish adherents. International Beachy churches or mission work can be found in El Salvador, Belize, Nicaragua, Costa Rica, Paraguay, Ireland, Ukraine, Romania, Kenya, Australia, and Canada. Mission work is sponsored by Amish Mennonite Aid (AMA), Mennonite Interests Committee (MIC), or individual churches.

In 2017, there were 9,310 Beachy Amish members in 154 churches worldwide according to the Global Anabaptist Mennonite Encyclopedia Online (GAMEO). There were churches in the US, Belize, Costa Rica, El Salvador, Ireland, Kenya, Nicaragua, Paraguay, Romania and Ukraine.

== Worship ==
The most common hymnary used by the Beachy Amish is the Christian Hymnary (1972). The hymn book, Hymns of the Church, (2011), edited by John D. Martin, is gaining in popularity among the denomination.

== See also ==
- Weavertown Amish Mennonite Church – Oldest existing Beachy church

== Literature ==
- Cory Anderson and Jennifer Anderson. The Amish-Mennonites across the Globe. Acorn Publishing, 2019.
- Cory Anderson: The Amish-Mennonites of North America: A Portrait of Our People. Ridgeway Publishing, 2012.
- Alvin J. Beachy: The Rise and Development of the Beachy Amish Mennonite Churches. Mennonite Quarterly Review, Vol. 29, No. 2, 1955, pages 118–40.
- Aaron Lapp: Weavertown Church History. Sugarcreek: Carlisle Printing 2003.
- J. B. Mast: Facts Concerning the Beachy A. M. Division of 1927. Meyersdale, PA 1950.
- Mennonite Church Information 2007. Harrisonburg: Christian Light Publications 2007.
- Devon Miller: Amish Mennonite Directory. Millersburg, OH 2008. A directory of all US and Canadian Amish Mennonites, including the Beachys.
- Dorthy Schwieder and Elmer Schwieder: The Beachy Amish in Iowa: A Case Study. Mennonite Quarterly Review, Vol. 51, No. 1, 1977 pp. 41–51.
- Elmer S. Yoder: The Beachy Amish Mennonite Fellowship Churches. Hartville, OH 1987.
