= List of Anabaptist churches =

This is a list of Anabaptist churches and communities.

Anabaptism includes Amish, Hutterite, Mennonite, Bruderhof, Schwarzenau Brethren, River Brethren and Apostolic Christian denominations.

Some individual congregations, church buildings, or communities are individually notable, such as by being listed as historic sites. In the United States some of these are listed on the National Register of Historic Places. In South Dakota, a number of Hutterite colonies were considered and NRHP-listed together.

Anabaptist churches include:

== In the United States ==
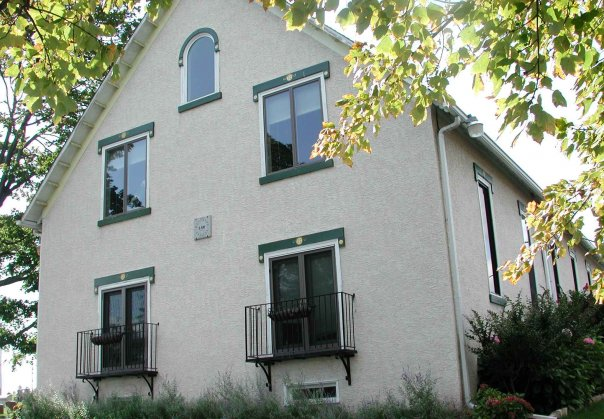
The Meeting House Law Building and Gallery, Spring City, Pennsylvania, in 2009

- Alexanderwohl Mennonite Church, Goessel, Kansas
- Alleghany Mennonite Meetinghouse, Brecknock Township, Pennsylvania, NRHP-listed
- Assembly Mennonite Church, Goshen, Indiana
- Bruderhof Communities, international
- Bon Homme Hutterite Colony, Tabor, South Dakota, NRHP-listed
- Casselton Mennonite Church, Casselton, North Dakota, built as an Episcopal church, was a Mennonite church during 1950-2002, NRHP-listed
- Charity Christian Fellowship
- College Mennonite Church, Goshen, Indiana
- Eighth Street Mennonite Church, Goshen, Indiana
- Former Reformed Mennonite Church, Williamsville, New York, NRHP-listed
- Hans Herr House, West Lampeter Township, Pennsylvania
- Howard-Miami Mennonite Church, Indiana
- Mennonite Meetinghouse, Philadelphia, Pennsylvania, NRHP-listed
- Mennoville Mennonite Church, El Reno, Oklahoma, NRHP-listed
- Oak Grove Mennonite Church, Smithville, Ohio, started as an Amish church
- Prairie Street Mennonite Church, Indiana
- Weavertown Amish Mennonite Church, Weavertown, Pennsylvania
- Yellow Creek Mennonite Church, Indiana

== House churches ==
Some Anabaptists, such as the Old-Order Amish, do not have a fixed place of worship but meet instead for Sunday services in rotating order, at the homes of church Elders and other prominent members of the community. Inasmuch as some in attendance have traveled relatively long distances by wagon in order to participate, it is expected that the family hosting the services will afterwards provide a hearty meal for all present with the help of other families. Weddings are also performed at the home of the bride's parents and not in a church.
