= Olive Mennonite Church =

Coordinates: 41.607446°N 86.022527°W

Olive Mennonite Church is a Mennonite Church located just outside Wakarusa, Indiana, and a member of the Indiana-Michigan Mennonite Conference of Mennonite Church USA.

== History ==
Olive Mennonite Church (then often referred to as Shaum Mennonite) began as an outpost of Yellow Creek Mennonite Church. The congregation met in a log building until they erected a meeting house on the current site in 1862. The small congregation was ministered to by preachers such as Daniel Moyer, Daniel Brenneman, Jacob Wisler, and John F. Funk as it served as an extension of the hub of Yellow Creek Mennonite Church.

The first recorded ordination within Olive Mennonite Church took place in 1871, when Henry Christophel was made Deacon.

The first Mennonite Sunday school in Indiana was initiated at Olive in 1867.

In 1888 a brick building replaced the existing frame structure. Soon after the opening service in the new facility (Christmas Day 1888), the congregation began to be called Olive Mennonite, so named after the township in which it was located.

J.C. Wenger, Mennonite historian and author, served as interim minister at Olive beginning in 1949, and became bishop in 1951, serving in that position until 1964. Wenger also wrote the church's institutional history.

== Today ==
Today, Olive Mennonite Church has an average weekly attendance of between 100 and 125 people.

In addition to weekly church services, Olive's ministries include a youth group, Vacation Bible School (begun in 1936), and a ladies daytime sewing (The first sewing circle at Olive began in 1916).

Olive Mennonite supports the work of Mennonite Central Committee as well as other Mennonite organizations and ministries such as Church Community Services, Faith Mission of Elkhart, and Hope Ministries, located in South Bend, Indiana.

Olive Mennonite Church will celebrate its 150th anniversary in 2012 with an event in April and another in September.

Historical records of Olive Mennonite Church can be found at the Mennonite Church USA Archives located on the campus of Goshen College in Goshen, Indiana.
