= Prairie Street Mennonite Church =

Coordinates: 41.675192°N 85.965164°W

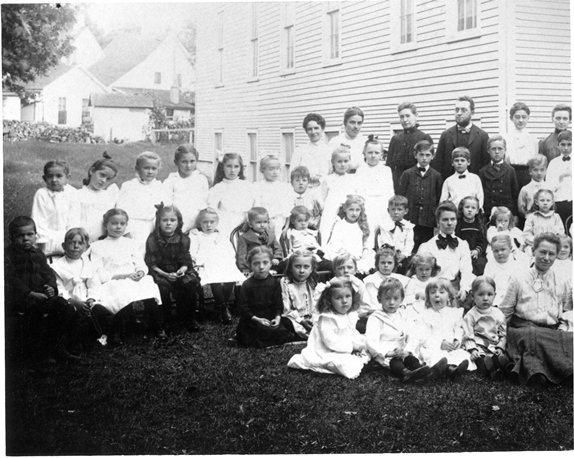
A group photograph of children attending Sunday school at Prairie Street Mennonite Church in 1905

Prairie Street Mennonite Church is a Mennonite Church located in Elkhart, Indiana. It is a member of the Indiana-Michigan Mennonite Conference of Mennonite Church USA.

== History ==
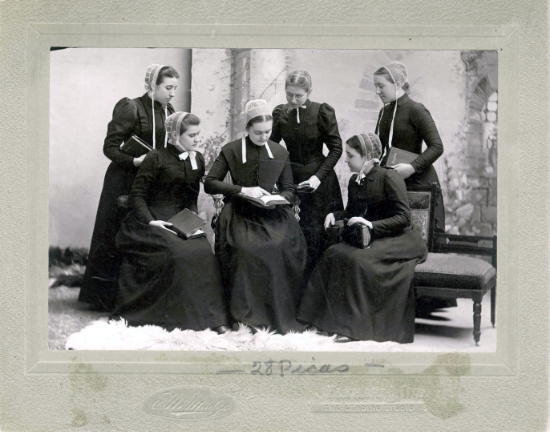
Members of Prairie Street Mennonite Church illustrating plain Mennonite clothing (back row, right: Elsie (Kolb) Bender, Harold S. Bender's mother).

Prairie Street began in 1870 as a gathering of Mennonites who lived in Elkhart and regularly attended other churches in the county, such as Yellow Creek Mennonite Church, and Shaum Mennonite Church (now Olive Mennonite Church) which met every other week. John F. Funk bought a plot of land for the church building just outside the city limit to allay concerns about how the Mennonite faith would hold up in an urban context. The first meeting in the current location, on the eponymous Prairie Street, took place on 26 November 1871.

In 1879, John S. Coffman was invited by John F. Funk to join the staff of the Herald of Truth and he began attending Prairie Street Mennonite Church, where he promoted Sunday school and preached.

Other noted early leaders at Prairie Street Mennonite include:

- Daniel H. Bender
- George L. Bender
- H. B. Brenneman
- John E. Hartzler, who served as president of Goshen College from 1913 to 1918.
- Jonas S. Hartzler, pastor at Prairie Street from 1923 to 1940, had previously taught at the Elkhart Institute and then at Goshen College.
- A. B. Kolb, who authored the Mennonite hymn "Christ who Left His Home in Glory."
- Menno Steiner

In 1895, Prairie Street Mennonite Church member Lewis Kulp purchased 5 acres of land on what is now Hively Avenue, and the Prairie Street Cemetery was created. Land was added to the property over many years. In 1998, the church donated the cemetery and surrounding undeveloped land to the City of Elkhart.

In 1931, the Prairie Street Mennonite Church building was burned in a fire so severely that it needed to be rebuilt.

Fourteen men from Prairie Street drafter during World War II opted to participate in the Civilian Public Service rather than participate in combat.

=== Women's Contributions ===
In 1934, Prairie Street women began canning fruits and vegetables for use at Goshen College, and during World War II, they did the same for Civilian Public Service camps, Mennonite Voluntary Service, and Bethany Christian Schools.

Nellie Mann Witmer, Minnie Graber, and Juanita Mann Wittrig, all Prairie Street members, served as president of the Indiana-Michigan Women's Missionary and Service Commission and Graber also served as the president of the church-wide WMSC from 1958 to 1969.

=== Innovations ===
Prairie Street was the first Mennonite church in its conference to:

- Have a Christmas Program (1890)
- Hold a church wedding (1894)
- Begin a Young People's Meeting (1897)
- Commission Missionaries (1899)
- Begin a Sewing Circle (1895)

Both Mennonite Central Committee and Mennonite Mission Network began in part through the initiative of Prairie Street Mennonite Church.

Prairie Street was instrumental in beginning Belmont Mennonite Church and True Vine Tabernacle (Formerly Roselawn Mennonite Church), also in Elkhart, Indiana, and Pleasant View Mennonite Church in Jefferson Township, Elkhart County, Indiana.

== Today ==
As of 2006, Prairie Street Mennonite Church had an average attendance of 130. Located in a neighborhood equal parts African-American, Caucasian, and Hispanic, Prairie Street initiated programs designed to reach out to the community, including Vacation Bible School (with Hively Avenue Mennonite), neighborhood block parties, and Jubilee House, a unit of Mennonite Voluntary Service. Congregation members often volunteer as tutors at the local elementary school. Prairie Street Mennonite partnered with the Elkhart Area Ministerial Association to organize tutoring in English as a Second Language, hosting the tutoring. Prairie Street Mennonite Church pursued a partnership with Community Missionary Baptist Church which is located down the street, through pulpit exchanges, joint tutoring, and an effort to save the local school building.

=== Mennonite Voluntary Service House ===
Prairie Street Mennonite Church sponsored Jubilee House, a unit of Mennonite Voluntary Service located adjacent to the church. In 2008, MVSers at Jubilee House appeared dressed as superheroes to promote awareness of male-pattern violence. In 2010, MVS workers began the Jubilee House Neighborhood Demonstration Garden. Using recycled and reused gardening equipment, they created a garden to educate neighbors about the possibilities of urban gardening as well as to provide some free produce.

Some of Prairie Street Mennonite Church's historical records are housed in the Mennonite Church USA Archives, while others remain in the congregation's possession.
