= Lucy Winchester (novel) =

Novel

First edition

Lucy Winchester is a novel by Mennonite author Christmas Carol Kauffman. It is a semi-biographical adaptation of the life of Bessie Viola Lain, published in 1945 by Herald Press, a Mennonite publishing house.

== Writing ==
Kauffman began collecting material for the novel through conversations with Bessie Lain, who was a member of the Mennonite Gospel Mission that Kauffman and her husband, Nelson E. Kauffman, founded in Hannibal, Missouri. The first 13 chapters of the novel were written while Kauffman was hospitalized in Hannibal after the birth of her fourth child, in September 1942. Lain insisted that Kauffman use pseudonyms for the novel's characters, except for two characters, Gussie Jenkins and Norvena Sellers, and Kauffman adapted her story of conversion into the semi-biographical novel, renaming Lain as "Lucy Winchester."

== Publication ==
Lucy Winchester was first serialized in Herald Press' youth magazine, the Youth's Christian Companion. Although Kauffman had previously published more than 100 short stories in the magazine, Lucy Winchester was her first full-length novel. After strong reader response to the magazine's serial presentation, Kauffman was notified by A.J. Metzler, Clayton F. Yake, and Paul Erb that the novel had been accepted by the Mennonite Publication Board for release in 1945 by the Mennonite Publishing House in Scottdale, Pennsylvania. Since its initial publication, the novel has been re-released by Moody Publishers, in 1969 and 1974, and by Christian Light Publications, in 1992. The book is still for sale from Christian Light Publications.

A manuscript and publishing records for the book are housed at the Mennonite Church USA Archives, in the personal papers of Christmas Carol Kauffman.
