= Christmas Carol Kauffman =

American author

- Born: December 25, 1901; Elkhart, Indiana
- Died: January 30, 1969 (aged 67); Elkhart, Indiana
- Education: Hesston College
- Spouse(s): Norman Hostetler, Nelson E. Kauffman

Christmas Carol Kauffman (December 25, 1901 – January 30, 1969) was an American author of Mennonite Christian literature. Kauffman was best known for her semi-biographical novels, and her writings were largely based on the life stories of people she met through the mission work she performed with her husband, pastor Nelson E. Kauffman. She is the mother of James Kauffman.

== Biography ==
=== Early life ===
Christmas Carol Miller was born on December 25, 1901, in Elkhart, Indiana, to Selena and Abraham Miller, and named in honor of her Christmas-morning birth. She graduated from Elkhart High School, after which she worked a clerk job, and enrolled for a short time at Goshen College. On April 16, 1924, Christmas Carol was married to Norman Hostetler; on June 16, 1926, he was electrocuted while installing a radio antenna.

=== Remarriage and Hannibal Mission work ===
In January 1928, at the suggestion of Bishop Jacob K. Bixler, Christmas Carol Hostetler took a vacation from her employment at a sewing shop and enrolled in a six-week winter Bible term at Hesston College. Here she began to recognize a strong interest in applying herself to mission work, although she had previously been unwilling to follow her husband Norman's plan to travel to India to work in missions. Christmas Carol left her sewing shop job and enrolled for another semester at Hesston College, where she met Nelson E. Kauffman, who shared her new interest in missions. The two married on June 10, 1929. After Nelson had completed a degree from Hesston College and spent several years teaching, Christmas Carol and Nelson began seeking out opportunities for service positions.

In Spring of 1934, the two accepted the Mennonite General Mission Board's call to start a mission church in Hannibal, Missouri. This Gospel Mission was founded in Hannibal on June 3, 1934, under the South Central Mennonite Conference, and would eventually become known as the Mennonite Mission Church. While serving in the area for the next 22 years, their mission work received national recognition, Nelson was appointed as bishop over five congregations and as President of the Mennonite Board of Education, and Christmas Carol published several novels based on stories of those she met or stories which were submitted to her. Of particular note is the work of the Hannibal mission within several Missouri prisons, work which resulted in the conversion and baptism of Johnnie Allison, who would eventually be convicted of the murder of his father-in-law. As a result of a personal connection with Nelson and Christmas Carol Kauffman, Allison became passionately religious, and worked to convert other prisoners, even creating a Mennonite church within the Missouri State Penitentiary in Jefferson City. Johnnie Allison and Christmas Carol Kauffman would collaborate to publish the story of his conversion under the name Life with Life, although Allison's wife raised a libel lawsuit over its publication. After his release, Allison maintained a friendship with the Kauffmans, and even visited Christmas Carol while she was hospitalized in Elkhart, Indiana.

After ending their mission work in Hannibal in 1956, the Kauffmans moved to Elkhart, Indiana, where Nelson served as Secretary of Home Missions for the Mennonite Mission Board and the two began attending Belmont Mennonite Church. Christmas Carol remained in Elkhart until her death in 1969.

=== Writing career ===
Christmas Carol Kauffman's writing career began during her studies at Hesston College, when C.F. Yake, one of her professors, asked Christmas Carol to submit a short story to the magazine he served as editor of, the Youth’s Christian Companion. She would go on to write more than 100 stories for the weekly, and several of her novels were serialized within the Companion before being published. Christmas Carol wrote in longhand, standing up at a table or desk, and these pages were sent to friends or typists to be typed into manuscripts. Although she gathered information for her first novel for two years, Carol did not begin writing the manuscript, the life story of a Hannibal congregant which would become Lucy Winchester, until during her hospital stay after giving birth to her fourth child, in September 1942.

After the successful publication of Lucy Winchester, Christmas Carol would go on to write a number of other similar semi-biographical novels, including Light from Heaven, Dannie of Cedar Cliffs, Search to Belong, Hidden Rainbow, and For One Moment, as well as the historical fiction novel, Not Regina, all of which were initially published by Mennonite Publishing House.

=== Death ===
In 1967, Christmas Carol was admitted to Elkhart General Hospital and diagnosed with infectious hepatitis. She eventually recovered and was able to return home, but in January 1969, she was readmitted and died of hepatitis on January 30, 1969.

== Legacy ==
Kauffman's novels were widely read at the time of their publication, and several are still in print today, in editions by Christian Light Publications. Her works have been translated into Japanese, German, Norwegian, Finnish, and French.

Christmas Carol's personal papers and publishing files are housed in the Mennonite Church USA Archives.

== Published works ==
- Lucy Winchester (1945)
- Light from Heaven (1948)
- Dannie of Cedar Cliffs (1950)
- Life with Life (1952)
- Not Regina (1954)
- Hidden Rainbow (1957)
- For One Moment (1960)
- Search to Belong (1963)
- One Boy's Battle (also published as Unspoken Love) (1971)
- Escape from Kyburg Castle (1991)
- Little Pete and Other Stories (1992)
