= College Mennonite Church =

Mennonite Church in Goshen, Indiana, US

Coordinates: 41.5628°N 85.8270°W

College Mennonite Church (CMC) is a Mennonite Church located in Goshen, Indiana, and a member of the Indiana-Michigan Mennonite Conference of Mennonite Church USA.

== History ==
College Mennonite Church (CMC) is so named because it was founded following the creation of Goshen College, formerly the Elkhart Institute. The charter members fought to be organized as a union congregation in 1904; they would hold membership in both Mennonite and Amish Mennonite conferences.

The first preacher was Jonas S. Hartzler.

The congregation first met in Hartzler's home but met in buildings of Goshen College as soon as they were constructed, first the dining hall and then the assembly hall .

The first Sunday school was organized at CMC in 1904. In late 1904 and 1905, CMC commissioned several missionaries (Lydia Schertz, Anna Stalter, and Martin Clifford Lehman) bound for India. Soon after, the church began to support "home missions" in Chicago and Fort Wayne, Indiana. By 1909, College Mennonite had begun a Working Girls Missionary Society and a sewing circle.

In the 1930s, College Mennonite allocated somewhere between 40% and 52% of its budget toward missions efforts.

CMC, along with Goshen College students' Young People's Christian Association, helped begin the Sunday schools that became North Goshen Mennonite Church and East Goshen Mennonite Church.

=== Closure of Goshen College in 1923 ===
Goshen College closed for the 1923–24 school year after many students and some faculty left in protest of the appointment of Daniel Kauffman as college president. This conflict carried over into the ranks of CMC, with many members, including Jonas S. Hartzler leaving and joining Eighth Street Mennonite Church, then a part of the General Conference Mennonite Church. Of the 213 members in 1923, only between 15 and 30 remained in the fall of 1924, though accounts differ. Many new faculty and students joined when Goshen College reopened, and the church was reorganized.

=== Breakaway by assembly ===
Beginning in the 1960s, students at Goshen College began asking for an alternative "campus church" to College Mennonite. An alternative Sunday school class was formed, and later a "K-group" ("K" stands for "Koinonia," Greek for "fellowship") named "Metanoia" (Greek for "repentance"). Ultimately Metanoia separated from CMC in the mid-1970s and created "the Assembly" (now Assembly Mennonite Church). The two congregations continued to collaborate on children's Sunday school for a time and had a combined youth group until 1986.

== Church-chapel building ==
The large College Mennonite congregation grew too large for the Assembly Room in the Administration building of Goshen College and, for the decade of 1950–1959, met in the newly constructed gymnasium in the Student Union building. Great dissatisfaction with the space as a place of worship as well as the facilities for Sunday school led to planning for a new building, one that would be jointly owned by the college and the congregation.

The building, designed by architect Orus Eash, who had previously designed several other buildings on campus, was dedicated on April 3, 1960. It consisted of a circular sanctuary surrounded by a square of classrooms. An organ was added in 1970.

== Notable members (past and present) ==
Notable members of CMC are:

- Atlee Beechy
- Noah E. Byers
- J. Robert Detweiler, of The Calvary Hour
- Jonas S. Hartzler
- Guy F. Hershberger
- Amos E. Kreider
- John H. Mosemann Jr.
- Noah Oyer
- C. Henry Smith
- Sanford Calvin Yoder
- Rachel Fisher
- Nancy Kauffmann

== Today ==
College Mennonite Church had an average weekly attendance of 600–650 as recently as 2006, with 13–14 pastoral care visitors, in addition to pastors, who visit about 200 members a week.

Local service efforts include participation with the Goshen Interfaith Hospitality Network, relief work in response to hurricanes and tornadoes (through Mennonite Disaster Service), a jail ministry called the Jailhouse Sisters and partnerships with voluntary service units in the United Kingdom.

College Mennonite members participate in small groups, neighborhood groups, nurture groups, and a choir. There are organized groups for youth in middle school and high school and Sunday school classes for all ages.

Members of all ages participate in L.I.F.E. (Living in Fellowship Every Wednesday) services and evening programs.

CMC holds an annual Vacation Bible School in partnership with other Mennonite churches located in Goshen: Assembly Mennonite Church, Iglesia Menonita del Buen Pastor, Faith Mennonite Church, and Eighth Street Mennonite Church.

While CMC retains some of its historical records, many are housed in the Mennonite Church USA Archives in Goshen, Indiana.
