= Indiana-Michigan Mennonite Conference =

The Indiana-Michigan Mennonite Conference is a regional conference of Mennonite Church USA that consists of 77 congregations in Michigan, Indiana, Kentucky and Tennessee.

== History ==
The Indiana-Michigan Mennonite Conference was formed as a conference of the "Old" Mennonite Church (MC) in 1916 between a pre-existing Indiana-Michigan Mennonite Conference and the Indiana-Michigan Amish Mennonite Conference.

=== Indiana-Michigan Mennonite Conference (pre-1916) ===
Beginning in the 1850s, the Indiana Conference was primarily under the oversight of the Ohio Mennonite Conference, with leaders from both states attending each other's conference meetings. In 1895 the minutes of the conference meetings added "Michigan" to the name of the conference, apparently the first record of the name change, though there is no record of official process to make this change.

In 1911, the conference created the semi-autonomous Indiana-Michigan Mennonite Mission Board.

=== Indiana-Michigan Amish Mennonite Conference ===
Beginning after the dissolution of the Amish Mennonite general conference ("Diener-Versammlung" 1862-1878), the first meeting was in 1888 at the Maple Grove Church near Topeka, Indiana. This conference became known as the "spring conference," in contrast to the Mennonite "fall conference," with some ministers of each conference attending both. In 1916, just before the merger, the Indiana-Michigan Amish Mennonite Conference contained 11 congregations with a total of 1,539 members (not including the "union" College Mennonite Church which was a member of both the Mennonite and Amish Mennonite conferences).

=== The Merger ===
The close relations of the two conferences resulted in a "Committee on Conference Union" which met on February 13, 1913. Following the positive responses from both conferences, a new Constitution, Rules, and Disciplines was drafted and then voted on at the respective conference meetings of 1916, ratified by large majorities.

== Today ==
According to the Indiana-Michigan Mennonite Conference's website, it has over 10,000 members in 77 congregations concentrated in Michiana but also as far away as Antioch, Tennessee (Harmony Mennonite Church).

In 1954, the conference founded Bethany Christian High School (now Bethany Christian Schools). The conference also founded Camp Amigo (now called Amigo Centre, located in Sturgis, Michigan, in 1957. Both of these ventures continue under the conference's oversight.

The conference's publication is the Gospel Evangel, published since 1973.

The records of many of the congregations of the Indiana-Michigan Mennonite Conference, as well as those of the conference itself, can be found at the Mennonite Church USA Archives.

== Congregations ==
Assembly Mennonite Church
College Mennonite Church
Olive Mennonite Church
Prairie Street Mennonite Church
Yellow Creek Mennonite Church
