= Mennonite Publishing Company =

Defunct American publishing company

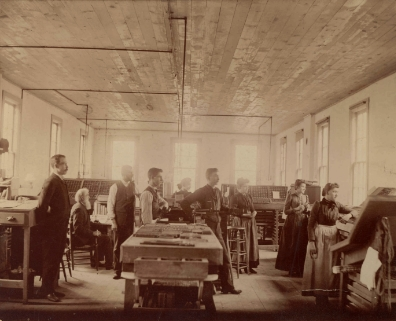
The Mennonite Publishing Company's composing room in the 1880s in Goshen, Indiana.

The Mennonite Publishing Company was a publishing agency in Elkhart, Indiana, operating primarily from 1875 to 1908, which under John F. Funk served as the main source of published material for the (old) Mennonite Church. The Mennonite Publishing Company was the third and final agency through which Funk published a great deal of historical and denominational Mennonite texts and periodicals, having previously published as "John F. Funk" from 1864 to 1869 and "John F. Funk and Brother" from 1869 to 1874.

== History ==
=== Founding and Operation ===
The creation of the Mennonite Publishing Company followed Funk's move to Elkhart, Indiana, from Chicago, at which point he purchased his own hand-powered printing press and ink. In 1868, Funk constructed a two-story building at 320 South Main Street in Elkhart for hosting his presses, and this property was transferred to the Publishing Company when it was chartered in 1875. As of 1892 these two floors and the basement were all occupied by the company, which operated a bookstore on the building's first floor and had increased their printing capability to 5 presses.

=== Published Texts ===
One of Funk and the Mennonite Publishing Company's most significant and widely distributed texts was the Herald of Truth, the first periodical of the (old) Mennonite Church. Other notable texts released by the Publishing Company include English and German editions of Menno Simons' Complete Works and the Martyr's Mirror, as well as the "Old" Mennonite Church's "hymnals, catechisms, confessions, yearbooks, Sunday-school literature, etc." In God Uses Ink, John A. Hostetler suggests that the historical and contemporary texts Funk chose to publish through the Mennonite Publishing Company represented his "convincement of the worth of the historic Mennonite faith and its principles for a new generation of believers."

=== Decline ===
Around the start of the 20th century, conflicts surrounding the Mennonite Publishing Company began to arise. John F. Funk was removed from his position as a bishop of the Mennonite church, church members began to argue that a Mennonite publishing agency should be owned by the church it represented, two rival Mennonite publishing organizations named the Gospel Witness Company and the Mennonite Book and Tract Society were established, and the company faced financial difficulties after a bank failure. On March 26, 1907, a fire which destroyed half of the Mennonite Publishing Company's physical operations served as a final blow to the company's fortunes. The last issue of the Herald of Truth was published on April 9, 1908, and Funk announced that the newly founded Mennonite Publication Board had purchased the Mennonite Publishing Company's periodicals. The company's employees purchased its printing equipment and buildings and organized a new commercial printing company, through which Funk continued printing under the Mennonite Publishing Company name.

=== Legacy ===
After the sale of the company's periodicals to the church's new Mennonite Publication Board, the board established the Mennonite Publishing House in Scottdale, Pennsylvania, where publication of denominational texts continued. During this sale the church board requested that the Mennonite Publishing Company cease identifying itself in connection with the Mennonite church, so that the responsibilities of church publication could be transferred to the board. The Herald of Truth was combined with the periodical of a competing publishing house, the Gospel Witness Company, to form a new denominational periodical, the Gospel Herald.

The papers of founder John F. Funk are housed at the Mennonite Church USA Archives.
