= The Pax Program =

American Mennonite service organization

The Pax Project was an American Mennonite service organization for conscientious objectors that operated overseas.

== History ==
The Pax program operated between 1951 and 1976. It was first imagined by Calvin Redekop and Paul Peachy, who both worked for Mennonite Central Committee at the time, as a way for Mennonites to help rebuild post-war Europe and serve as a voluntary service option in the draft. Political developments focused the project of providing resettlement housing for the Danzig Mennonite refugees. The first team arrived in Espelkamp, Germany on April 6, 1951, and lived in renovated gas munitions bunkers. Pax provided housing for 270 German families, as well as a Mennonite Meetinghouse for the community.

In June 1951, the US Congress passed the Universal Military Training and Service Act, which established the I-W program. One of the ways in which I-W differed from Civilian Public Service during World War II, was that it allowed conscientious objectors to perform alternative service overseas. General Lewis B. Hershey visited the Pax site in Germany and approved the program for alternative service credit. The members of the program financed their services with a $75 fee, either paid by them or their home congregation. Some used wages earned by specific employing agencies such as the Le-Tourneau Foundation in Peru.

In 1952, the program began its first agricultural development undertaking in Macedonia. This began the expansion from building projects and relief work to international development.

=== Termination ===
The Pax Program stopped sending volunteers in 1973 and was entirely shut down by 1976. Reasons for closing the program included the fact that the original purpose of refugee assistance had ended by 1960, and the draft was terminated by the end of 1972. The efforts of those who might have served in Pax were directed towards other MCC programs.

== People ==
A. Lloyd Swartzentruber was the first Pax Pastor. He was in charge of the mental and spiritual well-being of Pax volunteers in Europe during 1951 and 1952. He and his wife Mary were affectionately called "Pop and Mom," terms that continued to be used by the patriarch and matriarch figures of the Pax Program in Europe.

Menno Wiebe was secretly arrested in Paraguay. He was interrogated and his Pax fellows had to smuggle his passport and later food and blankets for the night. He was released the next day after the MCC Director in Paraguay negotiated with the American and British Embassies.

=== Deaths ===
Several volunteers died while serving in Pax, one of the most difficult was when Larry Kauffman was serving in the Democratic Republic of the Congo in 1958. On a trip on the Kasai River, he disappeared while the group was going to shore to make camp. He might have slipped into the river and been pulled under by the current, no one can be sure.

Another very painful situation happened in Vietnam in 1962. The program was still operating during the Vietnam War. Daniel Gerber was abducted by the Viet Cong. His fiance escaped, but after returning briefly to the US, returned to continue their service. She was then captured and killed. No more was ever discovered about Gerber's disappearance.

== Legacy ==
By the time the program stopped sending volunteers in 1973, Pax had sent about 1,180 men to 42 different countries around the world. The program's ethic was non-bureaucratic and the basic philosophy was to "get the job done." The MCC executive committee did a focused review in 1957 and concluded that, "the Pax program has been making a unique and valuable contribution in the relief and mission outreach. Our churches and young men continue to have a strong interest in this service and new opportunities for service should be sought. The Pax program had a deep impact on the lives of many young men, and almost all agreed that their years of service were "the most important years of [their] lives."

Arlin Hunsberger, whose Pax experience led him to a career of international development said, "I believe that the Pax program played a crucial role in exposing many young people of the church to the broader needs of people throughout the world. It was a powerful instrument in getting people out of their close, sometimes almost closed communities into situations that made them ponder and search for different ways of moving through life."

The Mennonite Church USA Archives are the official repository for the Pax Program.
