= Knoxville Mennonite Church =

Mennonite church in Knoxville, Tennessee

Knoxville Mennonite Church (KMC) is a Mennonite church located in Knoxville, Tennessee, and a member of the Central District Conference of Mennonite Church USA.

== History ==
The church was started by Charles B. Byers and his wife when they came to Knoxville, Tennessee in 1917 in a large two-story house on 1308 West 4th Street. Some years later the church was supported by the Virginia Mission Board. In 1921, the church moved to a brick building at the corner of West 4th Street and the University Avenue. In 1977 the member of the church decided to move to the Cumberland Estates area on four acres of land, on which the church remains to the present.

=== Present congregation ===
The present congregation is composed of about 60 persons, about 70 percent of these are non-ethnic Mennonites. They are blue-collar workers, skilled tradesmen, and professional people.
