= John Coffman =

John Coffman may refer to:

- John S. Coffman (1848–1899), leader in the Mennonite Church
- John Coffman, developer of LILO (boot loader)
