= Emma Richards (minister) =

Emma Elizabeth Richards (née Sommers; March 17, 1927 – September 6, 2014) was the first Mennonite woman to be ordained as a pastor of a Mennonite congregation.

== Biography ==
=== Early life and education ===
Emma Richards was born on March 17, 1927. She received a bachelor of arts degree at Goshen College in 1949. She received a bachelor of theology at Goshen Biblical Seminary. She then taught at Bluffton College.

=== Ministry ===
In May 1953, she met her husband, Joe Richards. Together they served as missionaries in Honbetsu and Sapporo, Japan from 1954 to 1966. They also were co-pastors of an Ohio Presbyterian church for two years while attending graduate school. In 1968, Joe accepted Lombard Mennonite Church's invitation to come and serve as pastor.

=== Later years ===
Emma and her husband left Lombard in 1991 to become interim ministers for the Illinois Mennonite Conference. They retired in 1996.

== Ordination ==
The road that led to Emma Richard's ordination began during the summer of 1971. Her husband, E. Joe Richards was the current pastor at Lombard Mennonite Church in Illinois. Both of them worked in the school system. When Joe was promoted to principal of Arbor View Elementary School, he started to consider resigning from his pastoral position. LMC members, Don and Elda Kreider, visited the Richards and during their visit, Joe remarked that Emma's assistance would allow him to retain his position at LMC. The Kreiders organized a petition to the church council to request that the ordination of Emma Richard be pursued. There were eleven signatures on the document when it was presented to the council on September 9, 1971 and the average age of the signers was over sixty years.

The Church council proposed that Joe and Emma serve as a pastoral team to the church body at a congregational meeting on November 7, 1971. It unanimously passed. The proposal for ordination was then sent to the Illinois Mennonite Conference. During a discernment meeting at the conference, the church representatives were asked if this proposal was motivated by the fact that Lombard would become the first Mennonite Church to ordain a woman as pastor. Lombard was already the first church in their conference to use an organ regularly, have a permanent choir, and to have most females attend worship without a covering.

During the spring of 1972, conference's leadership commission recommended that Emma receive a pastoral licence for a period of time before ordination be re-examined. They expressed that Emma's call to ministry, education, and experience were not being questioned, and that the only issue being addressed was that she was a woman. A committee that included men and women was formed to address the issue, and eventually recommended the ordination of Emma Richard to the conference. The district conference approved the motion on April 7, 1973, although it was made clear that this was a specific case, and that this action did not approve of ordination being open to all women. Emma Richard's installation service was held at LMC on October 15, 1972, but she was not officially ordained by the conference until June 17, 1973.

== Legacy ==
Emma Richards was invited to preach during Sunday morning service at the Mennonite World Conference in Strasbourg, France, in 1984.

A woman has to work twice as hard to prove herself - be a better student, be a better preacher and manage an effective household. - Emma Richards

Ann Allebach was actually the first Mennonite woman to be ordained. She was ordained by the General Conference Mennonite Church in Philadelphia on January 15, 1911. However, she was never installed as a pastor of a Mennonite congregation. There were no other women ordained between Ann Allebach and Emma Richards.

The Illinois Mennonite Conference opened ordination to all women on April 2, 1982.

The personal papers of Emma Richards are housed at the Mennonite Church USA Archives.

In 2013 a book about Emma Richards titled According to the Grace Given to Her was released by the Institute of Mennonites Studies at Anabaptist Mennonite Biblical Seminary. The book has three editors, James E. Horsch, John D. Rempel, and Eldon D. Nafziger, and nearly twenty contributors.
