= Assembly Mennonite Church =

Assembly Mennonite Church is a Mennonite Church located in Goshen, Indiana. It is a member of the Central District Conference of Mennonite Church USA. Beginning as a small group of Members from Surrounding Mennonite Churches, Assembly broke from that congregation in the mid-1970s.

== History ==
=== College Mennonite Church ===
College Mennonite Church (CMC) is so named because it was begun in conjunction with the creation of Goshen College in 1903. In 1904, the charter members fought to be organized as a union congregation; a church with membership in both Mennonite and Amish Mennonite conferences.

The first Sunday school was organized at CMC in 1904, the first missionaries commissioned in late 1904 and 1905, and soon after began to support "home missions" in Chicago and Fort Wayne, Indiana. By 1909, College Mennonite had begun a Working Girls Missionary Society and a sewing circle and CMC, along with Goshen College students' Young People's Christian Association, helped begin the Sunday schools that became North Goshen Mennonite Church and East Goshen Mennonite Church.

In 1923, Goshen College closed for a year due to conflicts over Mennonite acculturation, conflicts that carried over into the ranks of CMC. Many members left and joined Eighth Street Mennonite Church, then a part of the General Conference Mennonite Church. Of the 213 members in 1923, only between 15 and 30 remained in the fall of 1924, though accounts differ.

=== New Directions ===
When College Mennonite Church chose to build a new building on campus, the members felt they were making a statement about commitment to the college and the students, but almost immediately, in the 1960s, some students at Goshen College began asking for an alternative "campus church." Beginning with an alternative Sunday school class, one of several College Church "K-groups" ("K" stands for "Koinonia," Greek for "fellowship") called "Metanoia" (Greek for "repentance") began exploring new models for church. Ultimately this K-group, Metanoia, separated from the main CMC congregation in mid-1974 and began a new congregation, "the Assembly," which organized itself as a conglomeration of intimate, smaller communities. The two congregations continued to collaborate on children's Sunday school for a time and had a combined youth group until 1986.

=== Assembly Mennonite Church ===
In 1978, the church purchased a vacant factory building on 11th street, once used to manufacture cheerleading uniforms, which was renovated by church members and added onto in the 1990s. An additional renovation was done in 2020.

In 1996 the church hired its first (part-time) pastor. In the late 1990s the staff increased in size to a pastoral team of three, each serving one-third time positions. The congregation has continued to value the model of a pastoral team, rather than a solo pastor.

== Today ==
Weekly attendance ranges from 190 to 240 at Assembly, with 175 members participating in 20 small groups that meet 2-4 times each month.

Assembly had over 1,000 members in its first 30 years.

The Assembly congregation shares its building with Faith Mennonite Church.

The church has a liturgical dance group.

Rather than employing an individual to construct a narrative history of the congregation, Assembly invited certain members to write more thematically focused historical reflections, available on their website.

Some of Assembly Mennonite Church's institutional records are housed at the Mennonite Church USA Archives.

=== Cooperative efforts ===
With Faith Mennonite Church and Walnut Hill Mennonite Church, Assembly assisted the Goshen Interfaith Hospitality Network.

Assembly has collaborated in a Vacation Bible School each summer with College Mennonite Church, Faith Mennonite Church, Eighth Street Mennonite Church, and Iglesia Menonita Del Buen Pastor. Assembly and Buen Pastor also had an annual joint service and soccer game.
