= Lucy Winchester =

Lucy Winchester may refer to:

- Lucy Winchester (novel), a 1945 novel by Christmas Carol Kauffman
- Lucy Winchester (secretary) (1937–2025), Kentucky socialite and White House Social Secretary
