= John S. Coffman =

John S. Coffman (October 16, 1848 – July 22, 1899) was a leader in the Mennonite Church in the late 19th century. He promoted evangelical and progressive reform through his positions in the Mennonite Publishing Company, revival meetings, and as chairman of the Elkhart Institute (a forerunner to Goshen College).

== Early life ==
John S. Coffman was born on October 16, 1848, in Rockingham County, Virginia. His parents were Samuel and Frances Weaver Coffman. He was baptized at age 16 and soon fled to Cumberland County, Pennsylvania, to avoid being drafted into the Confederate Army.

On November 11, 1869, he married Elizabeth J. Heatwole. Over the course of their marriage, they had seven children. One of their children, Samuel F. Coffman, was a significant church leader in his own right. They purchased a 30-acre farm on Gravelly Hill. Having returned to Virginia, he obtained a teaching certificate despite limited formal education and taught at several local schools. He was chosen by lot and ordained at Bank Church, a Mennonite Congregation in Virginia. He also led singing schools in the area.

== Publishing ==
Coffman was invited by John F. Funk to move to Elkhart, Indiana, where he took the position of assistant editor of the Herald of Truth in 1879. The two men shared a belief in progressive ideals and evangelism. Coffman contributed articles and editorials for that publication as well as Sunday school materials beginning in 1880. Coffman and John F. Funk collaborated on several publications such as the Minister's Manual and Confession of Faith. Coffman also served as editor and president of the Mennonite Book and Tract Society following its inception in 1889.

== Evangelism ==
Coffman was distressed by the number of young people who left the church due to a lack of spiritual encouragement and guidance. He held his first evangelistic meeting series in June 1881 in Kent County, Michigan. His forceful speaking allowed him to hold similar events in Mennonite Communities across the United States and Canada. He also promoted missionary activity.

== Higher education ==
Excerpt from "The Spirit of Progress", 1896

Had the [Mennonite] church... cultivated the spirit of learning which her people originally possessed we might be a people famed for learning; and our congregations might number thousands where now count only hundreds.

We [in Mennonite education] should permit nothing to prevent us from maintaining the high standard of Christian life that has been defended by the teachings of out Mennonite people through their whole history.

-J.S. Coffman

Coffman was among the first Mennonite leaders to feel the need for Mennonite institutions for higher learning, especially according to the ideals of a liberal arts education. In 1895, he campaigned to sell stock in the Elkhart Institute of Science, Industry, and the Arts (now Goshen College), which had been founded by Dr. Henry A Mumaw a year earlier, and even more recently incorporated under the Elkhart Institute Association.

On February 11, 1896, at the opening ceremonies of the new building (erected across the street from Prairie Street Mennonite Church), Coffman gave the address, "The Spirit of Progress." In April that year, when the board reconvened, they voted Coffman to be president. He served in this position until his resignation on April 29, 1899.

== Death and legacy ==
Coffman died at home at the age of 51 on July 22, 1899. The cause of death was a malignant growth in his stomach, from which he had suffered for a number of years. Funeral services were held in both Elkhart and Virginia. He was buried at Prairie Street Cemetery.

Coffman Hall is a building on Goshen College campus, which was named in his honor.

Coffman's personal papers are housed in the Mennonite Church USA Archives.
