= Oak Grove Mennonite Church =

Historical church in Ohio

Coordinates: 40°51′31″N 81°49′55″W

Located in Smithville, Ohio, Oak Grove Mennonite Church is an historical church that has made a significant contribution to the larger Mennonite denomination, currently pastored by Seth Miller. Oak Grove started as an Amish church in 1818, as many Amish started settling in Wayne County, Ohio. From humble beginnings the church grew and built a meetinghouse in 1862, one of the earliest of such meetinghouses the Amish have built.

A notable leader of the Amish church at this time was bishop John K. Yoder, who led the church from 1855–1906. Bishop Yoder's main contribution to Oak Grove was his progressive attitude toward Amish doctrine. In 1862, John K. Yoder moderated the first meeting of the Diener Versammlungen. Diener Versammlungen, from 1862–1878 were denominational meetings in which Amish ministers met to discuss changes in the Ordnung. The very idea of a churchwide meeting for Amish was revolutionary; however, once the meetings started, it became clear that the majority of the leaders there were more change-minded than interested in keeping with tradition. Thus, conservative opposition was given a chance to speak, and the opposition gave the leaders a clear ultimatum. After 1863, many of the conservative ministers removed themselves from the meeting, and as such, John K. Yoder led toward progress, forming an "orphan congregation" which became Amish-Mennonite. With John K. Yoder as Oak Grove's bishop, it was seen as the leading congregation in which as many as 5,000 Ohio Amish became known as Amish Mennonites. After several decades of relative obscurity, Amish-Mennonites later dropped Amish from their name and joined "Old" Mennonites in the Ohio Conference of the Mennonite Church. Theologian John Howard Yoder is from this church.

Lead Pastors:

- Christian Brandt: 1818–1866
- David Zook: unknown
- Peter Schrock: unknown–1846
- Solomon Zook: unknown–1870
- Peter Nafziger: unknown–1841
- John Fertenwald: 1831–1849
- Joseph Frey: unknown
- Hannes Yoder: unknown–1850
- Emmanuel Hochstetler: 1855–1862
- Jacob Yoder: 1850–1858
- Peter Blough: 1855–unknown
- Christian Nafziger: 1844–1864
- Christian Schantz: unknown
- John K. Yoder: 1855–1906
- Christian Conrad: 1859–1890
- Christian K. Yoder: 1861–1871
- Jonathon Smucker: 1861–1887
- John Smiley: 1866–1878
- D.Z. Yoder: 1872–1929
- David Hostetler: 1880–1889
- Isaac Miller: 1891–1894
- Benjamin Gerig: 1895–1913
- J.S. Gerig: 1896–1925
- C.Z. Yoder: 1904–1930s John K. Yoder's son, John Smiley his father-in-law
- Peter R. Lantz: 1909–1927 Elkhart Institute
- Jesse N. Smucker:1931–1936 Princeton Seminary for one year, Hartford Theological Seminary
- William G. Detweiler: 1938–1947 Temple University. Started Mennonite radio show The Calvary Hour. First pastor of Smithville Mennonite
- Virgil O. Gerig: 1947–1960 College of Wooster, economics, Oberlin Graduate School of Theology, Michigan State, Harvard Divinity School, Princeton Theological Seminary
- Robert Otto: 1960–1965 Goshen College, Goshen Biblical Seminary
- Lotus Troyer: 1965–1971 Goshen College
- Peter Wiebe: 1972–1984 Goshen College and Goshen Biblical Seminary
- Jim Schrag: 1985–1994 Bethel College KS, Associated Mennonite Biblical Seminary
- Dennis Schmidt: 1994–1996
- Norma Duerkson: 1993–2008 Bethel College KS, Associated Mennonite Biblical Seminary
- Will Shertzer: 2008–2009 Interim pastor
- Doug Zehr: 2009–2024
- Seth Miller: 2024-present

== See also ==
- Alexanderwohl Mennonite Church
- Howard-Miami Mennonite Church
