= Mennonite Mission Church (Hannibal, Missouri) =

Coordinates: 39.7031°N 91.3705°W

The Mennonite Mission Church (formerly Mennonite Gospel Mission) was a Mennonite church located in Hannibal, Missouri, part of the South Central Conference of the (old) Mennonite Church denomination.

== History ==
=== Founding ===
In June 1936 the first church presence was organized by Nelson E. Kauffman and Christmas Carol Kauffman, who had been sent as mission workers by the Mennonite General Mission Board. The church's first meetings took place inside a converted barbershop. In 1936, a church building was built at 1530 Lyon Street in Hannibal. Nelson E. Kauffman served as the church's minister at the church's founding in August 1934, until he was appointed a bishop in September 1940. In 1940 Harold Kreider took up ministry responsibilities, and in 1956 as Kauffman left Hannibal, Kreider became the church's pastor.

=== Mission outreach ===
Some of the church's community involvements begun by Nelson and Christmas Carol Kauffman included a homeless ministry, a small care facility for the elderly started in 1957 (see Legacy), and a radio program operated by Nelson Kauffman. In 1956, membership of the church was 77.

==== Johnnie Allison ====
Another outreach was a prison ministry program in cooperation with nearby Palmyra Mennonite Church, a program which resulted in the notable relationship between the Kauffmans, the church's founders, and a convicted murderer, Johnnie Allison. Allison was converted and baptized by Nelson Kauffman in July 1951, and would eventually found a small Mennonite church within the Missouri State Penitentiary. As a result of his conversion and connection with Nelson E. Kauffman, Allison refused to cooperate with legal counsel during his murder trial, insisting, "I do not need a lawyer, God is my attorney." Christmas Carol Kauffman documented his conversion story in a short text entitled Life With Life, and Allison even went on to write pieces for the Gospel Herald at the request of Kauffman.

== Legacy ==
The retirement facility founded by the church in 1957 in Hannibal has grown into the Beth Haven Retirement Community, which remains as a "faith-based, local, not-for-profit corporation."

Correspondence and records kept by Nelson E. Kauffman relating to the church's growth and mission programs are housed at the Mennonite Church USA Archives.
