= WMSC =

WMSC may refer to:

- WMSC (FM), a college radio station located in Upper Montclair, New Jersey, United States
- FIA World Motor Sport Council
- William Morris Society of Canada
- Women's Missionary and Service Commission, a women's organization that originated out of the Mennonite Sewing Circle movement
- Wrigley Marine Science Center, part of the USC Wrigley Institute for Environmental Studies
