= Nelson E. Kauffman =

Nelson Edward Kauffman (October 5, 1904 – June 18, 1984) was an American religious leader who served as a bishop and pastor of the (old) Mennonite Church. He served as secretary for home missions for the Mennonite Board of Missions and Charities from 1955–1970, as president of the Mennonite Board of Education from 1950–1970, and from 1934–1956 worked with his wife, Christmas Carol Kauffman, as a missionary in Hannibal, Missouri. He is father of James Kauffman.

== Biography ==
Nelson Edward Kauffman was born on October 5, 1904, in Garden City, Missouri, to David Gideon Kauffman and Mary E. King. When he was 10 years old, Kauffman's family moved to Minot, North Dakota and began operating a dairy farm there. After gaining an interest in mission work, Kauffman pursued higher education by enrolling at Hesston College. At Hesston, he met Christmas Carol Kauffman, and the two were married on June 10, 1929. After 22 years of mission work in Hannibal, Missouri, Nelson and Christmas Carol moved to Christmas Carol's home, Elkhart, Indiana, and attended Prairie Street Mennonite Church. While in Elkhart, Christmas Carol died of Hepatitis in 1969. In 1970, Nelson married Lois Garber Keener, and several years later the two moved to Largo, Florida, where Nelson died of a heart attack on June 18, 1981.

=== Hannibal mission work ===
In Spring, 1934, Nelson and his wife Christmas Carol Kauffman accepted a call from the Mennonite General Missions Board to begin a mission church in Hannibal, Missouri, where they founded a Mennonite Mission Church under the South Central Mennonite Conference. Nelson and Christmas Carol would remain in Hannibal for 22 years, working with several mission projects attached to the Gospel Mission, including significant work in prison ministry. Nelson held a radio broadcast, "Christ for Today," and, after several local revival meetings, was asked to do tours of revival meetings across the country. Nelson was also appointed as a bishop for the Gospel Mission and several other congregations in 1940.

=== Church involvement and legacy ===
In 1950, while still working in Hannibal, Kauffman began serving as a vice president of the Mennonite Board of Education, and remained involved in its administration as president or vice president until 1970. During these years he was involved in the creation of Associated Mennonite Biblical Seminary as well as the Conrad Grebel Projects Committee, which worked to make college resources available to those outside of the typical college age range. In 1955, Kauffman was appointed secretary for home missions for the Mennonite Board of Missions and Charities, prompting his and Christmas Carol's move from Hannibal to Elkhart, Indiana. He also served on this position until 1970.

Nelson Kauffman's personal papers are housed in the Mennonite Church USA Archives.
