= Threshing stone =

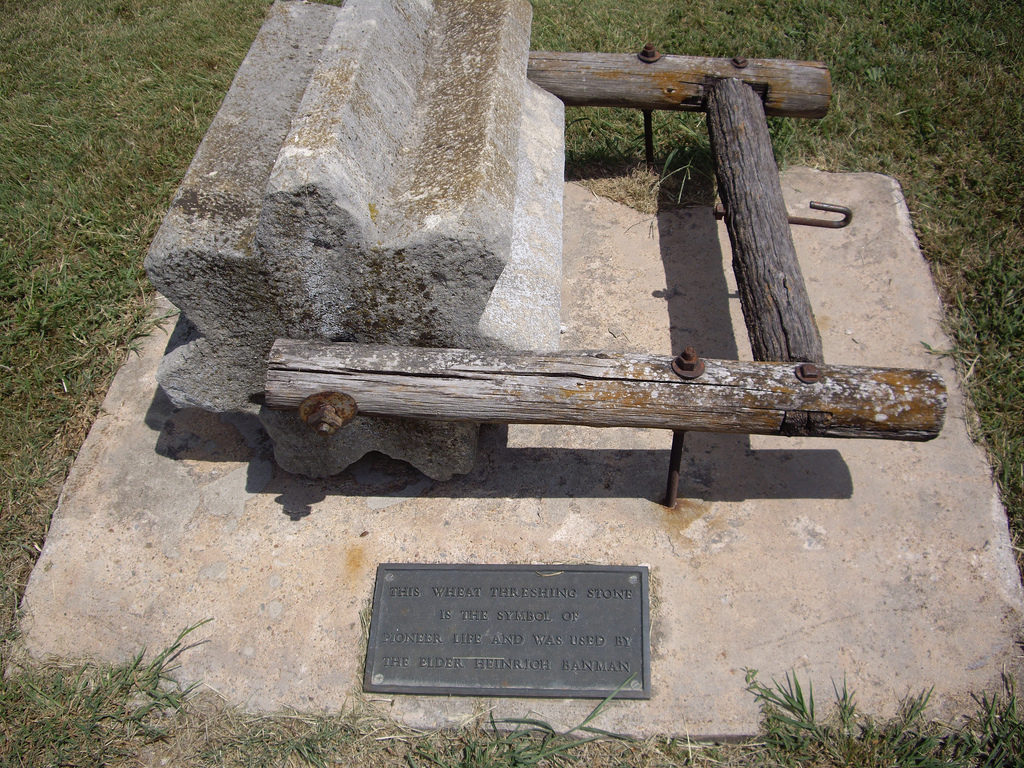
Threshing stone near Goessel, Kansas at Alexanderwohl Mennonite Church (2010)

A threshing stone is a roller-like tool used for the threshing of wheat. Similar to the use of threshing boards, the stone was pulled by horses over a circular pile of harvested wheat on a hardened dirt surface (threshing floor), and the rolling stone knocked the grain from the head of wheat. The straw was removed from the pile and the remaining grain and chaff was collected. By a process called winnowing, the grain was tossed into the air to allow the chaff and dirt to be blown away, leaving only the grain.

== History ==
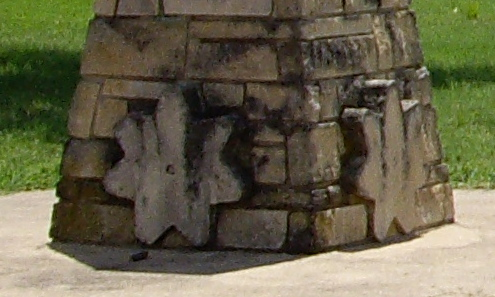
Cross sections of a threshing stone on a monument in Peabody, Kansas (2010)

Evidence of the use of threshing stones in various forms date from the Roman era, but eventually it became the method of threshing grain by the Molotschna Mennonite farmers in Ukraine from about 1840 to 1900. The threshing stone became the preferred method used to knock the grain from the head because it was less labor-intensive than the use of the traditional threshing flail.

In the 1870s, approximately one-third of all Russian Mennonites immigrated to the Great Plains of North America. The immigrants in central Kansas brought the threshing stone technology with them, and contracted stone masons in the Florence, Kansas, area to construct stones made of limestone.

The use of threshing stones quickly faded as they were superseded by mechanized forms of threshing, especially by threshing machines, and eventually all farmers quit using them by around 1900 to 1905.

== Physical description ==
The threshing stone is a cylindrical stone with teeth carved into it. Stones made in Kansas were approximately 29 to 30 inches long, 23 to 24 inches in diameter, with 7 notches (and rarely 8) resembling gear teeth, made of limestone, and 600 to 800 pounds in weight. Some smaller stones may weigh less than 400 pounds.

== Locations ==
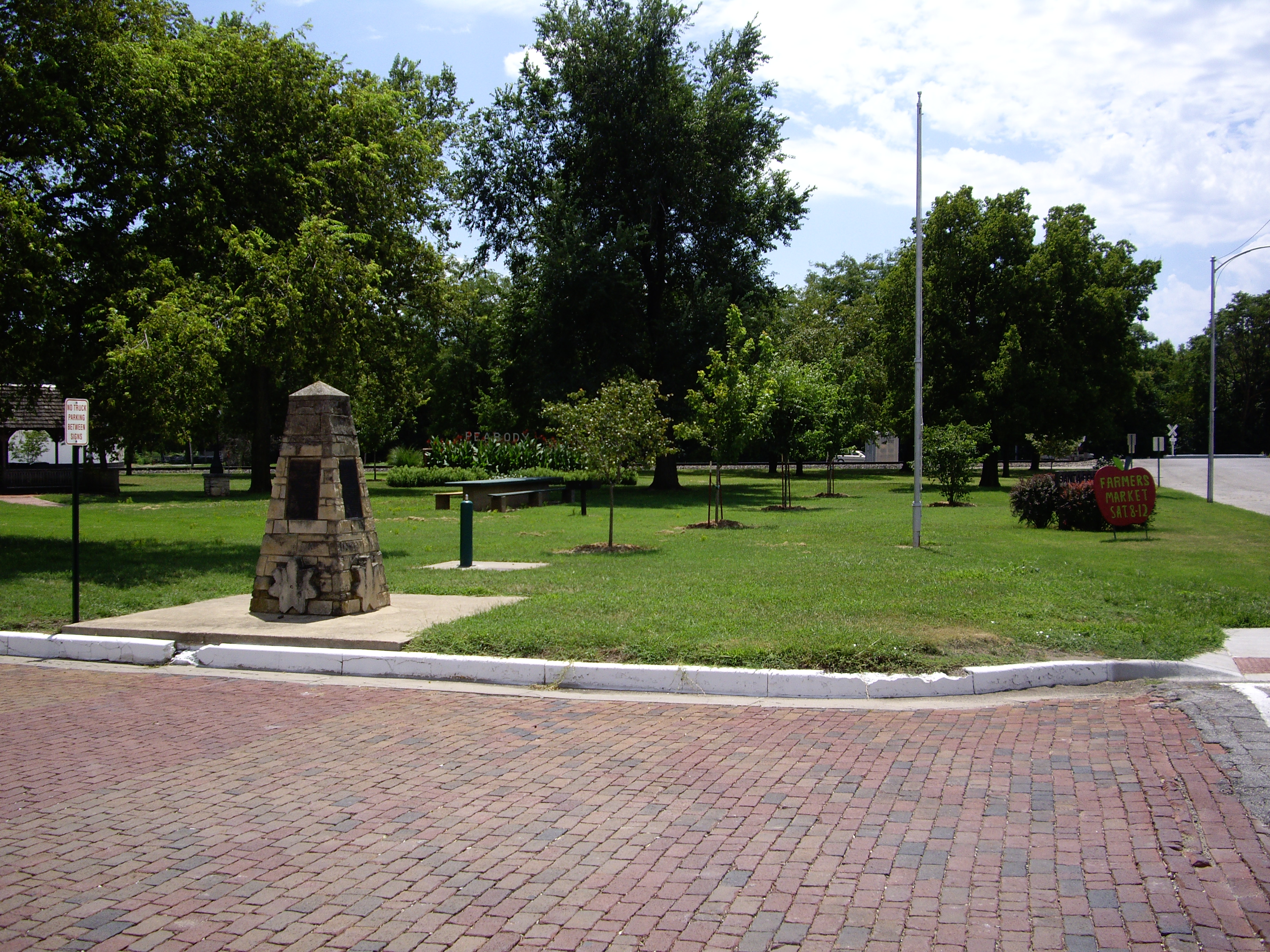
1974 Mennonite Centennial Memorial Monument in Santa Fe Park of Peabody, Kansas. A threshing stone was cut and placed on 4 sides of this monument. (2010)

In 2011, over 90 threshing stones have been located. Numerous stones in Kansas are located at private residences as family historic artifacts. The following is a list of locations where threshing stones may be viewed by the public.

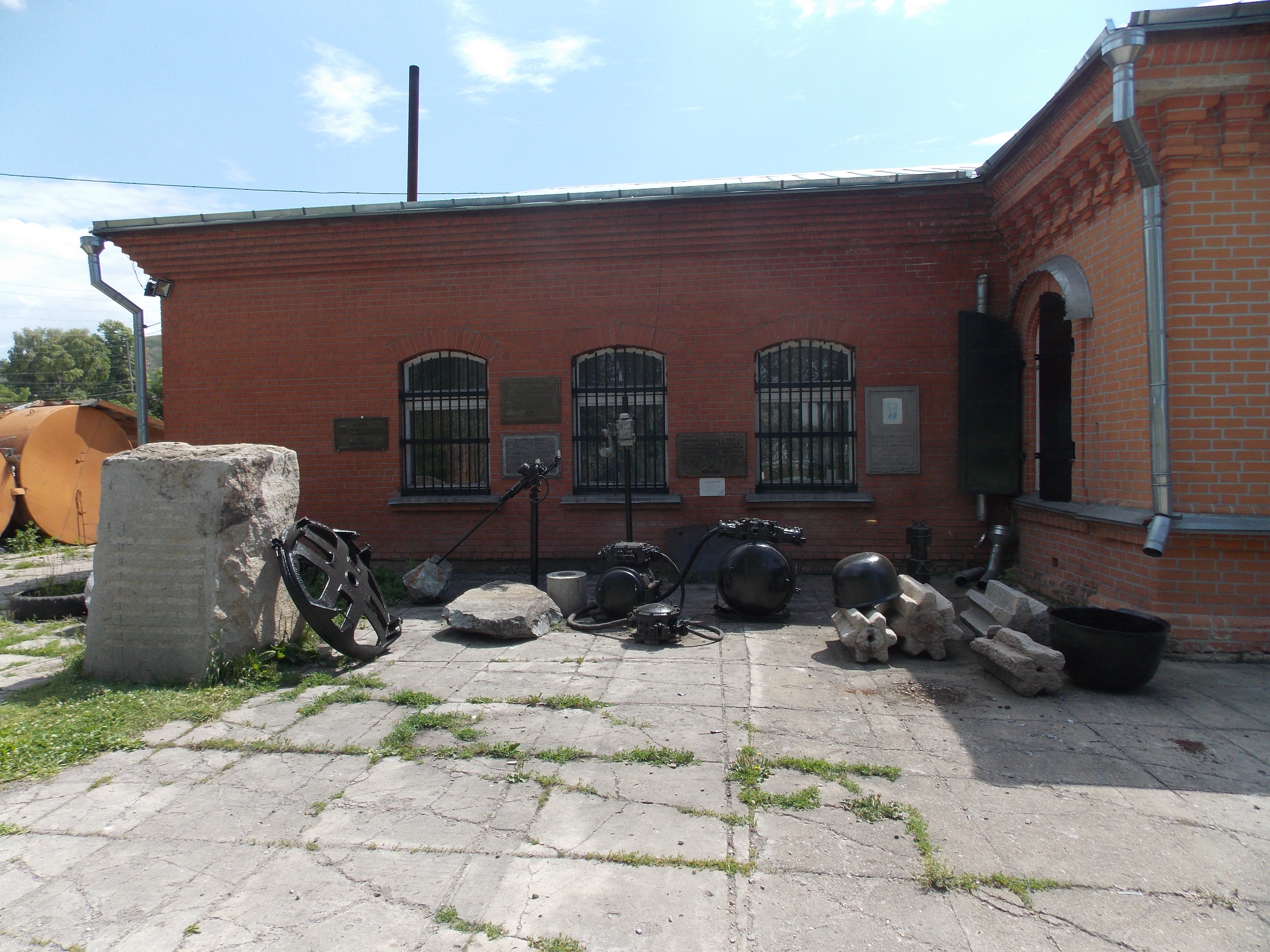
Part of the exhibition at Zmeinogorsk Museum of Mining (in Russia), including four threshing stones at the right

Museums:

- 4 at Zmeinogorsk Museum of Mining in Zmeinogorsk (Russia).
- 3 at Mennonite Heritage and Agricultural Museum in Goessel, Kansas.
- 3 at Mennonite Settlement Museum in Hillsboro, Kansas.
- 2 at Kauffman Museum at Bethel College in North Newton, Kansas.
- 2 at Inman Museum in Inman, Kansas.
- 2 at Mennonite Heritage Village in Steinbach, Manitoba, Canada.
- 1 at Halstead Heritage Museum in Halstead, Kansas.
- 1 at McPherson Museum in McPherson, Kansas.
- 1 at Kansas Museum of History in Topeka, Kansas.
- 1 at American Historical Society of Germans from Russia in Lincoln, Nebraska.

Various:

- 4 at Buhler High School in Buhler, Kansas.
- 2 at Administration Building and Bookstore at Bethel College in North Newton, Kansas.
- 1 at Alexanderwohl Mennonite Church near Goessel, Kansas.
- 1 in Mennonite Centennial Memorial Monument in Peabody, Kansas.

== Other uses ==
The Thresher is the official mascot of Bethel College in North Newton, Kansas, and named after the threshing stone.
