= Alexanderwohl Mennonite Church =

Coordinates: 38°15′42.7″N 97°20′3.9″W

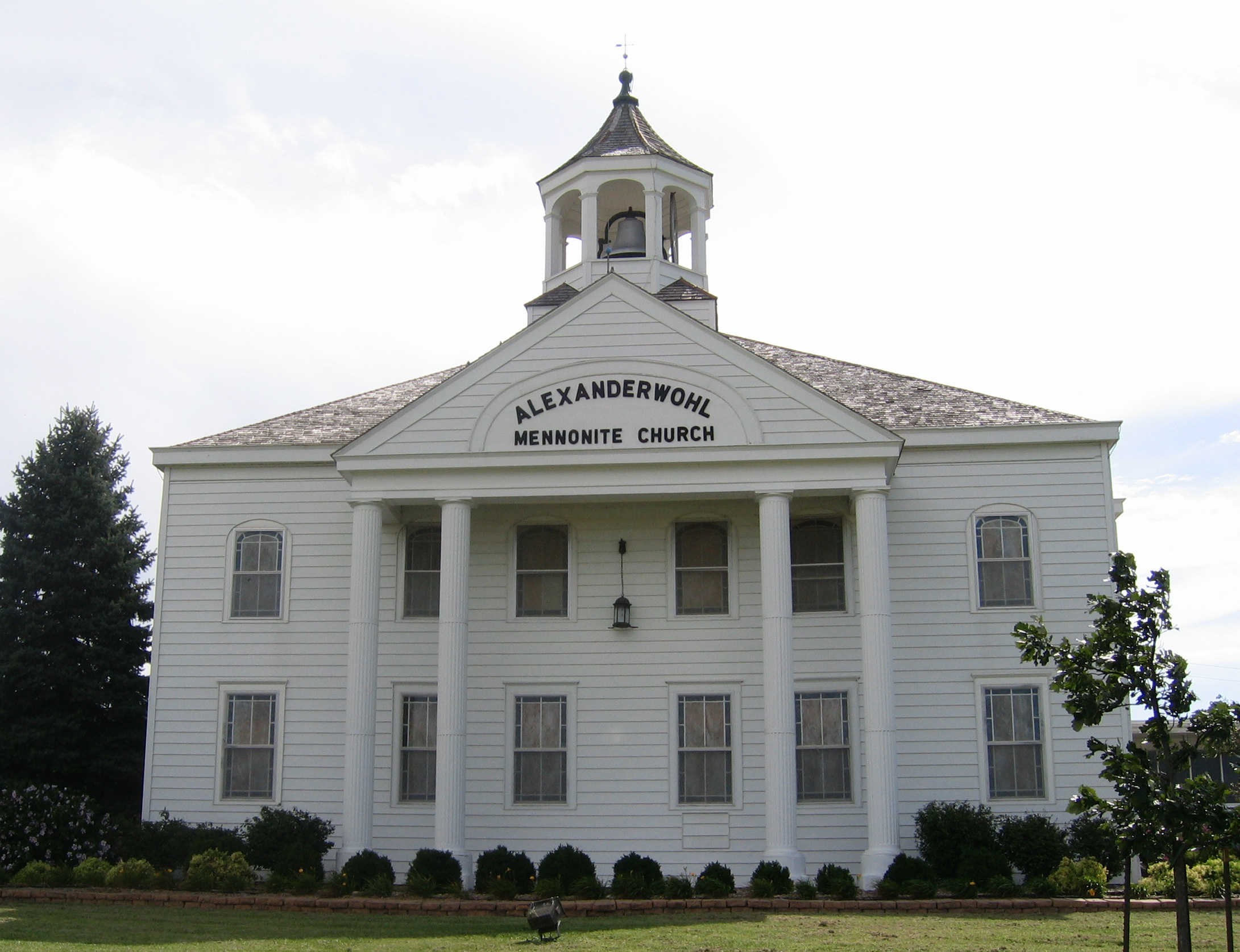
Alexanderwohl Mennonite Church, 2007

The Alexanderwohl Mennonite Church of Goessel, Kansas, is a congregation affiliated with Mennonite Church USA. The congregation has a continuous history dating from 16th-century Europe.

== Background ==
Alexanderwohl Church families trace their roots to the Dutch Anabaptists of the 16th century. From 1600 to 1650, these families, now called Mennonites, migrated to West Prussia, settling in the Danzig area between the Vistula and Nogat Rivers. The Przechówko church in West Prussia, the mother church of Alexanderwohl, was composed of Mennonites who settled near Schwetz and Culm on the Vistula River. Because of growing Prussian militarism and ongoing discrimination against Mennonites, a large portion of the Przechówko Church migrated in 1820-21 under the leadership of Peter Wedel to the Molotschna Mennonite colony in South Russia. In Russia they would be granted exemption from military service, the right to run their own schools and self-govern their villages. During this journey they met Czar Alexander I of Russia, who wished them well (German: "wohl"), prompting the naming of the new village, Alexanderwohl.

== Immigration from Russia to Kansas ==
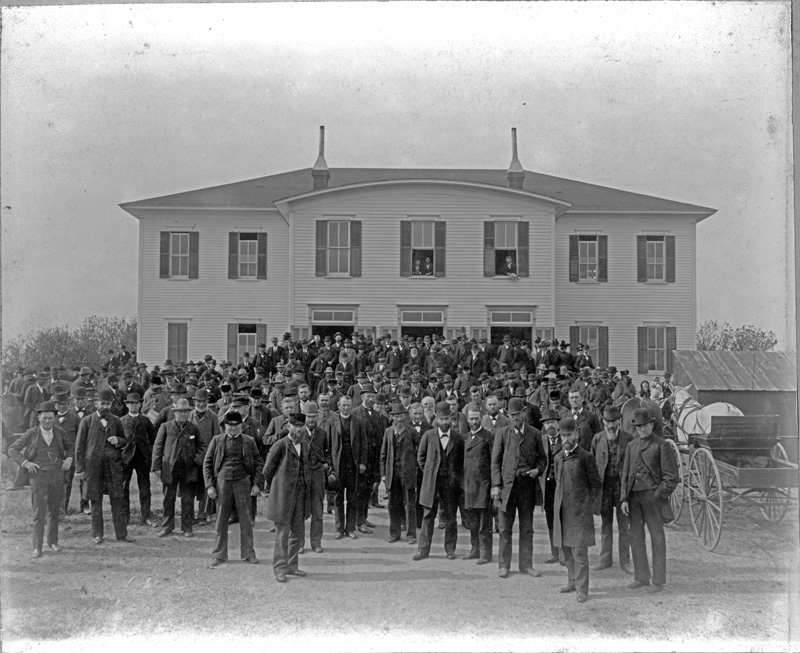
1896 general conference delegates

In 1870, the Russian government issued a proclamation stating the intention to end all special privileges granted to German colonists by 1880. Alarmed at the possibility of losing control of their schools and military exemption, a delegation of Mennonite leaders, including Jacob Buller and Dietrich Gaeddert, ministers of the Alexanderwohl congregation, visited North America in 1873 to investigate resettlement possibilities. The delegates split into separate parties, with Buller and Gaeddert traveling to Kansas. When they returned in September their congregations had already decided they were ready to move to North America. Over the next nine months they prepared for the trip.

In May 1874, Eduard Totleben, representing the czar, visited the Molotschna Mennonite making verbal promises in an attempt to persuade them not to emigrate. Unconvinced, immigration plans proceeded. Disposing of property, they were able to get full price for grain and animals but land and other possessions went for half value or less. Passports were obtained on 15 July 1874 and distributed in the Alexanderwohl Church on the 18th. Travel arrangements were made on the Hamburg-American Line. The entire Alexanderwohl church membership plus other families (about 800 persons) embarked on two ships. Through the leadership and organization skills of Jacob Buller and Dietrich Gaeddert, financial arrangements were made so that even families with the least resources were able make the journey. As a result, this was the only large Mennonite group that migrated from Russia to North America as a complete congregation. Jacob Buller departed with a group on the Cimbria on 12 August 1874 and minister Dietrich Gaeddert led 130 families on the Teutonia which departed on 16 August 1874. The trip from Hamburg, Germany to New York lasted about 18 days and from there they proceeded in three groups to Topeka, Kansas and Nebraska.

Arriving in Topeka on 10 September 1874, the Gaeddert group and the Buller group which arrived soon afterward, were housed by the Santa Fe Railroad for a month while they purchased horses, cattle, farm implements, building materials, food staples and other necessities for starting a new life on the prairie. The two groups had by this time separated from each other, with the Buller group settling near what is now Goessel, Kansas and the Gaeddert group settling east of Buhler, Kansas.

The 15 October 1874 Topeka Commonwealth reported:

One of the largest bona fide land sales ever made in Kansas, perhaps in America, has just been concluded by the Atchison, Topeka and Santa Fe Railroad Company with a community of Russian Mennonites who landed in New York during the month of September, with the steamers Cimbria, Teutonia, and City of Richmond, and most of whom have spent the last thirty days and a good many of their rubles in our city. Their land purchase amounts in round numbers to about 100 thousand acres (400 km²) of railroad land, aside from a number of improved farms, all lying north of the sections of Florence, Peabody, Walton, Newton, Halstead, Burrton, and Hutchinson. ... From the Cottonwood River to the Little Arkansas River ... is now one colony, composed of the thriftiest and most intelligent class of foreigners that ever landed upon our shores; and 'in three years'—to use the language of one of their elders—'that ocean of grass will be transformed into an ocean of waving fields of grain, just as we left our Molotschna colony.' Kansas will be to America what the country of the Black Sea of Azov is now to Europe—her wheat field.

== Hoffnungsau Mennonite Church ==
The Atchison, Topeka and Santa Fe Railway built immigrant houses in Harvey, Marion, McPherson, and Reno counties for the families to stay in while houses were erected on their own land. The Gaeddert group organized a new congregation, Hoffnungsau. Its name was derived from a comment of J. C. Dick who, upon seeing the wide-open prairie that was to be his new home, exclaimed "Dies is ja hier eine wahrhaftige Hoffnungsau" (This is here indeed a true meadow of hope).

== Church building ==
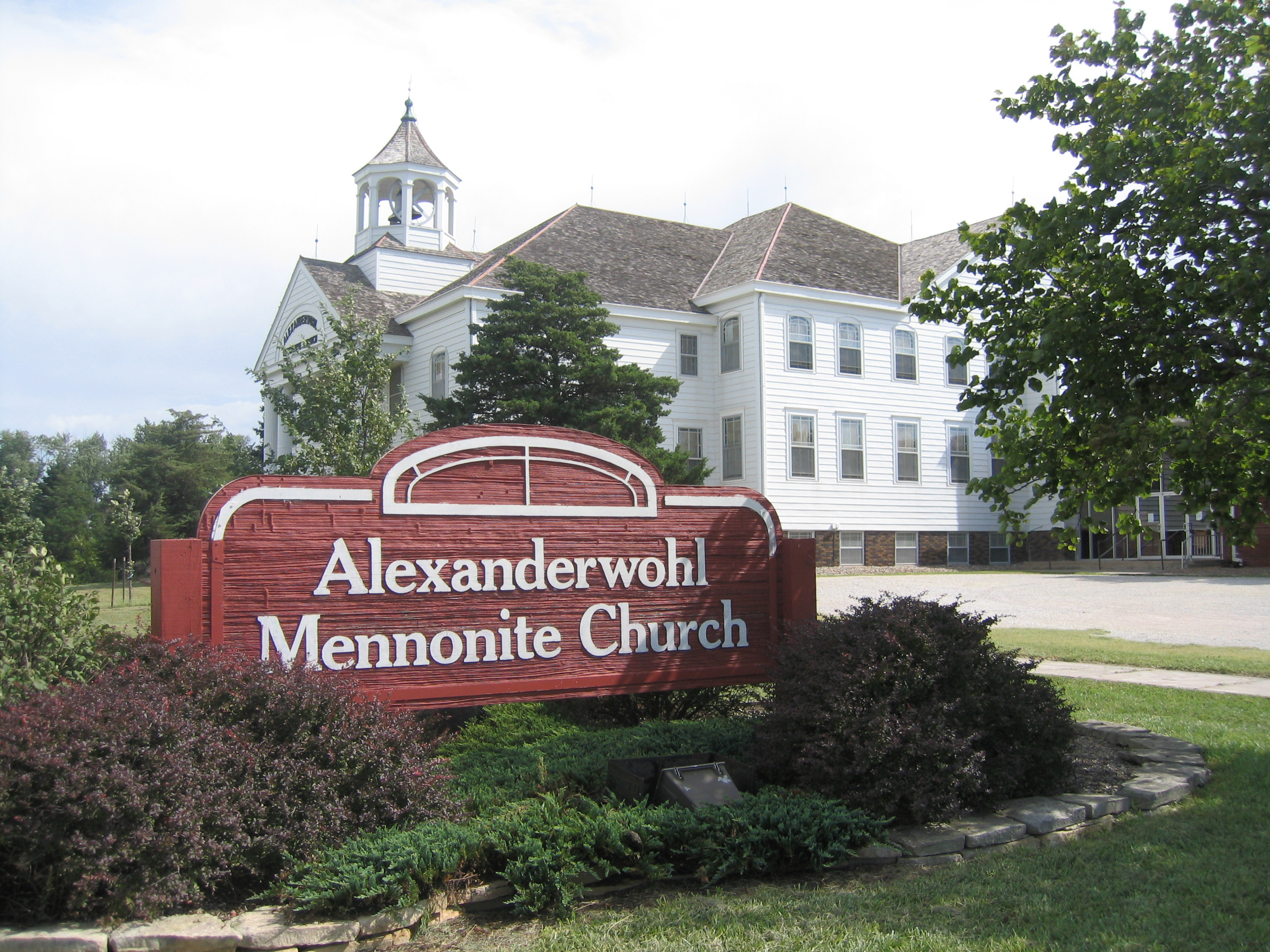
Alexanderwohl Mennonite Church, 2007

Two of the immigrant structures were near the middle of the section on which the Alexanderwohl church now stands. After families moved to newly built homes of their own, the immigrant houses were moved together to form a place of worship. Alexanderwohl church membership grew rapidly from 265 in 1874 to 467 in 1880. Church leaders promoted cooperation with other Mennonites in Kansas for the purpose of creating a teacher training school and doing mission work. Toward this end, the congregation became part of the General Conference Mennonite Church in 1878.

By the winter of 1874 the congregation had opened three schools and more followed. On 13 September 1882 the Emmental Central School for training Mennonite teachers was opened in one of these schools. This school was moved to Halstead, Kansas the next year where it opened as Halstead Seminary and eventually became Bethel College.

In 1886, a new church was completed on the present site. The church building, originally built in the Dutch Mennonite style, underwent a major remodeling project in 1928. An education wing was added in 1961, and a north addition in 1983. Today, Alexanderwohl has approximately 500 members and is affiliated with the Mennonite Church USA and Western District Conference. It has active programs for youth, music, education, community outreach, and missions.

== Landmarks ==
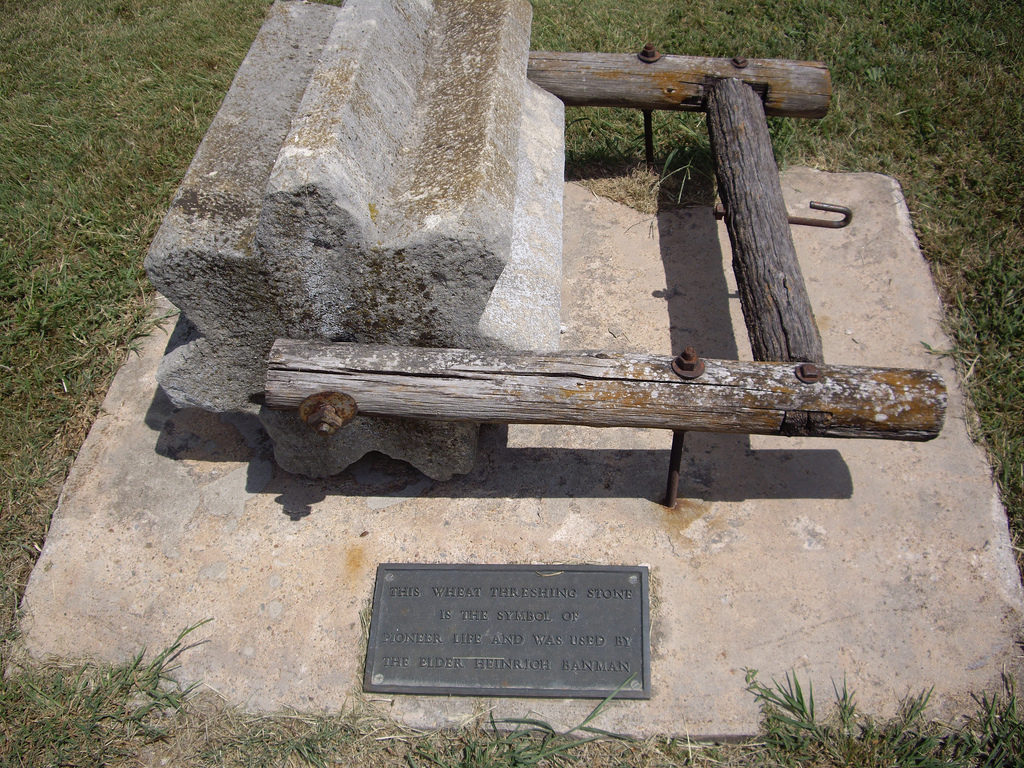
Threshing stone near the church, 2011

These landmarks are located southwest of the church:

- Kansas Historical Marker - The Mennonites In Kansas
- Threshing stone

== See also ==
- Howard-Miami Mennonite Church
- Oak Grove Mennonite Church
- Threshing stone
