= Mennonite Publishing House =

The Mennonite Publishing House was a non-profit publishing operation in Scottdale, Pennsylvania, controlled by the Mennonite Publication Board of the "old" Mennonite Church (1683–2002). It served as the primary publisher of the denomination's periodicals, books, and congregational materials from 1908 to 2002.

== History ==
=== Founding ===
By 1907 several conferences of the (old) Mennonite Church had expressed interest in church ownership and operation of publishing, which had until then been operated privately and separately by publishing houses like the Mennonite Publishing Company, Mennonite Book and Tract Society, and Gospel Witness Company. In 1908, at a meeting of the Mennonite Church General Conference, it was decided to take publication under the control of the church, and the Mennonite Publication Board was created. This board purchased equipment and periodicals from the privately owned publishing houses, and chose to locate its new headquarters in Scottdale, Pennsylvania.

=== Notable publications ===
The Mennonite Publication Board purchased the Herald of Truth from the Mennonite Publishing Company and the Gospel Witness from the Gospel Witness Company and combined these periodicals to form a new official church periodical, the Gospel Herald, which published its first issue on April 4, 1908.

== Legacy ==
The records of the Mennonite Publishing House are located at the Mennonite Church USA Archives.
