= Eighth Street Mennonite Church =

Church in Indiana

Coordinates: 41.579366°N 85.827649°W

Eighth Street Mennonite Church is a Mennonite Church located in Goshen, Indiana. It is a member of the Central District Conference of Mennonite Church USA.

== History ==
Eighth Street was organized by former members of Silver Street Mennonite Church in 1913 and held services in a building on Fifth Street, an avenue which gave the congregation its name until the 1920 construction of a larger building on Eighth Street.

In the 1920s, the Eighth Street congregation expanded as much of the College Mennonite Church joined it in the wake of conflicts within CMC and Goshen College.

In 1956–57, the church building was remodeled and enlarged.

Eighth Street Mennonite was a member of the General Conference Mennonite Church until it merged with the "Old" Mennonite Church to form Mennonite Church USA in 2002.

Early leaders at Eighth Street Mennonite include:

- Jonas S. Hartzler
- I. R. Detweiler
- A. E. Kreider

=== Innovations ===
Eighth Street was one of the Central District Conference congregations involved with the creation of Camp Friedenswald. The congregation was also part of the effort to start Oaklawn mental health facility in Goshen. In 1973, Eighth Street began a preschool program.

== Today ==
In 2011, Eighth Street members donated 600 pounds of vegetables to the local food pantry.

Every summer, Eighth Street joins with Assembly Mennonite Church, College Mennonite Church, Iglesia Del Buen Pastor, and Faith Mennonite Church to organize a Vacation Bible School.
