= Women's Missionary and Service Commission =

The Women's Missionary and Service Commission, previously known as the Women's Missionary and Service Auxiliary and abbreviated WMSC or WMSA, was a women's organization of the "old" Mennonite Church that originated out of the Mennonite Sewing Circle movement. Named the WMSC in 1971, there were many precursor organizations and it has since evolved into Mennonite Women USA, an organization with a much wider scope.

== Mennonite Sewing Circles ==
Mennonite women in Lancaster County, Pennsylvania, were sewing garments for the poor as early as 1895, resulting in the creation of the Paradise Sewing Circle in 1897 through the efforts of Mary A. Mellinger. In 1911, the Associated Sewing Circle was established in Lancaster County. 1900 saw the organization of sewing circles in Science Ridge Mennonite Church in Sterling, Illinois, and at Prairie Street Mennonite Church in Elkhart, Indiana. In the next decade, more sewing circles formed in Illinois, Indiana, Pennsylvania, Minnesota, Ohio, and Ontario.

== Organizational Roots ==
After her husband, Menno Steiner, died in 1911, Clara Eby Steiner began to organize women to promote a general society of sewing circles which came to fruition in 1916 with Mary Burkhard as the first president. From 1922, the general society was named the Mennonite Women's Missionary Society.

In 1928, the Mennonite Board of Missions and Charities created a women's mission committee to operate under it. In the 1933 constitution, the committee took the name The General Sewing Circle Committee of the Mennonite Board of Missions and Charities. This organization and the MWMS co-existed, but eventually most members transitioned to the newer organization, which met annually in connection to the Mennonite Board of Missions and Charities.

The organization was reorganized and renamed the Women's Missionary Sewing Circle Organization in 1947.

== 1955 Annual Meeting ==
At the 1955 Annual Meeting, the name was changed to the Women's Missionary and Service Auxiliary to encompass the greater mission of the organization. Minnie Graber, president, articulated the organization's vision at that time thusly, "We strive toward the vision of concerting the efforts of every Mennonite woman and girl to the total program of the Mennonite Church so that wherever the church is found, in city or country, at home or abroad, in charitable or educational institutions, in community efforts, in relief to the ends of the world, there we may be found enhancing the attractiveness of the Gospel and giving expression to the love of Jesus."

In 1958, the WMSA and its girls' auxiliaries named 826 local units with a total membership of 15,690. That year more than 71,000 garments were received, as well as large quantities of bedding and linens, Christmas bundles, and baby garments.

In 1971 and 1983, the WMSA was reorganized again, after 1971 going under the name the Women's Missionary and Service Commission.

== Legacy ==
In 1997, the WMSC merged with the General Conference Mennonite Church's organization Women in Mission to create Mennonite Women, which, after the division of Mennonite Church USA and Mennonite Church Canada, split to become Mennonite Women USA and Canadian Women in Mission in 2003.

Records of the WMSC are located at the Mennonite Church USA Archives on the campus of Goshen College in Goshen, Indiana.
