= Daniel Brenneman =

American writer (1834–1919)

Daniel Brenneman (June 8, 1834 – September 10, 1919) was an influential Mennonite minister and modernizer of the Mennonite Church (MC), who later founded his own church.

Born in Ohio he was ordained there to the ministry in the Mennonite Church in 1857. He moved to Elkhart County, Indiana, in 1864, where he lived until his death. The first revival meetings known to be held in the Mennonite Church were conducted by him and by John F. Funk in 1872. As a progressive he began to preach in English instead of German. The changes he and Funk introduced in Indiana led to the expulsion of Jacob Wisler and others from the Mennonite church in 1872, who then formed the first of all Old Order Mennonite churches, the Wisler Mennonites, that later adopted the name Ohio-Indiana Mennonite Conference.

With Solomon Eby, Brenneman helped establish the Reforming Mennonite Society which later joined the Mennonite Brethren in Christ church. He compiled a hymnbook, The Balm of Gilead, and 1878 he began publishing the Gospel Banner, the official organ of his new church. Later he edited and published a monthly newsletter titled Youth's Monitor.

He died at his home in Goshen, Indiana, on September 10, 1919.
