= Mennonite Publication Board =

Founded in 1908 in Scottdale, Pennsylvania

The Mennonite Publication Board was founded in 1908 in Scottdale, Pennsylvania, as an organization through which the (old) Mennonite Church could own and operate its own publishing and periodicals. It served as the overseeing board for the printing and sale of denominational texts, operating the Mennonite Publishing House in Scottdale along with several bookstores throughout the United States and Canada, until 2002.

== Founding ==
Prior to 1908, Mennonite publications and periodicals were owned and operated outside of the church, under multiple Mennonite publishing agencies, including the Mennonite Publishing Company, the Mennonite Book and Tract Society and the Gospel Witness Company. Several conferences under the (old) Mennonite Church began expressing a desire to consolidate and control the production of denominational texts, including the Kansas-Nebraska Conference in 1898, with several other conferences expressing interest by 1907. In November 1907 a meeting in Elkhart of delegates from nine conferences voted unanimously that the church should control its publications. A committee was formed with J.S. Shoemaker elected as chairman, and the new committee began negotiating with the three privately operated Mennonite publishing houses, the Mennonite Publishing Company, Gospel Witness Company, and the Mennonite Book and Tract Society, to purchase equipment and publications. Scottdale, Pennsylvania was chosen as the board's headquarters, as well as the location for its printing company, the Mennonite Publishing House. The new Mennonite Publication Board would organize and govern the church's printing interests, while the Mennonite Publishing House would carry out practical operations.

== Function ==
The board operated with an executive committee including a president, vice-president, secretary, and financial agent, although these positions were altered over the years. Notable members of this executive committee include J.C. Wenger, J.S. Shoemaker, Paul Erb, Moses H. Shantz, and A.J. Metzler. Metzler served as a Publishing Agent for the board, the general manager of the board's operations. The board in total had a membership of more than 30 in 1956, the board had a membership of more than 30 and a net worth of $1,019,223.72. Along with the publishing house, it owned several bookstores across the United States and Canada.

In 1956, the board had a membership of more than 30 and a net worth of $1,019,223.72. Along with the publishing house, it owned several bookstores across the United States and Canada

The original charter of the Mennonite Publication Board stated its goal as being "to establish, own and control a church publication house for the publication and dissemination of the literature of the Mennonite churches..." In God Uses Ink, John A. Hostetler notes that although the details of how this goal is carried out changed over the board's life, its general purpose was to create policies that led to the growth of Mennonite publishing.

== Decline ==
In his article for The Mennonite on the decline of Mennonite Publishing House, John Sharp suggests that its difficulties arose partly from a denominational reorganization in 1971 which saw Scottdale, Pennsylvania replaced as a center of influence within the church. Sharp also describes the deep financial difficulties of the church's publishing, brought about by a confusion over whether the Mennonite Publication Board and Mennonite Publishing House should be publishing what was most profitable or what was most beneficial to the church. Construction of a Mennonite Publishing House warehouse in 1978, as well as a reliance for funding on debenture notes paid by persons and congregations within the church, saw the church's publications deeply in debt by the 1980s.

== Restructuring ==
The creation of Mennonite Church USA out of the (old) Mennonite Church and the General Conference Mennonite Church in 2002 saw the Mennonite Publication Board and Mennonite Publishing House replaced by the Mennonite Publishing Network, which represented the broader publishing interests of Mennonite Church USA and Mennonite Church Canada. Due to serious financial issues and debts for both Mennonite Publishing House and the General Conference publishing house, Faith and Life Press, this restructuring eliminated staff from the Mennonite Publishing House and ended their printing operations. By 2003, after taking out loans from several sources in order to pay back debts, all publishing responsibilities were placed under control of the new Mennonite Publishing Network board. In 2006, Mennonite Publishing Network sold the remaining Provident Bookstores it had been operating in order to pay off the last of the debts it had accrued before and during its restructuring. In November 2010, Mennonite Publishing Network relocated to Harrisonburg, Virginia, and merged with Third Way Media, an outreach of the Mennonite Mission Network, to form MennoMedia, which performs print and electronic publishing in a number of formats.
