= Yellow Creek Mennonite Church =

Coordinates: 41.552°N 85.945°W

Yellow Creek Mennonite Church is a Mennonite Church located in Elkhart County, Indiana. It is a member of the LMC, a fellowship of Anabaptist churches.

== History ==
Mennonites settled in Elkhart County, Indiana, beginning in 1839. In 1849 the first Mennonite log meeting house was built near the village of South West, and it was named Yellow Creek after a stream nearby. Bishop Martin Hoover, who moved to Indiana at age 85, died in 1850 and was replaced by Jacob Wisler, ordained bishop in 1851

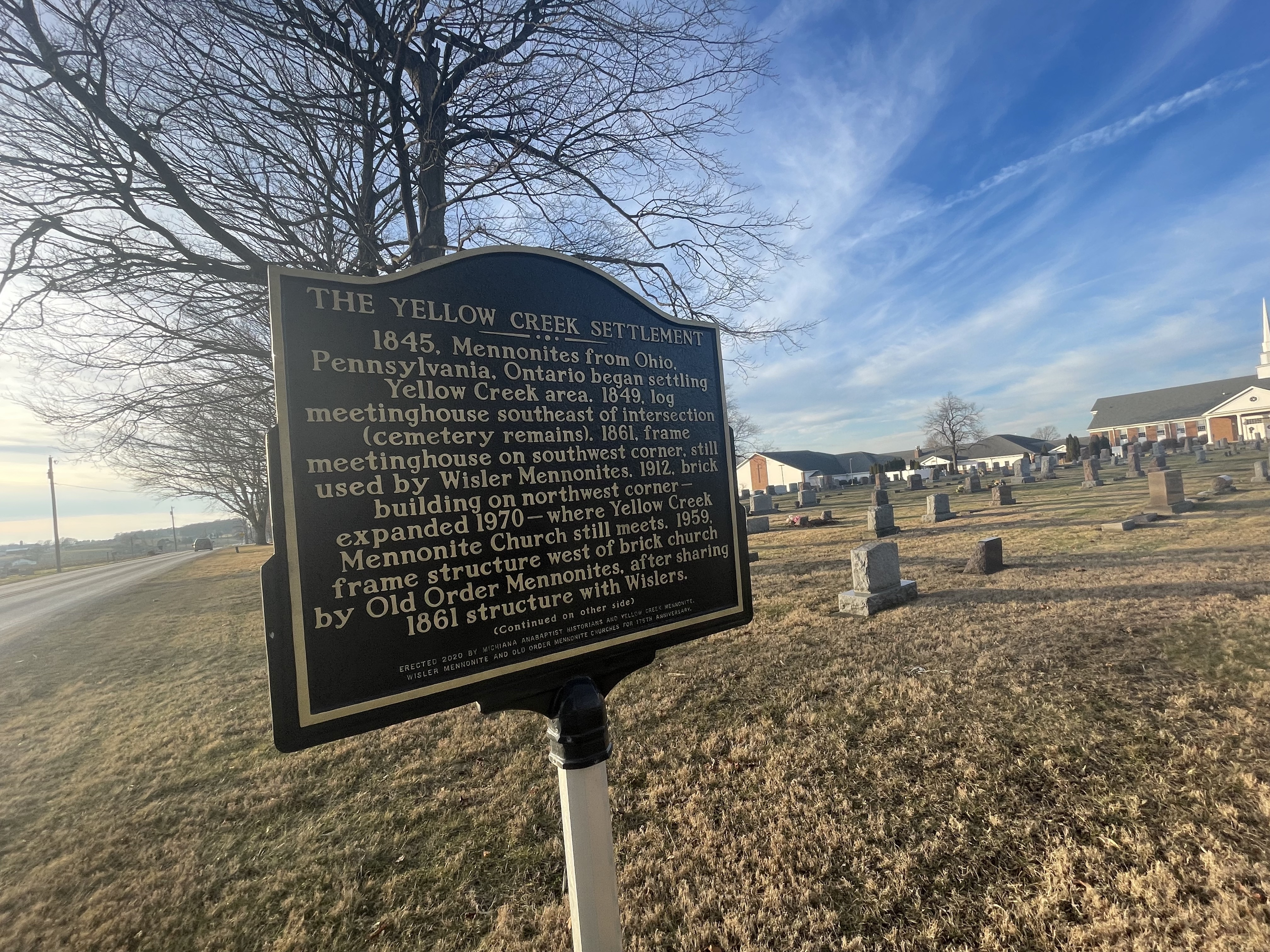
Historic sign at the Yellow Creek Mennonite Church.

In 1861, the congregation required a larger building and built a new structure across the road. Daniel Brenneman, known for his more evangelical theology, and John F. Funk, founder of the Herald of Truth, moved to the Elkhart area in 1864 and 1867 respectively. These two ordained men were known as able preachers and often preached in English, rather than the German language. Because of his skill in English, Brenneman was in great demand in frontier Indiana for funeral services.

Difficulties between the progressive and the conservative preachers, including Jacob Wisler (1808-1889), Daniel Brenneman, John Funk, as well as Joseph Rohrer and Joseph Holdeman, resulted in the expulsion of the conservative preachers, first Rohrer and Holdeman, and then Wisler in 1872. Jacob Wisler was then instrumental in the forming of the Ohio-Indiana Mennonite Conference, also called Wisler Mennonites. About 100 church members sided with Jacob Wisler.

In 1874 Daniel Brenneman was also expelled. John F. Funk was ordained bishop in 1892, serving for a decade until 1902 when church politics forced him to retire from active preaching.

After this division, the Wisler and Funk branches shared the Yellow Creek building, holding services there on alternating Sundays until 1912.
