= Central District Conference =

The Central District Conference is a conference of Mennonite Church USA, made up of 45 congregations located in Indiana, Illinois, Michigan, Ohio, Wisconsin, Georgia, and Virginia, 16 of which are also affiliated with other conferences, including the Indiana-Michigan Mennonite Conference, the Illinois Mennonite Conference, and the Ohio Mennonite Conference. Two congregations are also affiliated with the Church of the Brethren.

== History ==
The Central District Conference belonged to the General Conference Mennonite Church (GC) and was created through a merger of two GC conferences, the Middle District, and the Central Conference, in 1957. It was the second-largest GC conference.

== Today ==
The Central District Conference owns and operates Camp Friedenswald.

The records of both the Central District Conference and its congregations are located at the archives of Bluffton University.
