= Illinois Mennonite Conference =

Illinois Mennonite Conference is an area conference of Mennonite Church USA. There are 100 credentialed leaders active ministers and over 6000 active members. It comprises 42 congregations and church plants, most of which have memberships of between 50 and 100.

== Congregations ==
Some of the largest congregations include the Mennonite Church of Normal, Arthur Mennonite Church, and Lombard Mennonite Church.

Lombard Mennonite Church has about 150 members. It is active in the local Ten Thousand Villages store and other ministries such as Lombard Mennonite Peace Center. The current pastors are Barbara and Richard Gehring, with Nathan Perrin serving as Pastor of Christian Formation. Throughout its history, Mennonites have used this church as a launching point for starting mission churches in the city of Chicago.

== People ==
Emma Richards was ordained as the first female Mennonite minister at Lombard Mennonite Church in 1973. Lombard Mennonite is a member of the Illinois Mennonite Conference.
