= Bethany Christian Schools =

Location
- 2904 South Main Street; Goshen, Indiana 46526; United States; 41°32′44″N 85°49′38″W

Information
- Type: Private Christian
- Established: 1954
- Principal: Lisa Melendez, Juanita Hershberger
- Head of school: Tim Lehman
- Teaching staff: 21.6 (on an FTE basis)
- Grades: K–12
- Enrollment: 326 (2025-2026)
- Student to teacher ratio: 13.2
- Color
- Nickname: Bruins
- Website: www.bethanycs.net

Bethany Christian Schools (BCS) is a private Christian school for grades K–12 in Goshen, Indiana, United States.

== History ==
The Indiana-Michigan Mennonite Conference chartered a high school on June 4, 1953, to be built in Goshen on land that had been "home to a Potawatomi tribe". It opened on September 7, 1954. There were building additions as the school grew, in 1957, 1964, 1989, and 2024.

Bethany Christian was founded to serve Mennonite secondary school students. Following a 24,000 sq. ft. addition to the school in 1990, middle school grades were added in 1996, and grades 4–5 were added in 2011. The school added third grade classes in 2021, and added first and second grades in 2022. They welcomed their first Kindergarten class in 2024 along with a 19,000 sq. ft. addition to add more classrooms, gathering spaces, and mudrooms.

Approximately 80 percent of the school's 350 students in 2018 joined walkouts by students from around the country to protest federal inaction on preventing school shootings. Bethany's protest included song and prayer. Students not participating gathered in the middle school gym.

== Athletics ==
In 2021 extensive sports facility renovations had begun, including new tennis courts, a pavilion, upgraded concessions and restrooms, and a new soccer field, with a field surrounded by a new track, bleachers, press box and scoreboard, as well as new LED lights. Other planned changes include renovations to the baseball field and dugout, the softball field, and a new batting cage, with new landscaping around the entire complex.

In 2007, BCS was barred from hosting sectional championships because of its refusal to play The Star-Spangled Banner at sporting events, as the lyrics are at odds with pacifist ideals of Mennonites. By the 2015 school year, the BCS board decided to play the national anthem at certain sporting events, but it was criticized by some in the community for yielding to considerations of home-field advantage, revenue, and the publicity of hosting championship series, to make the decision. Bethany Christian won its first state championship in 2023 in the 1A Boys soccer state championship.

Bethany Christian won its first state championship in 2023 in the 1A Boys soccer state championship.

The Bethany Christian Bruins are members of the Hoosier Plains Conference. School colors are royal blue and white. The following Indiana High School Athletic Association (IHSAA) sanctioned sports are offered:

- Baseball (boys)
- Basketball (girls and boys)
- Cross country (girls and boys)
- Golf (boys)
- Soccer (girls and boys)
- Softball (girls)
- Tennis (girls and boys)
- Track and field (girls and boys)
- Volleyball (girls)

== Awards ==
- BCS received Elkhart County's 2006 Urban Conservation Award for its wetland study site, which transformed a retention pond into "a diversified wetland and a research site for students".
- In 2017, Bethany Christian Schools received the U.S. Department of Education's Green Ribbon Schools Award, one of two schools in Indiana and 63 schools nationwide to be commended for excellence "in the areas of reducing environmental impact and costs, improving the health and wellness of schools, students, and staff, and providing an environmental education, incorporating Science, Technology, Engineering, and Math (STEM), civic skills, and green career pathways".
- The Indiana Department of Education recognized Bethany Christian Schools among 70 schools statewide for student success on Advanced Placement exams in 2018.
- Bethany Christian Schools was one of sixteen (16) schools recognized as a Blue Ribbon School at the 2026 Indiana Educational Excellence Awards Gala presented by the Indiana Department of Education. State Rep. Joanna King (R-Middlebury) who presented the award, stated it was given for Bethany's overall academic excellence and fostering an environment of learning and growth for all of its students, helping them to reach their full potential. She also presented them with the Heart of Hoosier Award.
