= Ann Allebach =

American Mennonite pastor (1874–1918)

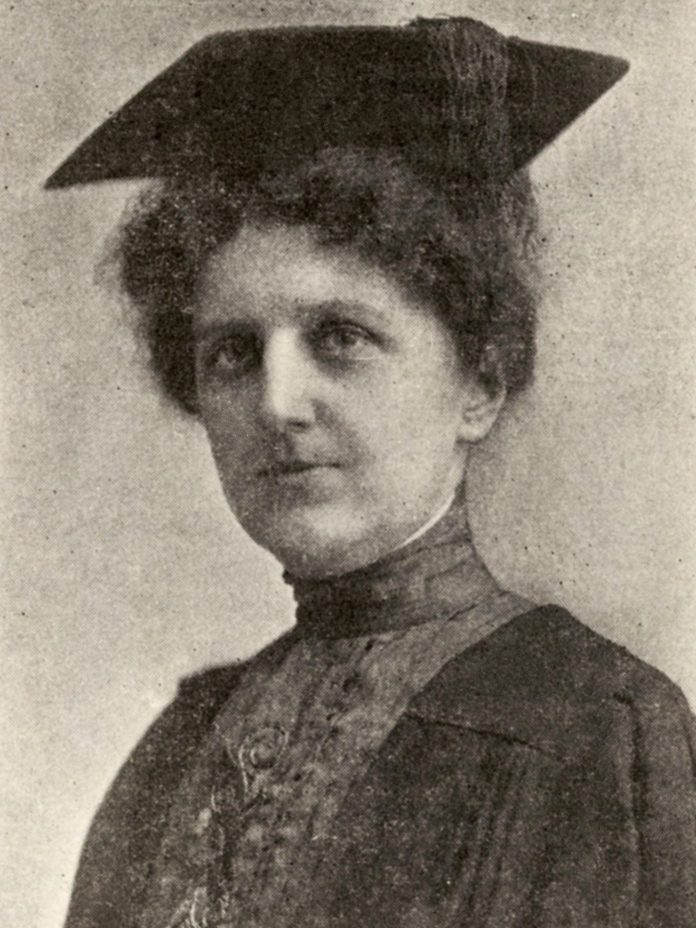
- Allebach, c. 1916
- Born: Ann Jemima Allebach; May 8, 1874; Montgomery County, Pennsylvania
- Died: April 27, 1918 (aged 43); New York City
- Occupation: Mennonite minister
- Political party: Progressive Party

Ann Jemima Allebach (May 8, 1874 – April 27, 1918) was an American minister, educator and suffragette. She was the first woman ordained as a Mennonite minister in North America, on January 15, 1911. There was not another Mennonite woman ordained until 1973.

Allebach was the first woman ever chosen from Kings County, New York, to be a delegate to a national political convention. She was chosen for the 1912 Republican National Convention held in Chicago but was not allowed to attend. She was a delegate from the Eighteenth Assembly District of the State Convention of the Progressive Party at Syracuse.

== Early life and education ==
Ann Jemima Allebach was born on May 8, 1874 in Montgomery County, Pennsylvania, and grew up near Schwenksville. Her parents were Sarah Markley Allebach and Jacob R. Allebach, who was a banker and postmaster. As a child, she founded a chapter of Young People's Society of Christian Endeavour in her hometown. In 1893, she became a principal of a school in East Orange, New Jersey, and began her college studies. She studied at Ursinus College, New York University, Columbia University, and Union Theological Seminary.

== Career ==
Following her studies, she taught at Perkiomen Seminary in Pennsburg, Pennsylvania.

=== Ordination ===
She requested ordination from the minister of her home church and a minister in Philadelphia. They agreed to her request, though the culture in that part of Pennsylvania would remain generally opposed to women ministers for several decades. She was ordained on 15 January 1911 at the First Mennonite Church in Philadelphia. Following her ordination, she returned to New York City, living in Brooklyn.

In June 1913 she said:—

I foresee and foretell the time when, under good citizenship in the right sense and equality, an Americanized continent shall contemplate and inspire an Americanized world. Not a world or continents under single or similar control, but with governments moralized and spiritualized with the principles of liberty, equality, justice and opportunity regulated by righteous law, inspired by a righteous people, loving right, hating evil, helping the weak and restoring humanity to the plane of human brotherhood and sisterhood whereon it shall walk hand in hand with the Divine Fatherhood.

— Rev. Ann Allebach

=== Right to preach and suffrage ===
After returning to New York City, she spoke out about women's right to preach, and was also outspoken in supporting women's right to vote. In Brooklyn, she preached at the Marcy Avenue Baptist Church from 1913–1915. She also ministered to the poor, and was asked by the Mayor of New York to organize a conference on home religion and social services. She was frequently invited back to Pennsylvania to preach. In 1916, she was called to be the minister for the Sunnyside Reformed Church on Long Island.

== Death and legacy ==
On April 27, 1918, she died of a heart attack. She was the first ordained female Mennonite minister in North America.
