= Herald of Truth =

American Old Mennonite newspaper

The Herald of Truth was a religious newspaper founded by John F. Funk in 1864. It was the first periodical of the "Old" Mennonite Church (MC) and was also published in German as the Herold der Wahrheit. Funk published the Herald through Charles Hess of Chicago, Illinois, until 1867, when Funk's own company, John F. Funk & Brother (later the Mennonite Publishing Company) took over publication in Elkhart, Indiana. The newspaper was sold to the Mennonite Publication Board in 1908.

== History ==
The first issue was published 1 January 1864 in Chicago, Illinois. At the end of the first year, there were 1,200 subscribers.

The Herald was filled with sermons and biblical exegesis as well as stories of horrific deaths or warnings about keeping the Sabbath holy. While, at several times in the late 1860s and early 1870s, John F. Funk called for "an original number," the pages usually also featured selections from other evangelical periodicals or Anabaptist works.

=== Elkhart, Indiana ===
In 1867, founder John F. Funk moved his operation to Elkhart, Indiana, bringing 1,200 lbs. of type with him as well as a Cylinder press, reportedly the first in Elkhart. Funk printed the newspaper in the basement of a drug store until Funk built premises. By 1892, John F. Funk's Mennonite Publishing Company had 5 presses and 2 paper cutters.

=== Mennonite Immigration from Russia ===
The German-language edition, Herold der Wahrheit, reached German-speaking Mennonites living in colonies in the Russian Empire. The newspaper drew them into conversation with John F. Funk, who then arranged fundraising to aid their immigration to the United States and organized the logistics of their travel.

Though Funk began corresponding with Cornelius Jansen as early as 1871, the news of the possibility of Russian Mennonite immigration was kept out of the Herald of Truth until the summer of 1872. From that point onward, however, the Herald of Truth kept its readers abreast of the developments, including the description, in August 1872, of the four young men who had come as a kind of advance guard.

=== Decline ===
Various factors seem to have led to the decline of the Mennonite Publishing Company and the sale of the Herald of Truth and the company's other publications. In God Uses Ink, the institutional history of the Mennonite Publishing House, John A. Hostetler argues some of these factors include: conflict within Funk's church that led to removal from his position of Bishop in 1902, bankruptcy due to a bank failure in 1904, increasing competition from the Mennonite Tract and Book Society as well as the Gospel Witness (formed in 1905), and finally a devastating fire in 1907. James C. Juhnke suggests that many of those factors (other than the bank failure and the fire, of course) reflected Funk's personal unwillingness to yield control to a younger generation of Mennonite publishers and leaders. In any case, all of the Mennonite Publishing Company's periodicals were sold to the Mennonite Publishing Board for $8,000 in 1908. Beginning April 4, 1908, the Mennonite Publishing House issued the Gospel Herald, titled by taking one word from each of its preceding periodicals and edited by Daniel Kauffman.

=== Editors ===
- Jonas B. Miller (Grantsville, MD)

== Digital version and research materials ==
The entire run of Herald of Truth (1864–1908) and German language edition Herold der Wahrheit (1864–1901) are available online.

Herald of Truth founder John F. Funk's personal papers are housed in the Mennonite Church USA Archives.
