= Gospel Herald =

Defunct Mennonite periodical (1908–1998)

Gospel Herald (Scottdale, Pennsylvania) was the official publication of the Mennonite Church from 1908–1998. It was formed from a merger of Gospel Witness (Scottdale, Pennsylvania) and Herald of Truth (Elkhart, Indiana). As part of the merger of the Mennonite Church and the General Conference Mennonite Church, Gospel Herald merged with The Mennonite of the General Conference Mennonite Church to form a new periodical titled The Mennonite.

Gospel Herald has been digitized and is available online.
