= The Calvary Hour =

1936-2007 religious radio program

The Calvary Hour was a religious radio program based out of Ohio that was broadcast internationally. It was probably the earliest use of mass media by the Mennonite Church.

The Calvary Hour began in November, 1936, founded by the pastor of Sterling, Ohio’s Pleasant Hill Mennonite Church, William G. Detweiler shortly after his ordination. The program was based in Orrville, Ohio. It was not centered around Mennonite teachings, but was generally Evangelical in nature, focusing on general preaching and Bible readings. For more than twenty-five years the featured musical artists were the Amstutz Sisters Trio, who also accompanied Detweiler on tour and produced a series of 78 rpm records on their own record label, Faith.

Although produced by Mennonites, the program never had any official standing within any Mennonite denomination, in fact many refused association with the broadcast. In 1951 a schism developed between followers of Detweiler's program and the denomination's Franconia Conference. In 1952 the program was carried by 21 radio stations in the United States, but was available worldwide over HCJB. William died in 1956, and the program continued from Orrville, Ohio, under his twin sons Bill Detweiler and Bob Detweiler. In 1988 the program was heard over 30 radio stations across North and South America. For the final fourteen years, the program was recorded at Colors Audio in Akron, Ohio. Production of the program ended in 2007 upon Bill Detweiler's retirement; the last show was broadcast on December 30 of that year. The governing board felt that the audience would not transition to another speaker after the program had been in a single family for such a lengthy time period.

The program was broadcast on WDAC for the entire length of production.
