= John Christian Wenger =

American Mennonite theologian

John C. Wenger (December 25, 1910 – March 26, 1995) was an American Mennonite theologian and professor.

== Life ==
He was the eldest of five children born to A. Martin Wenger (1884–1960) and his wife, Martha A. Rock (1889–1975). He was born at the Reese H. White farm in Honey Brook, Pennsylvania, which his parents rented. His family moved in 1923 to Telford, where his father had gotten the job of janitor at the Rockhill Mennonite Church. Wenger was baptized on May 11, 1924, at the age of 13. He reported that he was disappointed when he did not feel a sense of "joy" and "Christian assurance" following the practice.

He attended Sellersville High School in Bucks County. He graduated in the class of 1928 as class president, valedictorian, president of the literary society, and captain of the debate team. That fall, he found work at the Royal Pants company in South Perkasie. He resigned in the spring of 1929 when his boss began asking him to pick up whiskey for him (that was during Prohibition).

With the assistance of Amos David Wenger, the president of the school, John was able to attend Eastern Mennonite School (now Eastern Mennonite University) for two years (1929–1931). He attended Goshen College for the final two years of college (1932-1934). One summer, he worked in the brickyard of D.D. Derstine. He was the vice-president of the junior class, president of the Young People's Christian Association, and a director of the Mennonite Historical Society. Harold S. Bender helped instill in Wenger the desire to go to seminary.

Upon his graduation, there was an opening for a minister at Rockhill. Wenger anticipated being given the position but was rejected because its bishops were uncomfortable with college education.

On 3 April 1937, Wenger married Ruth Derstine Detweiler (19 December 1906, Sellersville, Pennsylvania - 19 February 1992, Goshen, Indiana). They had four children: Daniel, John, Mary, and Elizabeth.

== Career ==
In 1935, he was invited to write the history of the Franconia Mennonite Conference between two years of study towards a master's degree at Westminster Theological Seminary in Philadelphia. In 1937, he embarked for Europe without his new bride. He attended classes at the University of Basel and the University of Zurich under Emil Brunner and Karl Barth. Ruth came to live with him on March 15, 1938. He returned in 1938 with a Doctorate of Theology from the University of Zurich.

Wenger had been invited to teach at Goshen college by President Sanford Calvin Yoder in 1936, and in early September 1938, he began a teaching career there. Also in 1938, he took the Westminster Examinations (which he had failed to do before leaving for Europe) and did badly. Wenger joined the editorial board of the Mennonite Weekly Review in March 1939. He took summer courses at University of Michigan at Ann Arbor in 1939, 1940, and 1942, earning him an M.A. in Philosophy.

Wenger taught at Goshen College and Goshen Biblical Seminary from 1938 to 1969. When the Goshen Biblical Seminary moved to a new campus in Elkhart, he went with and taught there from 1969 - 198]. Goshen Biblical Seminary then shared the Elkhart campus with Mennonite Biblical Seminary. The two eventually merged into Associated Mennonite Biblical Seminary.

In 1965, Wenger was appointed to be a part of the Committee on Biblical Translation. The CBT met between 1965 and 1978 to oversee the translation the New International Version.

== Works ==
In addition to articles, booklets, and chapters in larger works, Wenger wrote 22 books such as the following:

- History of the Mennonites of the Franconia Conference, 1937.
- Glimpses of Mennonite History and Doctrine, 1947.
- Separated Unto God, 1951.
- Introduction to Theology, 1954.
- The Mennonites in Indiana and Michigan, 1961.
- Even Unto Death, 1961.
- Mennonite Church in America, 1966.
- God’s Word Written, 1966.
- Disciples of Jesus, 1977.
- The Book We Call the Bible, 1980.

Wenger also edited a number of books including:

- The Complete writings of Menno Simons, Translated by Leonard Verduin, 1956.
- They Met God: A Number of Conversion Accounts and Personal Testimonies of God’s Presence and Leading in the Lives of His Children, 1964.

The NIV is still used today.

Wenger wrote the chapter on Mennonites in the Encyclopædia Britannica and the Encyclopedia Americana.

Wenger's personal records are held at the Mennonite Church USA Archives and can be found here.
