= John F. Funk =

American publisher and Mennonite leader (1835–1830)

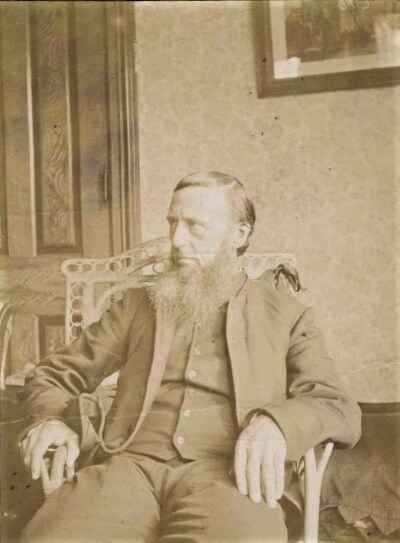
Funk, circa 1870-80

John Fretz Funk (April 6, 1835 – January 8, 1930) was a publisher and leader of the Mennonite Church. Funk published the Herald of Truth from 1864 until 1908 when it merged with the Gospel Witness to form the Gospel Herald. Jacob Clemens Kolb, in his preface to Bless the Lord, O My Soul quotes an unnamed commentator who said, "John F. Funk is the most important [Mennonite] man after Menno Simons."

== Biography ==
=== Early life ===
John Fretz Funk was born on April 6, 1835, in Hilltown Township, Bucks County, Pennsylvania, to Jacob Funk and Salome Fretz Funk. He was the great-grandson of Bishop Heinrich Funck (Henry Funk), who had immigrated to the Colony of Pennsylvania before 1720 on the ship Friendship.

Attended Freeland Seminary (now Ursinus College) to become a public school teacher but taught for only two years in his home community before accepting the invitation of his brother-in-law Jacob Beidler to go, in 1857, to Chicago, Illinois, to join him in his lumber business.

=== Chicago ===
In Chicago, Funk converted, in 1858, to Christianity at a Presbyterian revival and became heavily involved in various church activities and became a close acquaintance of noted American Evangelist Dwight L. Moody.

In 1860, Funk returned home to Bucks County, Pennsylvania, to be baptized in the Mennonite Church and returned again in 1864 to marry Salome Kratz. Also in 1864, Funk began publishing the Herald of Truth.

=== Elkhart ===
In 1867, John F. Funk moved to Elkhart, Indiana, with his wife and young daughter.

On January 8, 1930, John F. Funk died at the age of 94 and was buried in the Prairie Street Cemetery.

== Ministry ==
In Chicago in 1861, Funk was made superintendent of the Milwaukee Depot Sunday School.

Funk was ordained as a minister for a Mennonite congregation near Gardner, Illinois, in 1865.

About 1866, Funk and Peter Neff began a small Mennonite congregation in Chicago which lasted until Neff's house, the church's meeting place, was destroyed in the Great Chicago Fire of 1871.

=== Prairie Street Mennonite Church ===
In 1870, Funk and other Mennonites living in and around Elkhart began meeting for church services in members' homes. A church building was completed in 1871 and the church was thereafter named Prairie Street Mennonite Church after the road on which it was situated.

Funk became a bishop of the Mennonite Church on June 6, 1892, and served in that capacity until 1902 when he was relieved of his duties as bishop.

== Publishing ==
As a young man in Pennsylvania, Funk wrote some letters to the editor of the local paper. When he moved to Chicago, he began to subscribe to Das Christliche Volks-Blatt, a paper edited by John H. Oberholtzer who had broken from the Mennonite Church near Funk's hometown.

In 1863, in the midst of the American Civil War, Funk published War: Its Evils, Our Duty, his first printing endeavor.

On moving to Elkhart, Funk began his publishing company, originally named "John F. Funk and Brother" (as his younger brother A. K. Funk joined him in the venture). The company was incorporated as Mennonite Publishing Company in 1875.

The most well known and enduring works to come out of Funk's publishing house were the English translations of The Complete Works of Menno Simons and Martyrs Mirror.

=== Herald of Truth ===
In 1864, John F. Funk began the Herald of Truth a religious newspaper, published in both English and German. It was the first periodical of the "Old" Mennonite Church. The Herald consisted of a mix of published sermons, short articles of evangelical exhortation, poetry, accounts of journeys, Biblical exegesis, and obituaries. Though the Herald usually published quite a bit of "original" material, it nearly always also included selections from other publications such as the Sunday School Times or the works of Menno Simons.

=== Young Denominational Leaders ===
Funk's publishing company attracted many young men who went on to be leaders in the Mennonite church. These include:

- John S. Coffman
- John Horsch
- G. L. Bender
- H. A. Mumaw

=== Decline ===
John A. Hostetler argues in God Uses Ink that Funk's removal from his position of Bishop in 1902, increasing competition from the Mennonite Tract and Book Society as well as the Gospel Witness, bankruptcy due to a bank failure in 1904, and finally a devastating fire in 1907 caused the steep decline in the fortunes of John F. Funk's Mennonite Publishing Company. James C. Juhnke argues that many of those factors reflected Funk's unwillingness to yield to a younger generation of Mennonite leaders. In any case, all of the company's periodicals were sold to the Mennonite Publishing Board in 1908.

== Aid to Russian Mennonite Immigrants ==
When, in the 1870s, the Russian Empire moved to nationalize the diverse population within its borders and thus void military exemptions given to Mennonite colonies there, Funk invited representatives of those Mennonite communities to visit the United States and consider immigrating there. In 1872, four young men representing the Russian Mennonites toured the United States and Canada, evaluating the potential of immigration. John F. Funk hosted the young men at his house, just as he would later host many of the flood of Russian Mennonites he had helped immigrate, most of whom arrived in 1874.

== Legacy ==
John F. Funk is credited with introducing Sunday schools and other church functions into the Mennonite church, which he drew from his time in Chicago, when he had attended churches of other denominations.

Funk collected many volumes of Mennonite history which formed the core of the Mennonite Historical Library.

One of Funk's daughters, Phoebe, married Abram B. Kolb, who worked with Funk at the Mennonite Publishing Company.

Funk's personal papers are housed in the Mennonite Church USA Archives.

== Works ==
- Warfare: Its Evils, Our Duty, 1863.
- The Mennonite Church and Her Accusers; a vindication of the character of the Mennonite Church of America from her first organization in this country to the present time, 1878
- A Biographical Sketch of Bishop Christian Herr, compiled by John F. Funk, 1887
- The Peaceful Kingdom of Christ or An Exposition of the 20th Chapter of the Book of Revelations, by Peter J. Twisk Translated by John F. Funk, 1913
