= Sewing circle (Mennonite) =

Monthly meeting of Mennonite women for sewing charity goods

A sewing circle is a monthly meeting of Mennonite women for the purpose of sewing bedding and clothing to be distributed by service and missionary organizations to people in need around the world. The Women's Missionary and Service Commission grew out of such sewing circles.

== History of Sewing Circle Organizations ==
Mennonite women of Eastern Pennsylvania were sewing clothing for the needy as early as 1895 and it was only a short time before they organized themselves into the Paradise Sewing Circle in 1897. Women in Ontario were sewing clothes for distribution by deacons around the same time. The next decade saw more sewing circles organized in Pennsylvania, Illinois, Minnesota, Indiana, Ohio, and Ontario, notably at Science Ridge Mennonite Church in Sterling, Illinois, and Prairie Street Mennonite Church in Elkhart, Indiana, as early as 1900.

Clara Eby Steiner, widow of Menno Steiner, began calling for a more general society of Mennonite sewing circles around 1911, an effort that was accomplished in 1916. The organization continued to evolve, eventually broadening to other kinds of service and mission in the Women's Missionary and Service Commission.

== See also ==
- Fragment Society
