= Howard-Miami Mennonite Church =

Coordinates: 40°33′53″N 85°59′47″W

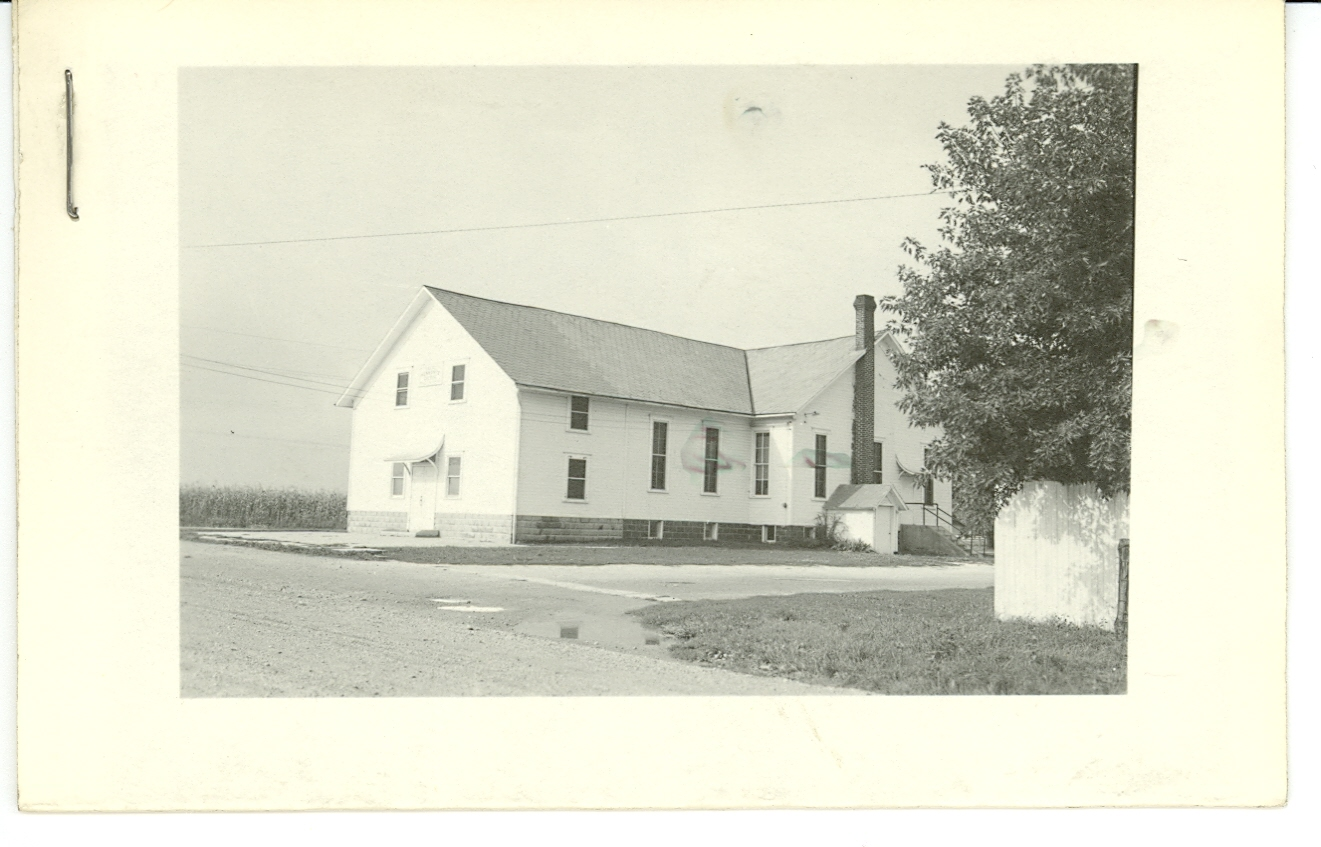
Howard-Miami Mennonite Church in Kokomo, Indiana on September 7, 1948. Citation: Mennonite Community Photographs, 1947–1953. The Congregation. (HM4-134 Box 5 Folder 1 photo 010.5-8) Mennonite Church USA Archives, Goshen, Indiana.

Howard-Miami Mennonite Church is a historical Mennonite church located in Amboy, Indiana, on the edge of Howard and Miami counties, about 12 miles from the city of Kokomo. It is affiliated with the Evana Network. It is the oldest Mennonite church in Indiana, having conducted church services starting in 1848.

== History ==
The first Mennonite settlers were from Holmes County, Ohio, and arrived in Miami county in 1848. From these meager beginnings the church grew and built their first church house in 1871. Major remodeling has occurred six times over the years, the most recent being the addition of a large fellowship hall in 1987. Remodeling of the sanctuary occurred in 1999.

Since 2008, the congregation has supported the Cattle Project, which raises and slaughters cattle which is then donated to Kokomo Urban Outreach and its food pantry.

== Building ==
The church is nestled on three acres of land surrounded by rich corn and soybean fields. The building is wheelchair accessible and features a large sanctuary with beautiful stained-glass artistry behind the stage and a balcony with multiple classrooms. It also has two basements for the children's ministry, a large entry and fellowship hall with attached kitchen and also a cozy library. Off the fellowship hall is the main office and pastors’ offices. Outside there is a pavilion with roof (added in 2020) and kitchen area and a playground.

== Ongoing missions ==
The church currently has mission partners in Slovenia, Uganda, and the United States.
