= Mennonite Church USA Archives =

The Mennonite Church USA Archives was founded in 2001 under the denominational merger of the (old) Mennonite Church and the General Conference Mennonite Church. Prior to 2001, the two largest Mennonite denominations maintained separate archives: the Archives of the Mennonite Church, located on the Goshen College (Goshen, Indiana) campus, housed materials pertaining to the (old) Mennonite Church, while the Mennonite Library and Archives on the Bethel College (North Newton, Kansas) campus held the records of the General Conference Mennonite Church.

From 2001 to 2012, the two repositories remained physically separate but were merged administratively, with oversight from the Mennonite Church USA Historical Committee. In 2012, the Historical Committee was disbanded and the two repositories came under the administration of the Mennonite Church USA Executive Board.

In March 2017, the Mennonite Church USA Archives moved from its former location on the campus of Goshen College to the Mennonite Church USA denominational building in Elkhart, Indiana. Goshen College institutional and faculty records – most notably the personal papers of Harold S. Bender and Guy F. Hershberger, among others – remain at Goshen College and are no longer managed by the Mennonite Church USA Archives.

In July 2017, Mennonite Church USA ceded ownership of the records of the former General Conference Mennonite Church to the Mennonite Library and Archives at Bethel College.

== Collections ==
The Mennonite Church USA Archives is the official repository for the institutional records of the denomination and its agencies, created between 2001 and the present. The archives also house the historical records of the (old) Mennonite Church and other affiliated organizations, including:

- Mennonite World Conference
- Africa Inter-Mennonite Mission
- Mennonite Mission Network
- Mennonite Education Agency
- MennoMedia
- Christian Peacemaker Teams
- Mennonite conferences
- Mennonite congregations

In addition to institutional records, the archive maintains a manuscript collection documenting Mennonite history, theology, and faith practices through the writings and collected materials of significant Mennonite thinkers such as John Howard Yoder, J.C. Wenger, John F. Funk, John S. Coffman, Lois Gunden Clemens, and Emma Richards.

== History ==
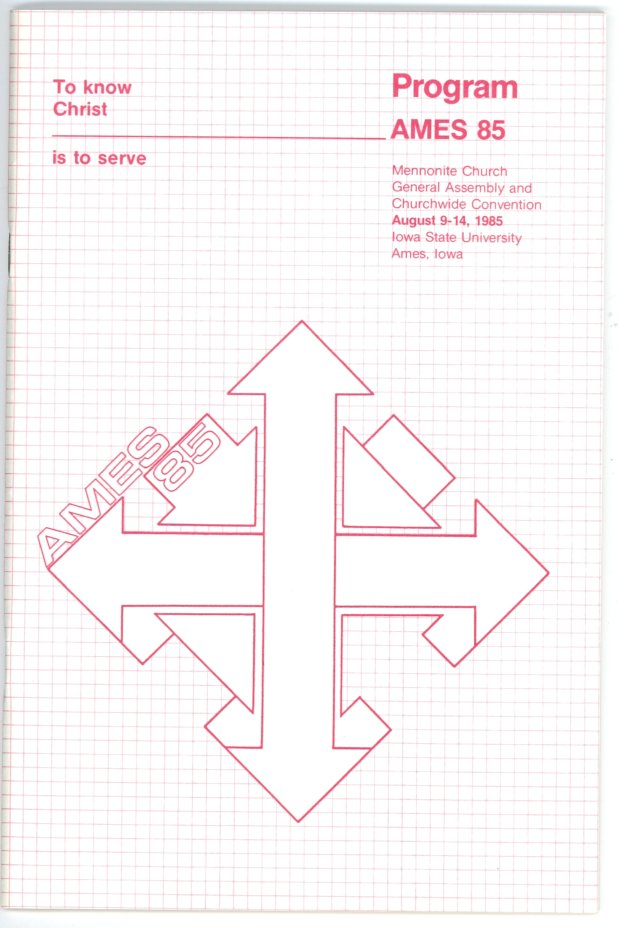
Program from the Mennonite Church General Assembly, archived as I‑5‑1 Box 2 at the Mennonite Church USA Archives in Goshen, Indiana.

Mennonite archival endeavors in North America began in earnest during the early part of the 20th century. In 1911, ten men, including John Horsch and J.B. Smith, in Johnstown, PA, were appointed by the (old) Mennonite Church to create a document of church history. Two years later, the conference began buying books on church history and by 1923 had amassed 200 titles at their library in Scottdale, Pennsylvania. After John F. Funk's library was added to the collection, the committee self-proclaimed their records as "the most valuable library on Mennonite History in America" Eventually the Historical Committee, under Harold S. Bender, began moving towards a central building for archives in Goshen.

In the same year, 1911, the General Conference Mennonite Church began taking steps to create an intentionally preserved historical record. At an assembly in Bluffton, Ohio, Silas M. Grubb lamented to other delegates, "What a sad commentary it is upon the historical sense of our people when the only records available are those upon the tomb-stones." C.H. Wedel and H.R. Voth were members of this group.

The Archives of the Mennonite Church (as it was called at the time) was founded in 1937 and originally housed in the basement floor of the school's library. In 1959, the Archives moved to the new Goshen Biblical Seminary Building (later renamed Newcomer Center, when the seminary merged with the Mennonite Biblical Seminary of the General Conference Mennonite Church to form Associated Mennonite Biblical Seminary and moved to Elkhart, Indiana).

Until 2012, the Mennonite Church USA Archives was the official repository for the historical records of the Mennonite Central Committee, a binational relief and development organization with offices in Akron, Pennsylvania and Winnipeg, Manitoba. These records are now located with and managed by the organization itself. In response to a continued decline in financial support for the archives and a need for more storage space, in 2016 Mennonite Church USA decided to transfer collections to its administrative headquarters in nearby Elkhart and completed the move in March 2017.

In addition to the Mennonite Church USA Archives (Elkhart, Indiana) and the Mennonite Library and Archives (North Newton, Kansas), there are several other regional Mennonite archives located across the country. These include the Mennonite Historical Library and Goshen College Archives at Goshen College (Goshen, Indiana), the Menno Simons Library and Archives at Eastern Mennonite University (Harrisonburg, Virginia), the Bluffton University (Bluffton, Ohio) Archives, the Lancaster Mennonite Historical Society (Lancaster, Pennsylvania), the Mennonite Heritage Center (Harleysville, Pennsylvania), the Heritage Hall Museum & Archives (Freeman, South Dakota), and the Pacific Northwest Mennonite Historical Society (Hubbard, Oregon).

== Bomb scare ==
On February 1, 2011, an archivist happened across two large caliber shells, a grenade and a small aerial bomb in the Mennonite Church USA Archives. These materials had been donated by George Springer, a post World War I relief worker in France. The Elkhart Police Department was brought in to dispose of the ordnance. Other artifacts among George Springer's papers, including trench art created by German prisoners of war, were donated to the Mennonite Historical Library and the Museum of the Soldier in Portland, Indiana.
