= Black Mennonites =

Religious demographic

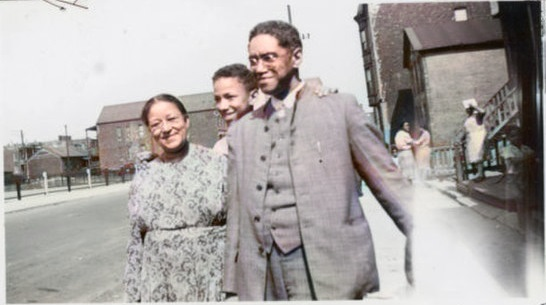
An African-American Mennonite family, James and Rowena Lark with their son Alex, Chicago, 1947

Black Mennonites are people who are both Mennonite and Black. Black Mennonites live in Africa, the United States, Canada, and elsewhere. Black Mennonite communities have existed in the United States and Canada since the late 1800s. Ethiopia and the Democratic Republic of the Congo are home to the second and fourth largest populations of Mennonites in the world. Tanzania, Zimbabwe, Kenya, and Angola also have some of the largest populations of Mennonites in the world. Glen Alexander Guyton, the first African-American leader of the Mennonite Church USA, has stated that "The typical Mennonite is an African woman", due to Mennonite missionary outreach in Africa, and that African Mennonites "are now sending missionaries to Europe and the United States." While Mennonites have historically been mostly white people of Central or Eastern European descent, with population centers in North America and Europe, Black Mennonites now outnumber white Mennonites globally. African Mennonite churches have had a larger number of members than North American Mennonite churches since 2006.

== History ==
=== Canada ===
In 1882, Charles Jones became the first Black member of the Ontario Mennonite Church, taking the Black Mennonite status to the level of church membership.

=== South Africa ===
Stanley Green, a Coloured South African Mennonite, was installed as the president of the Mennonite Board of Missions in 1994. Green was the first person of African heritage to serve in this role.

=== United States ===
In 1886, Krimmer Mennonite Brethren was established in the mining community of Elk Park, North Carolina, as the first African American Mennonite mission.

In 1897, the first African Americans were baptized as members of a Mennonite church. Robert, Mary Elizabeth, and Cloyd Carter were baptized at Lauver Mennonite Church, a congregation in the Juniata district of the Lancaster Mennonite Conference.

In 1898, Welsh Mountain Mission in New Holland, Pennsylvania, was founded as a mission to African Americans. Elmer Boots was baptized as the first African-American member in 1917.

The Los Angeles Mennonite Church was established in 1920. The church was renamed the Calvary Mennonite Church in 1942.

In 1920, the Virginia Mennonite Conference debated whether to allow African Americans to become members. The conference decided to allow Black members "with caution."

In 1920, Homer Church and Geneva Mercomes became the first African American students enrolled at Bethel College, a Mennonite college in North Newton, Kansas.

Rondo Horton became the first African American ordained as a minister of the Mennonite Brethren church in 1933.

In 1940, the Virginia Mennonite Conference issued policies segregating the rites of baptism, foot washing, the holy kiss, and communion according to race.

In 1943, Juanita Lark became the first African American student to graduate from Goshen College, a Mennonite college in Goshen, Indiana.

In 1945, James and Rowena Lark founded the Dearborn Street Mission, which eventually became Bethel Mennonite Church on Chicago's near west side.

In 1948, Willis Johnson became the first African American to enroll as a part-time student at Eastern Mennonite College in Harrisonburg, Virginia. In 1949, Ada Webb became the first full-time African American student.

By 1950, there were only about 150 Black Mennonites in the United States.

James Lark was the first Black person ordained as a Mennonite bishop. Lark was ordained as a Mennonite minister in 1945 and ordained as a bishop in 1954 in Chicago. Rowena Lark was an important figure in Mennonite outreach, a children's storyteller, and a soloist. Rowena and James were husband and wife.

Vincent Harding, a prominent Black Mennonite and civil right activist, gave a speech at Woodlawn Mennonite Church in Chicago in 1959 during a seminar about race and racism. Harding was a professor at several universities, an author, and a speech writer for Martin Luther King Jr. Harding outlines three points of order during his speech promoting the necessity of racial unity within and outside of the Mennonite church: that "problem of race" should be defined as a moral and spiritual problem, that White Mennonites should confess the "sins of irresponsibility" that had plagued previous attempts at racial dialogue within Mennonite communities, and making Mennonites "near the heat of the battle" by making themselves visible in anti-racist struggles.

In 1960, Brother Lark became the interim pastor at Calvary Mennonite Church in Los Angeles.

The Black Caucus of the (old) Mennonite Church was formed in 1971.

Between 1950 and 1980, the number of Black Mennonites in the United States increased to 1,600 members in 49 Black and integrated churches.

Joy Lovett was elected as the first Black associate general secretary of the Mennonite Church in 1983.

Between 1985 and 1995, the Mennonite Church engaged in a concerted effort to reach out to urban communities. Because of this outreach, the number of African-American Mennonite churches increased to around 50.

Dwight McFadden began a two-year term as moderator of the Mennonite Church in 1997, the first African-American to serve as moderator.

In 2015, the historically Black Calvary Community Church in Hampton, Virginia was the largest Mennonite church in the United States.

In 2018, Glen Alexander Guyton became the first person of color and the first African-American to serve as the leader of the Mennonite Church USA. Guyton is a member of the San Antonio Mennonite Church. In the same year, around 70 Mennonites of color gathered in San Antonio for an anti-racist conference, 55% of them being Black Mennonites.

== Notable Black Mennonites ==
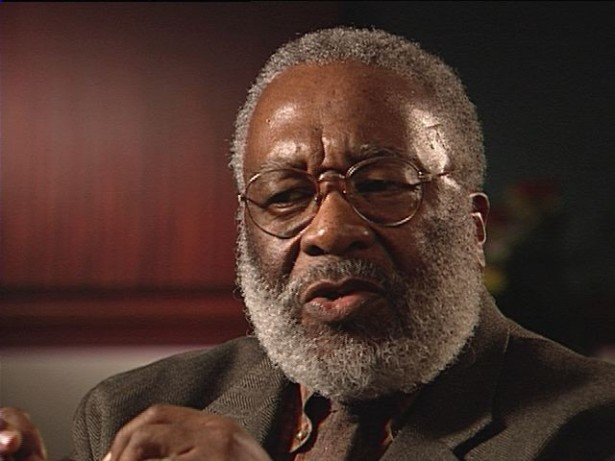
Vincent Harding

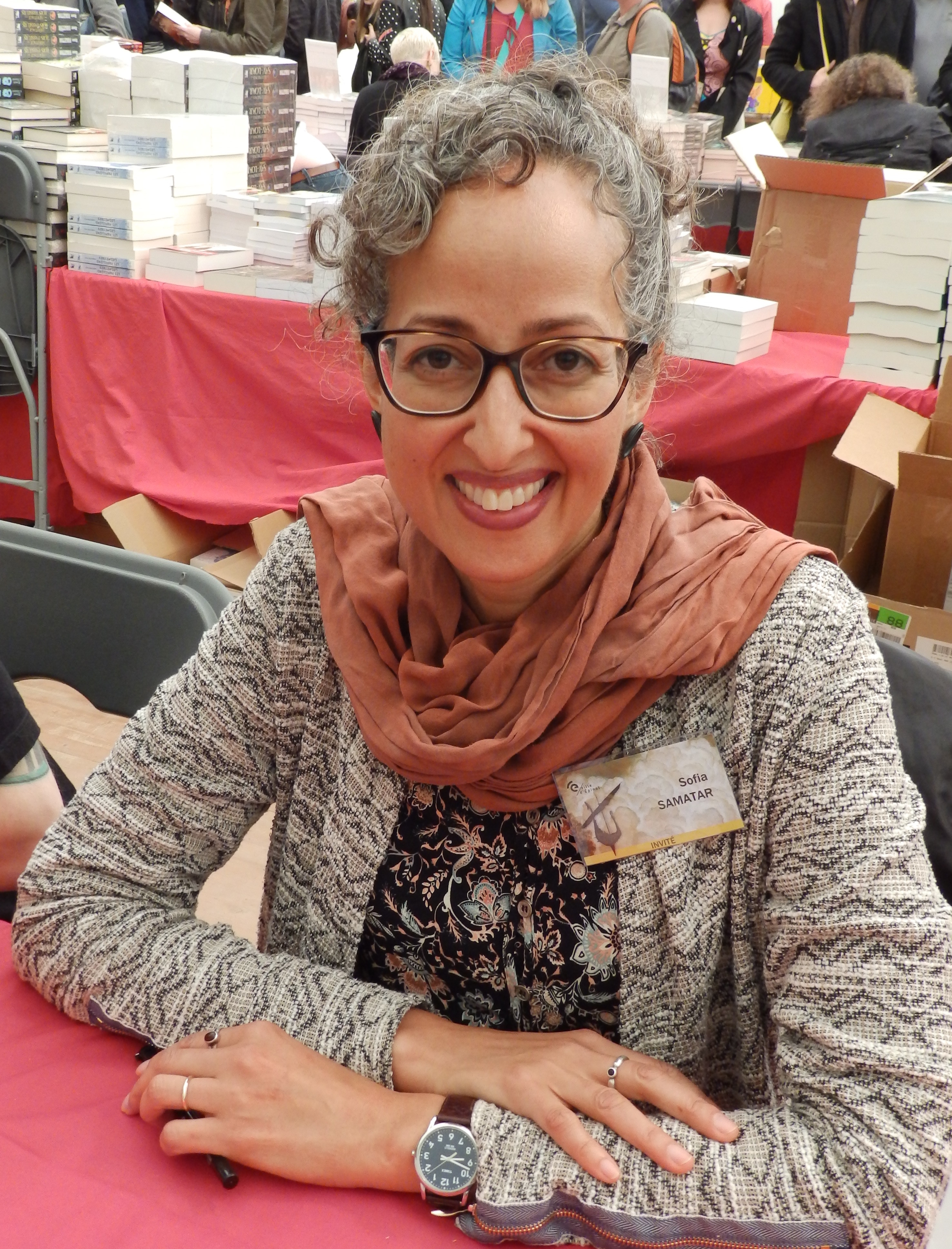
Sofia Samatar
- Vincent Harding, an American pastor, historian, and scholar best known for his work alongside Martin Luther King Jr.
- Sofia Samatar, an American educator, poet, and writer.

== See also ==
- Ethnic Mennonite
- Meserete Kristos Church
