= Mennonite Church (1683–2002) =

Umbrella organization of Mennonite church conferences

MC logo

The Mennonite Church (MC), also known as the Old Mennonite Church, was formerly the oldest and largest body of Mennonites in North America. It was a loosely-affiliated collection of Mennonite conferences based in the United States and Canada, mainly of Swiss and South German origin. The group dated to the settlement of Germantown in 1683 and included 112,311 members in North America in 1997. Many of the conferences that were considered part of the Old Mennonite Church participated in the Mennonite General Conference from 1898-1971 and the Mennonite General Assembly from 1971-2002. The Mennonite General Assembly voted to merge with the General Conference Mennonite Church at a joint session in Wichita, Kansas, in 1995. In 2002, the two groups merged and then divided along national lines into Mennonite Church USA and Mennonite Church Canada.

== Origins ==
The conferences that made up the Mennonite Church originated from two groups, Mennonites and Amish.

== Polity and ministry ==
The polity of the Mennonite Church varied because of influences of various originating groups and settlement patterns. It also changed over time. The basic pattern was a conference-based polity with conferences having authority over local congregations. Conferences had authority on doctrine and practice and could discipline ministers and congregations. Congregations selected ministers and owned church buildings. The parts of the Mennonite Church with Amish origin tended to give more authority over doctrine and practice to leaders of local congregations.

The traditional pattern of ministry was a plural unsalaried ministry with a bishop, preacher, and deacon. In many conferences, bishops were assigned to several congregations, though Amish-origin congregations often had a single bishop per congregation. In the 1950s and 1960s, this pattern began to change. Congregations began calling pastors to replace preachers. In the more progressive parts of the Mennonite church, these pastors were seminary-trained and salaried. The office of bishop was renamed as a superintendent or overseer in many conferences. The office of deacon declined in usage. By the 1990s, most of the conferences participating in Mennonite General Assembly had a pastor for each local congregation and district superintendents or overseers rather than traditional plural ministry, with the significant exception of the strong bishop system in Lancaster Mennonite Conference.

== Participating conferences ==
In 1957, the conferences that participated in Mennonite General Conference were:

- Franconia (no official delegates to General Conference)
- Lancaster (no official delegates to General Conference)
- Washington County, Maryland and Franklin County, Pennsylvania (no official delegates to General Conference)
- Ontario
- Virginia
- Ohio and Eastern
- Indiana and Michigan
- Illinois
- Allegheny
- Iowa and Nebraska
- South Central
- Alberta and Saskatchewan
- Pacific Coast
- Conservative Mennonite (no official delegates to General Conference)
- North Central
- Ontario Amish Mennonite (no official delegates to General Conference)
- South Pacific
- Puerto Rico
- India
- Argentina

In 1997, the conferences that participated in Mennonite General Assembly were:

- Allegheny Mennonite Conference
- Atlantic Coast Conference of the Mennonite Church
- Franconia Mennonite Conference
- Franklin Mennonite Conference
- Gulf States Mennonite Conference
- Illinois Mennonite Conference
- Indiana-Michigan Mennonite Conference
- Iowa-Nebraska Conference of the Mennonite Church
- Lancaster Mennonite Conference
- Mennonite Conference of Eastern Canada
- New York Mennonite Conference
- Pacific Southwest Mennonite Conference
- Puerto Rico Mennonite Conference
- Rocky Mountain Mennonite Conference
- South Central Mennonite Conference
- Southeast Mennonite Conference
- Virginia Mennonite Conference
