= Rosemarie Freeney Harding =

American teacher, social worker, civil rights leader, and healer (1930-2004)

- Born: July 24, 1930; Chicago, Illinois
- Died: February 29, 2004 (aged 73); Denver, Colorado
- Education: Goshen College, Goddard College, University of Denver
- Occupations: Educator, human rights activist, counselor

Rosemarie Freeney Harding (1930-2004) was an American Mennonite educator and civil rights activist.

== Biography ==
Harding née Freeney was born on July 24, 1930, in Chicago, Illinois. She attended Goshen College, Goddard College, and the University of Denver. In 1960 she married Vincent Harding with whom she had two children. In 1961, the couple moved to Atlanta, Georgia where they founded and managed the Mennonite House there and participated in the Southern Freedom Movement. In 1974 the couple moved to Philadelphia, Pennsylvania, and later, in 1979 to the Wallingford area of Pennsylvania where they worked at the Pendle Hill Quaker Center for Study and Contemplation. In 1997, the Hardings founded the organization "Gandhi-Hamer-King Center for the Study of Religion and Democratic Renewal". It is now known as the "Veterans of Hope Project".

Harding died on February 29, 2004, in Denver, Colorado.

In 2015, Harding's memoir, Remnants: A Memoir of Spirit, Activism, and Mothering was published posthumously by Duke University Press. Her daughter Rachel was a coauthor.
