= East Lampeter Township, Pennsylvania =

Township in Pennsylvania, US

Coordinates: 40°04′00″N 76°15′23″W

- Township
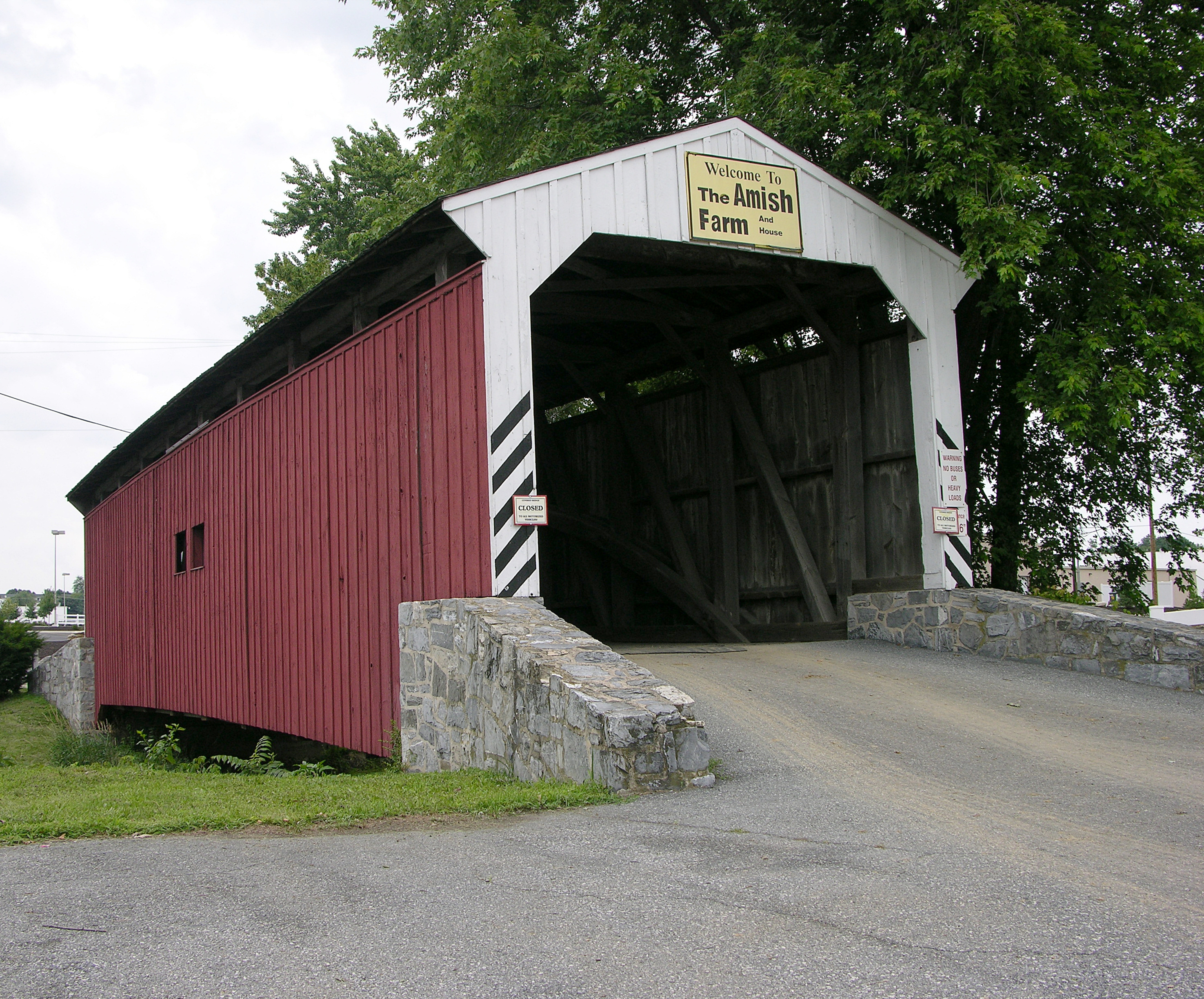
- Willow Hill Covered Bridge in East Lampeter Township

- Flag Seal

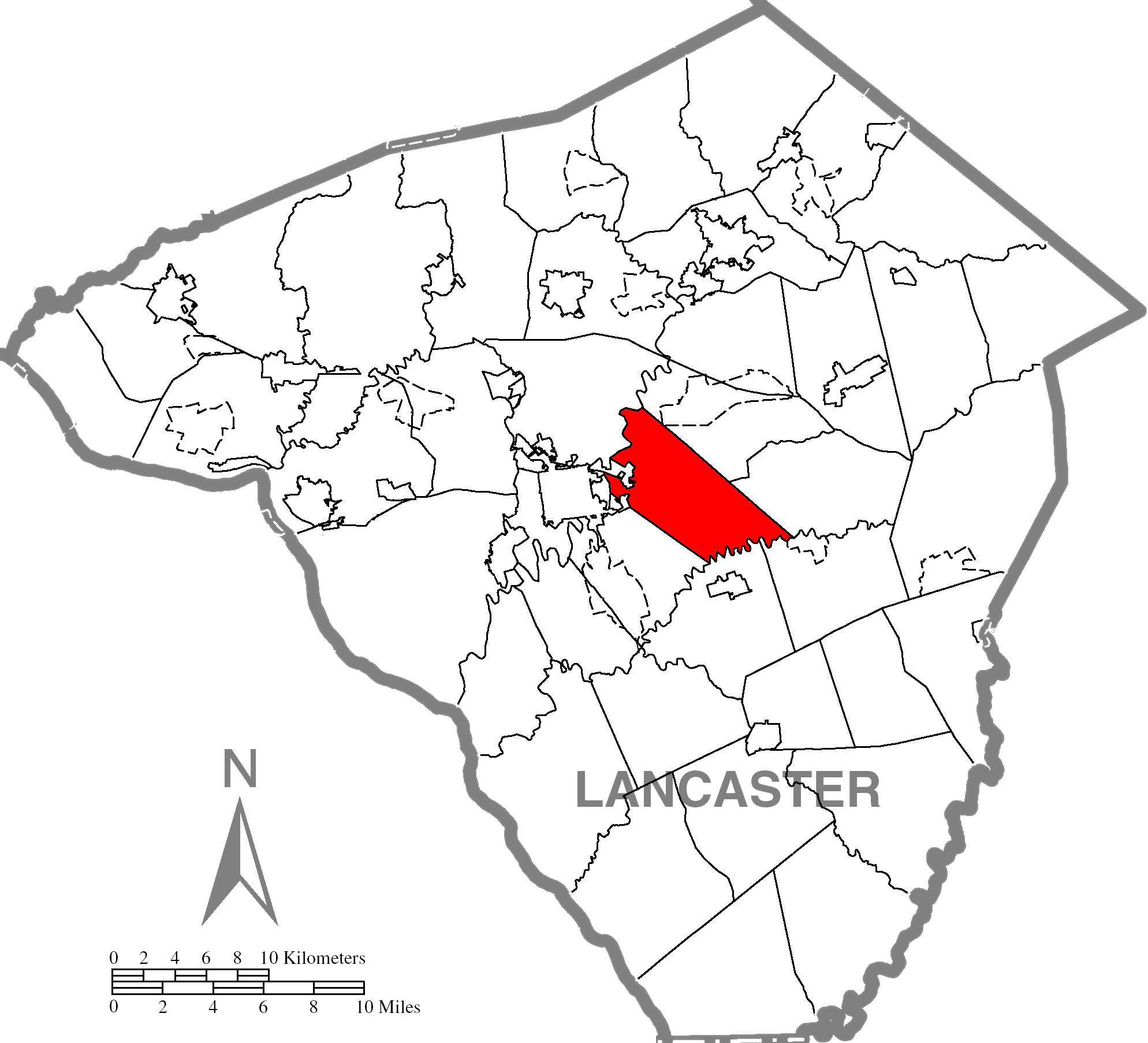
- Map of Lancaster County, Pennsylvania highlighting East Lampeter Township

- Map of Lancaster County, Pennsylvania
- Country: United States
- State: Pennsylvania
- County: Lancaster
- Settled: 1723
- Incorporated: 1841

Government
  - Type: Board of Supervisors

Area
  - Total: 19.95 sq mi (51.66 km^{2})
  - Land: 19.66 sq mi (50.91 km^{2})
  - Water: 0.29 sq mi (0.75 km^{2})

Population (2020)
  - Total: 17,776
  - Estimate (2024): 18,830 ▲
  - Density: 958/sq mi (370/km^{2})
- Time zone: UTC-5 (Eastern (EST))
  - Summer (DST): UTC-4 (EDT)
- Area code: 717
- FIPS code: 42-071-21344
- Website: eastlampetertownship.org

East Lampeter Township is a township in central Lancaster County, Pennsylvania, United States. At the 2020 census, the population was 17,834.

East Lampeter Township is one of the six suburbs that border the city of Lancaster, all sharing the same ZIP code with Lancaster. Though the township is predominantly rural and agricultural, the busy highway U.S. 30, also known as the Lincoln Highway, crosses the township from the northwest to the southeast, traveling about eight and one-half miles. The two and one-half mile stretch bordering the city of Lancaster is very congested and serves many businesses including East Town Mall, the Lancaster Mennonite School, Dutch Wonderland amusement park, Tanger Outlets, The Shops at Rockvale, and several hotels and fast food businesses.

== History ==
The Herr's Mill Covered Bridge, Michael Dohner Farmhouse, Bird-in-Hand Hotel, Christian Stauffer House, and Witmer's Tavern are listed on the National Register of Historic Places.

The Dutch Wonderland amusement park opened in the township in 1963. The former Wax Museum of Lancaster County History was also located in the township, directly adjacent to Dutch Wonderland, from 1969 until 2006.

== Geography ==
According to the U.S. Census Bureau, the township has a total area of 20.0 square miles (52 km^{2}), of which 20.0 square miles (52 km^{2}) is land and 0.1 square miles (0.26 km^{2}) (0.30%) is water. Unincorporated communities and neighborhoods in the township include Zooks Corner, Hornig, Holland Heights, Witmer, Bridgeport, Eastland Hills, Smoketown, Bird-in-Hand, Fertility, Greenland, Ronks, and Soudersburg.

== Demographics ==
Historical population
Census	Pop.	Note	%±
2000	13,556		—
2010	16,424		21.2%
2020	17,776		8.2%
2024 (est.)	18,830		5.9%
U.S. Decennial Census

As of the census of 2000, there were 13,556 people, 5,342 households, and 3,739 families residing in the township. The population density was 679.5 people per square mile (262.4 people/km^{2}). There were 5,611 housing units at an average density of 281.2 per square mile (108.6/km^{2}). The racial makeup of the township was 92.13% White, 2.11% Black or African American, 0.07% Native American, 2.72% Asian, 0.03% Pacific Islander, 1.85% from other races, and 1.09% from two or more races. 3.87% of the population were Hispanic or Latino of any race. The township has a large Amish and Mennonite population.

There were 5,342 households, out of which 30.3% had children under the age of 18 living with them, 59.0% were married couples living together, 7.7% had a female householder with no husband present, and 30.0% were non-families. 24.5% of all households were made up of individuals, and 7.9% had someone living alone who was 65 years of age or older. The average household size was 2.53 and the average family size was 3.05.

In the township the population was spread out, with 25.5% under the age of 18, 7.3% from 18 to 24, 29.6% from 25 to 44, 22.9% from 45 to 64, and 14.6% who were 65 years of age or older. The median age was 37 years. For every 100 females, there were 97.7 males. For every 100 females age 18 and over, there were 94.0 males.

The median income for a household in the township was $46,179, and the median income for a family was $54,494. Males had a median income of $36,718 versus $25,578 for females. The per capita income for the township was $22,744. About 4.9% of families and 6.5% of the population were below the poverty line, including 10.8% of those under age 18 and 6.0% of those age 65 or over.

== Schools ==
In 2017 the public school system is the Conestoga Valley School District. There is also a campus of the Lancaster Mennonite School in the township, as well as other private schools. The Lancaster campus of Harrisburg Area Community College is located in East Lampeter Township.

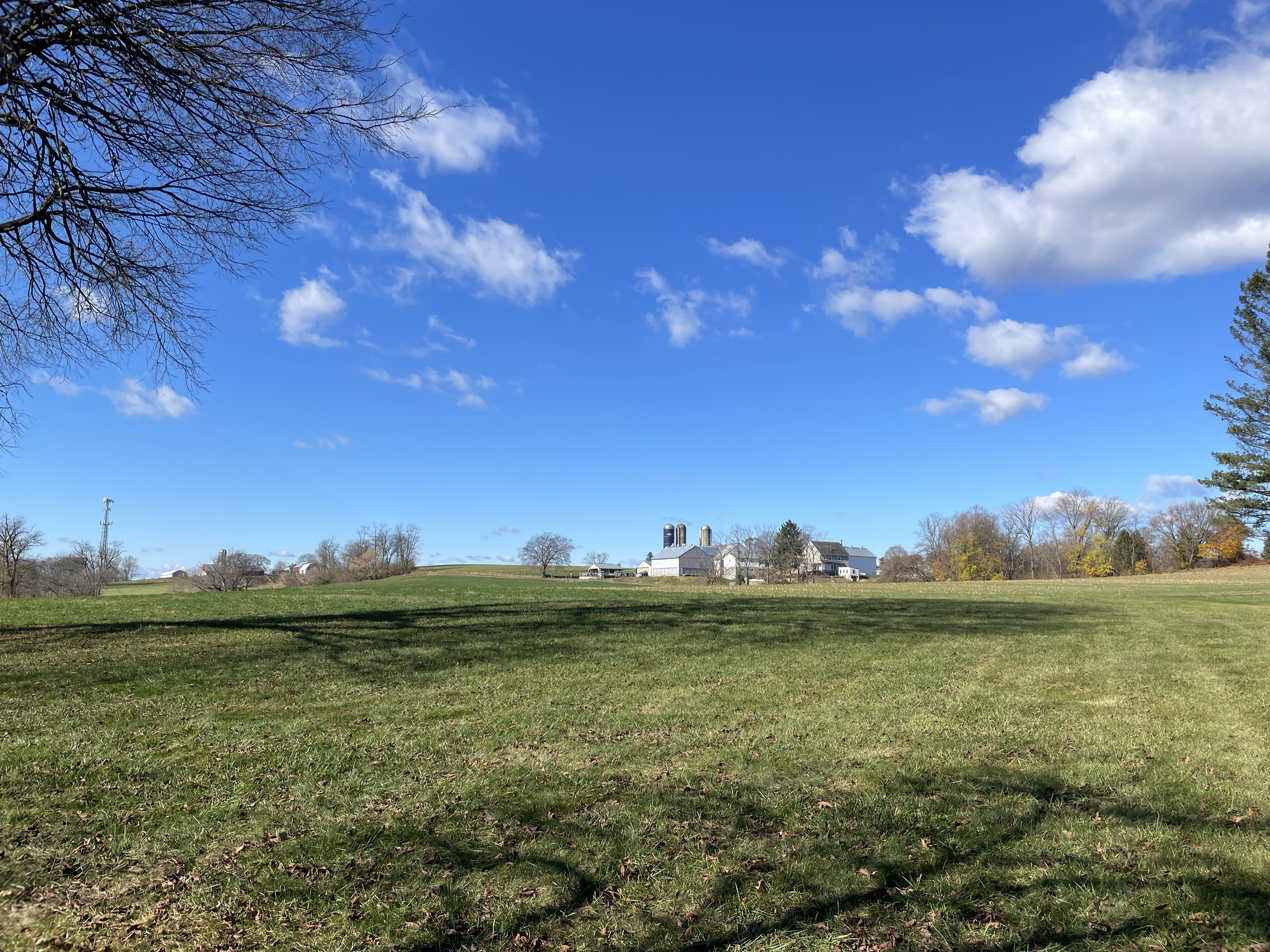
Farmland in East Lampeter Township

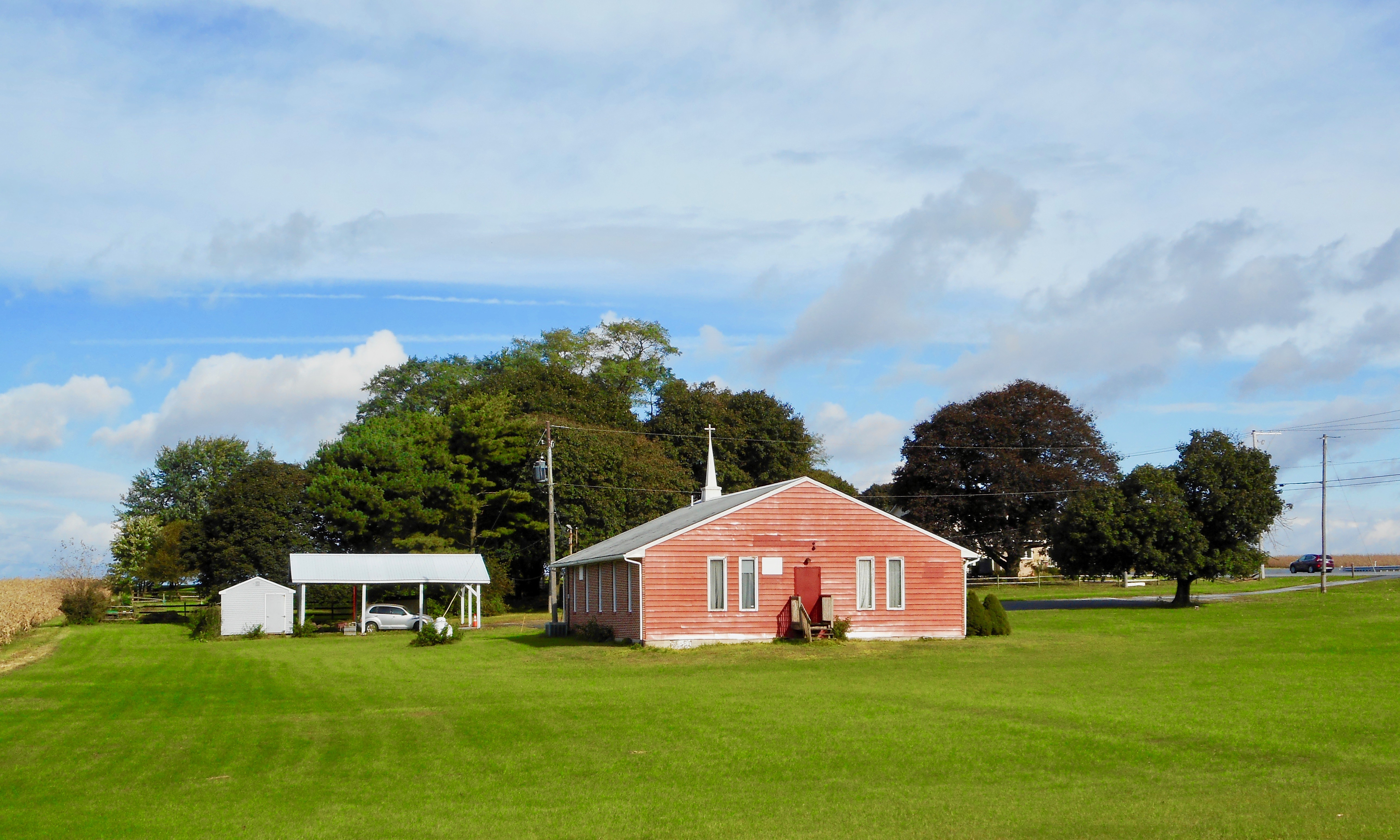
Strasburg Baptist Church

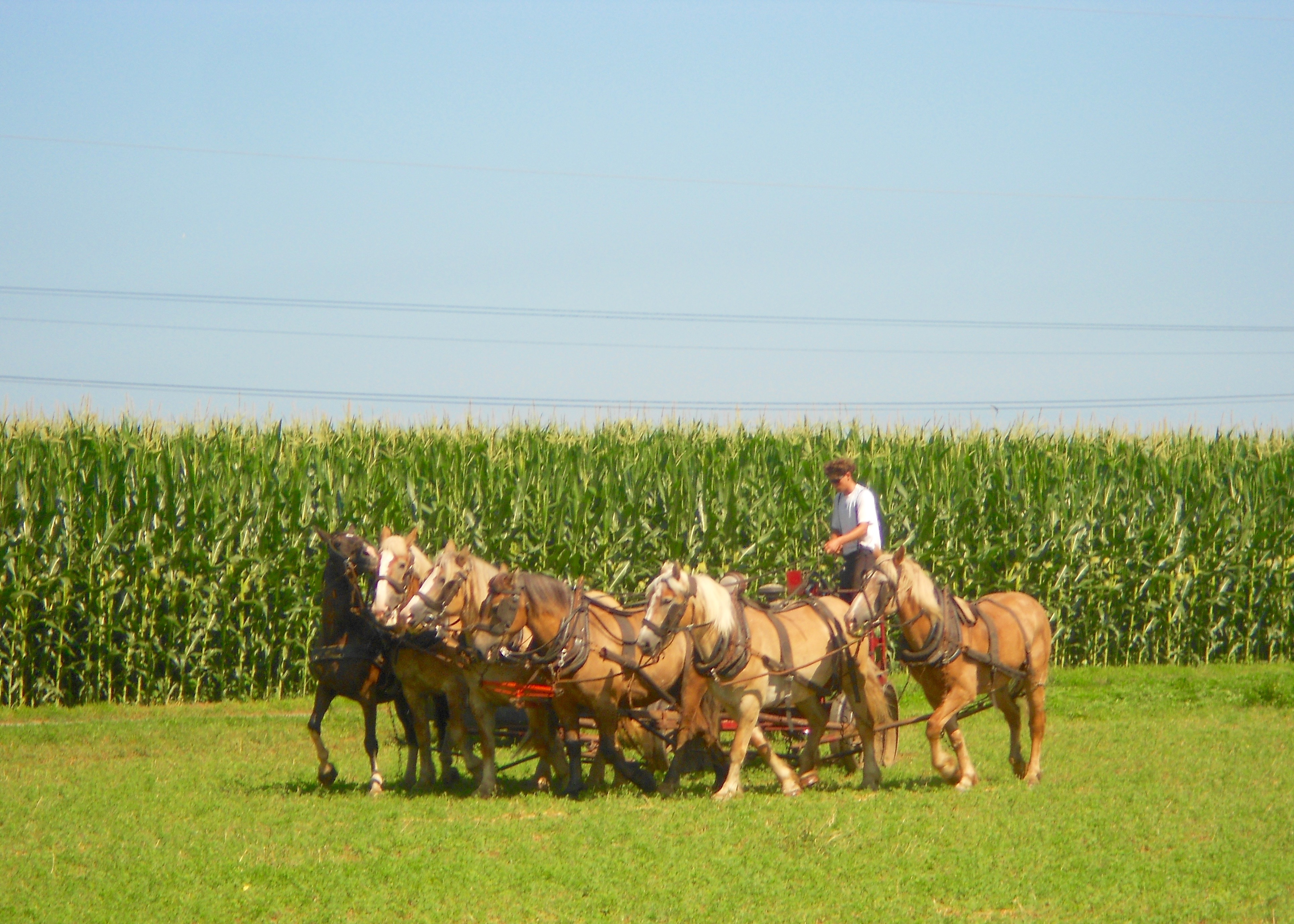
Six horse team mowing hay
