= Gerald Miller (missionary) =

American Mennonite medical missionary (born 1937)

Gerald L. Miller (born 1937) is an American Mennonite medical missionary who worked with the Eastern Mennonite Missions board to save hundreds of lives in Somalia in the years 1971–1972. Miller also found himself convicted and later acquitted of the murder of a government official in a high-profile case during his time in Somalia.

== Background ==
Miller's background in the Mennonite church influenced his service and played a major role in the murder trial. Miller grew up in Shipshewana, Indiana, United States. There, he learned about his Mennonite faith at his church where they shared some of his relatives' missionary experiences. Miller continued his schooling at Goshen College and later received his doctorate from Indiana School of Medicine.

Miller opened his own medical practice in Markle, Indiana, and started a family with wife Mary. Miller and his family moved to Somalia in 1971. Miller served as a doctor at the Jamama Mennonite Hospital from 1971 to 1972 and lived with his family in Mogadishu, Somalia. While he was there, Miller was the only American doctor in Somalia, and was one of a few non-Somali doctors. During this time, Miller was charged with the murder of Hussein Sadad Hassan. Miller pleaded "not guilty" on August 25, 1971, and was cleared of all charges before he and his family returned to the United States.

Miller also worked with his daughter, Shari Miller Wagner, and wrote A Hundred Camels, published by Cascadia Publishing House in 2009. The book details the time Miller and his family served in Somalia before and during the trial.

In 2015, Miller again worked with his daughter, Shari Miller Wagner, and wrote Making the Rounds, published by BookLocker.com. This book details the experiences Miller had while being the doctor for the small town of Markle, Indiana.

Miller now lives in Westfield, Indiana, with his family and has retired from the medical profession.

== Life in Indiana ==
Early on, missionary-minded relatives began to influence Miller and planted ideas of a greater goal in his mind. These relatives, including Orie O. Miller, Jay Hostetler, and Ernest E. Miller watched Miller as he grew in his faith at Forks Mennonite Church in Lagrange County, Indiana, where he attended with his family. After receiving his high school degree in 1955, Miller studied for four years at Goshen College, a Mennonite school in Indiana. This continuation of his general education and Mennonite education would aid him in his future trip. During the four years spent focusing on a Pre-Med education, Miller met his wife Mary.

Miller married Mary in 1956, just after their first year of college, creating a partnership that would allow Miller to have a greater impact on those he worked with. The wedding was a traditional Mennonite wedding where rings were absent, but the service vows proved untraditional. Mary omitted the word "obey" from her vows, possibly accidentally. During their last three years of college, the young couple planted a church in California, Michigan, starting their focus on evangelism early on. The Miller family welcomed their first child, Shari, 18 months after the wedding. Miller began part-time jobs in order to support the family.

Miller pursued his medical degree, relocating the family and attending the Indiana University School of Medicine. He graduated from medical school in 1964 and followed with his residency in Fort Wayne, Indiana. After his residency, Miller began a family practice in Markle, Indiana. He was joined by two other physicians: Dr. Lee Kinzer and Dr. Vic Binkley. Miller is also credited with creating the first EMS service in Bluffton, IN at Wells Community Hospital in 1969.

Miller and his family received a greater call one day. After much prayer and reflection, the Miller family felt the pull to go to Africa, where they would have the opportunity to spread their faith and help others through the medical knowledge Miller had.

== Trip to Somalia ==
The Eastern Mennonite Mission contacted Miller after a doctor left the Mennonite Sharati Hospital in Tanzania. Although Miller and his family knew nothing about Tanzania or the mission there, they felt as though they could help. Miller would be filling in for one year while the Board searched for a full-time replacement. Miller's extensive training obstetrics, pediatrics, surgeries, and general medicine would serve him well, but he was still unprepared for the variety of tropical diseases that he would encounter. Six weeks after the Millers signed on, the Board changed Miller's assignment to Jamama Hospital in Somalia, a country whose government was not recognized by the United States.

Typically, the missionaries received language training before or during their stay, but the short notice for the Miller family did not allow time for instruction. The Millers were to arrive with no knowledge of the native language.

== Somalia and the Mennonites ==
Miller arrived in 1961, in 1963, the government outlawed the teaching of any religion other than Islam. This led to the exodus of almost all missions in Somalia, save the Mennonites. For this reason, Somalia was underserviced and the need for medical missionaries was great. Only the Mennonites helped to fulfill this need. Mennonite missions would be required to teach the Qur'an in order to maintain their status in Somalia. The Mennonites worked to maintain their place in Somalia by remaining cooperative. They began teaching English in the missions' schools beginning in the 1960s. Somalia did not have its own written language and did not create one until October 1972. On October 21, 1969, Major General Mohamed Siad Barre overtook the existing government. The Mennonite presence in Somalia began in the 1950s and has continued through the Eastern Mennonite Missions and Mennonite Central Committee. When Miller and his family arrived in 1969, there were five stable Mennonite missions in Somalia, and few other missions; Miller was the only American doctor there. These locations included hospitals, boarding schools, and bookstores. Serving in the mission field, however, was sometimes dangerous. Merlin Grove, a white Mennonite missionary in Somalia during the 1960s, was stabbed to death while on duty in Somalia. This frightened some missionaries into leaving, but Miller and his family chose to continue their path.

== Life in Somalia ==
Before arriving in Mogadishu, the Millers left their daughters, Shari and Marlis, and Miller's parents at Rosslyn Academy, a boarding school operated by the Mennonites outside of Nairobi. Miller's parents agreed to teach there for three years. In doing this, the elder Millers allowed Miller to continue on his journey and focus on the road ahead rather than spending his time raising a family. Miller, Mary, and their son, Stephen continued on to Mogadishu, Somalia. Once the Miller family arrived on August 26, 1971, they met with other missionaries in the city of Mogadishu.

Harold Reed, in charge of the Somalia Mennonite Mission at the time, greeted Miller, Mary, and Stephen at the Mogadishu airport. This was not their final destination, however. They traveled on to Jamama, where Chester Kurtz, the Jamama administrator met them to explain their duties.

Mary and Stephen often faced xenophobic sentiments when Miller was away at work. While on their way to the store, little children would sometimes throw stones at the four-year-old and his mom, calling them "infidels." Mary had no defined work responsibilities but focused on raising Stephen and providing an orderly home life for her family.

Miller's primary job responsibility was to manage the Jamama Hospital along with hospital administrator Hassan Nur. Nur worked closely with Miller and the two became good friends. Miller and Nur were not alone, however. They were joined by a team of American and Canadian nurses who worked tirelessly to run the hospital and care for patients. The hospital had 30 beds for patients from around the country. Miller studied tropical diseases, cataract surgery, and leprosy among other things in order to adapt to the needs of the Somalis. He spent his days at the hospital, consulting with patients, performing surgeries, and diagnosing new cases.

== The Case of Hussein Sadad Hassan ==
The night before Miller and his family arrived in Africa, there was a car wreck on the road between Kismayu and Jamama. Four people were in a Toyota that toppled over—two men and two women. The driver, under the influence of alcohol, was unharmed. His passengers suffered from severe, as well as some minor injuries.

Hussein Sadad Hassan, a 46-year-old Somali in a front seat of the car, was the most severely injured passenger. Miller understood immediately after Hassan was admitted to the hospital, that the case would be difficult. Had they been in the United States, it is likely that Miller could have saved Hassan; but under the conditions, his chance of survival was slim. After a few months, Hassan's improvement was minimal. Because Hassan was a government employee, the government took an active interest in his condition and mandated that Miller operate on Hassan's injured femur. Miller performed this surgery on December 14, but due to his weakened state, Hassan's recovery was uncertain. Miller himself had to donate two units of blood because a suitable donor could not be found among Hassan's children.

Hassan died a day and a half after the surgery and his children held a traditional funeral service for him.

== The Murder Trial ==
Only a few weeks after Hassan's death, Miller was greeted at the hospital by a Russian doctor asking for Hassan's hospital records. This visit was followed by one from the prosecutor from Kismayu seeking Miller's license and credentials as a doctor.

While these visits seemed to dissolve into nothing, Miller received a telegram from Kismayu's District Court on March 5. This note provided eight days notice before Miller was to appear in court, but it failed to mention the content of the trial. When Miller and his hospital administrator went to inquire, the judge informed them that Miller was being tried for the murder of Hussein Sadad Hassan. Because the United States government did not officially recognize Somalia, Miller could not turn to an embassy. Instead, he looked to Harold Reed, the Mogadishu mission's administrator.

The trial took place on March 23, 1972, at the District Court in Kismayu. There were three defendants in the trial: Miller, the driver of the car Hassan was in, and Dr. Urquhart (the surgeon who first performed on Hassan). Urquhart and the driver were both represented by the same attorney, while Miller was represented by Hassen Scek Ibraham.

The trial lasted only one day but was hindered by the language barrier. One witness spoke Russian, Miller spoke English, the judge spoke Somali, the legal reference books were in Italian, and the court records were in Arabic. The translations delayed the process and were difficult for Miller to follow as he spoke only one of the five languages.

Ten days after the formal trial, the three defendants returned to hear the judgment. Urquhart and the driver were pronounced innocent of Hassan's murder and Miller was declared guilty. This guilty finding was accompanied by a compensation payment (to Hassan's family) of 100 camels, the typical amount paid for a death, and a three-month stay in jail in Somalia. However, the judge stipulated that if Miller were to continue his work at Jamama and avoid any additional charges, he would not serve the time in jail.

After discussing this with Harold Reed and the Mennonite Board in the United States, Miller consented to accepting the charge. The board would pay the family compensation and he would transfer to a hospital in Uganda for the final part of his yearlong service. The Mennonites, traditionally a peaceful people, would respond in accordance with their desire to be cooperative and maintain good relations with the government.

When Miller visited Hassan's family to pay amount awarded them, however, they refused to accept the court-ordered compensation and instead asked Miller to appeal the court decision. Miller traveled to the court for a third time. A new judge reviewed the case and interviewed Miller. Two weeks later, Miller received a telegram exonerating him from all charges previously brought against him and pronouncing him innocent.

Miller later discovered that the first trial's proceedings were corrupt. Both the judge and the prosecutor were friends of the drunken driver and hoped to place the blame on Miller in order to free their friend. Miller's lawyer Ibraham also revealed to Miller that current Somalia President Siad Barre had asked Ibraham to appeal the case so that Miller could be declared innocent.

Six weeks later, Miller and his family returned to the United States.

== Return to America ==
Miller and his family arrived back in Indiana in 1972, where he returned to his practice. Miller worked to create a long-standing EMT program in Bluffton through the Wells Community Hospital.

Miller and Mary are now retired and have traveled to many other Mennonite missions around the world since their time in Somalia. Shari aided Miller in the editing and writing of his book A Hundred Camels: A Mission Doctor's Sojourn and Murder Trial in Somalia. This book details Miller's time in Africa and his trial. Daughter Shari is now married and works as a poet and editor. Marlis and Stephen continue to be involved in Mennonite missions.

The Jamama Hospital has now been converted into a donkey stable after civil war battles ravaged the country. Although the hospital no longer exists, Miller's contributions to the Somali people are still remembered and the unwarranted 1972 trial will actually provide history with a record of Miller and his positive impact on the country.

== Significance ==
Miller's service in Somalia led to thousands of saved lives and even drew the attention of President Siad Barre. His book has sold around the country and his story is told around the world. His struggles with the murder trial helped to expose corruption in a young government that created a new constitution only a few years later. The Mennonite Mission in Jamama, although no longer present, continued to thrive after Miller's departure and the Mennonites were accepted by the Somali government due to their cooperative nature, as seen in the Miller's murder trial. Miller is remembered by the Eastern Mennonite Missions for his service in Somalia.

Miller also spearheaded the creation of the EMS in Wells County, Indiana, that continues to serve the citizens of Wells County.
