= Garden Spot Village =

Retirement community in New Holland, Pennsylvania

Coordinates: 40.1024°N 76.069°W

Garden Spot Village is a licensed, non-profit, faith-based continuing care retirement community in New Holland, Pennsylvania. The facility is operated by Garden Spot Communities, Inc., a 501(c)(3) not-for-profit corporation, and it provides residential and health-care services for adults ages 55 and above. It employs about 500 staff members, including hospitality, maintenance, administrative and skilled nursing staff.

== History ==
Two Christian businessmen from Lancaster County, Pennsylvania, Victor F. Weaver and Ivan Martin, incorporated Garden Spot Village as a not-for-profit continuing care retirement community on July 26, 1990. Garden Spot Village broke ground in July 1994 and the first residents moved in on February 23, 1996.

== Campus ==
The community is located on a 220-acre (0.89 km^{2}) campus at 433 South Kinzer Avenue in New Holland. The campus includes single family homes, cottages, carriage homes and apartments. As a continuing care retirement community, Garden Spot Village also includes personal care suites, skilled nursing, memory support, adult day services and at-home care.

In December 2016 Garden Spot Village broke ground on the Cooperative Living House, which offers housing for adults 62 and over but does not rely on government subsidies. The home, built through donations and volunteer labor provided by the greater New Holland community, received its first residents in mid-March 2018. The Cooperative Living House was awarded multiple innovation awards in 2018 including the LeadingAge National Award for Innovation and the Senior Housing News Architecture & Design Awards’ “Affordable Housing” award.

Garden Spot Village is home to approximately 1000 residents, with a minimum age requirement of 55. Amenities include a theater, an excellent woodshop, aeroponic greenhouse, train room, and other amenities. Other services, such as laundry and housekeeping are available for a fee.

Garden Spot Village offers on-campus healthcare services, including personal care, memory support, adult day services and personal at-home services. WellSpan Health maintains an outpatient center, the WellSpan Garden Spot Village Health Center, on campus. Health-care services available there include internal medicine, family medicine, obstetrics/gynecology, rehabilitation medicine, cardiology testing, pulmonary and sleep medicine, diagnostic imaging and laboratory services.

== Dedicated to Care ==
Garden Spot Village is committed to excellence. In 2025, they received the top rating in the nation by US News and World Report for Continuing Care Retirement Communities. In 2024, Garden Spot Village was ranked 2nd nationally and number 1 in Pennsylvania by US News and World Report. This includes being ranked as one of the best nursing homes in Pennsylvania for 2024.

== Technological Advancement ==
Garden Spot Village is a catalyst of innovation, including working with Composure for the sleep blanket and working with the SoundBlanket

== Affiliations ==
Garden Spot Village is affiliated with the Lancaster Mennonite Conference of the Mennonite Church, the Atlantic Coast Conference of Mennonite Church USA, Mennonite Health Services, LeadingAge and LeadingAge PA.
