= Ethnic Mennonite =

People who participate in aspects of Mennonite culture

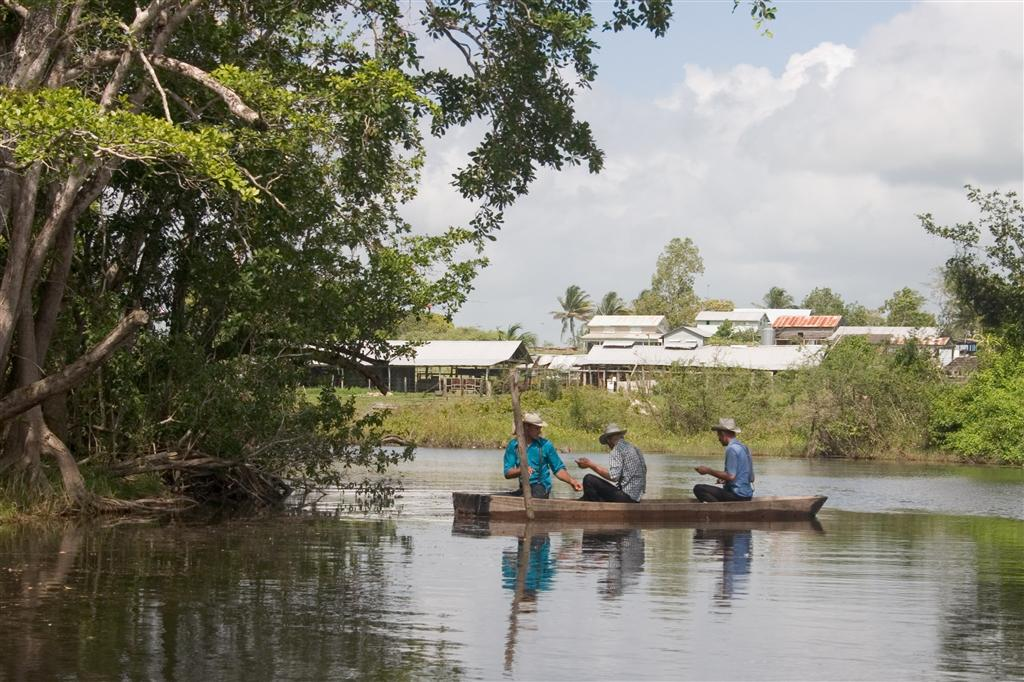
Mennonites in Belize

Ethnic Mennonites are an ethnic or ethnoreligious group descended from Mennonites in various locations, ultimately tracing back to peoples of Western Europe speaking Dutch, Frisian, and Low German. Mennonite is also used for aspects of their culture, such as language, dress, and Mennonite food.

== History ==
The most prominent ethnic Mennonite groups are Russian Mennonites (German: Russland-Mennoniten), who formed as an ethnic group in Prussia and South Russia (now Ukraine), but who are mostly of Dutch (both Flemish and Frisian) and North German ancestry and speak Plautdietsch and Mennonites of Pennsylvania Dutch heritage who formed as an ethnic group in North America and who are of Swiss-German and South German ancestry.

For centuries, Mennonites almost exclusively married inside their churches, and moved through Europe and into North America in large groups, while maintaining their own language and religious practices. They emerged as distinct ethnic groups in Russia around 1789 and in North America around the 1730s. Many still speak those languages today: Pennsylvania German and Plautdietsch.

While missionary activities after 1950s, converted thousands to the Mennonite church in Africa, India, Indonesia and other places outside Europe and North America, these groups cannot be considered ethnic Mennonites as they do not share the same European heritage. In 2012, the Mennonite World Conference estimated that the majority of people attending Mennonite churches were not of Central European or Eastern European heritage anymore.

Some conservative strains of Mennonites, like the Old Order Mennonites and the Old Colony Mennonites have kept their languages, traditional customs and the practice of endogamy to this day, so that they are considered to be ethnic or ethnoreligious groups. The same is true for the Hutterites and the Amish who are Anabaptists like the Mennonites, but have never engaged in mission activities on a larger scale.

Since most religious Mennonites today do not belong to either Russian Mennonite or Pennsylvania Dutch heritage, discussions have arisen around what the Mennonite identity means. Some see the term "ethnic Mennonite" as unnecessary, believing that the only requirement needed to qualify someone as Mennonite is baptism as an adult into the Mennonite church.

That argument, however, fails to see a distinction between religious Mennonites and ethnic Mennonites, and denies the experience and identity of thousands of people in North America, Mexico, Belize, Paraguay, and elsewhere, who share a common Mennonite heritage.

While many ethnic Mennonites have assimilated into Western culture, and adopted English as their primary language, their heritage and their family names continue to distinguish them as ethnically Mennonites to other ethnic Mennonites, who are proud of their heritage and make a point of knowing who all their relatives are. This is affectionately referred to as the Mennonite Game.

Many ethnic Mennonites, would also consider themselves non-practicing, further demonstrating the need to distinguish between ethnic Mennonites and religious Mennonites, and highlighting the complications of ethnoreligious identity.

== See also ==
- Anabaptist settler colonialism
- Black Mennonites

== Literature ==
- Francis, E. K. "The Russian Mennonites: From Religious to Ethnic Group." American Journal of Sociology Vol. 54, No. 2 (Sep., 1948), pp. 101–107.
- Loewen, Royden. "The Poetics of Peoplehood: Ethnicity and Religion among Canada's Mennonites," in Paul Bramadat and David Seljak, Christianity and Ethnicity in Canada, University of Toronto Press, 2008.
- Redekop, John H. A People Apart: Ethnicity and the Mennonite Brethren, Hillsboro, KS: Kindred Press, 1987.
