= Michael Dohner Farmhouse =

Historic house in Pennsylvania, United States

- U.S. National Register of Historic Places
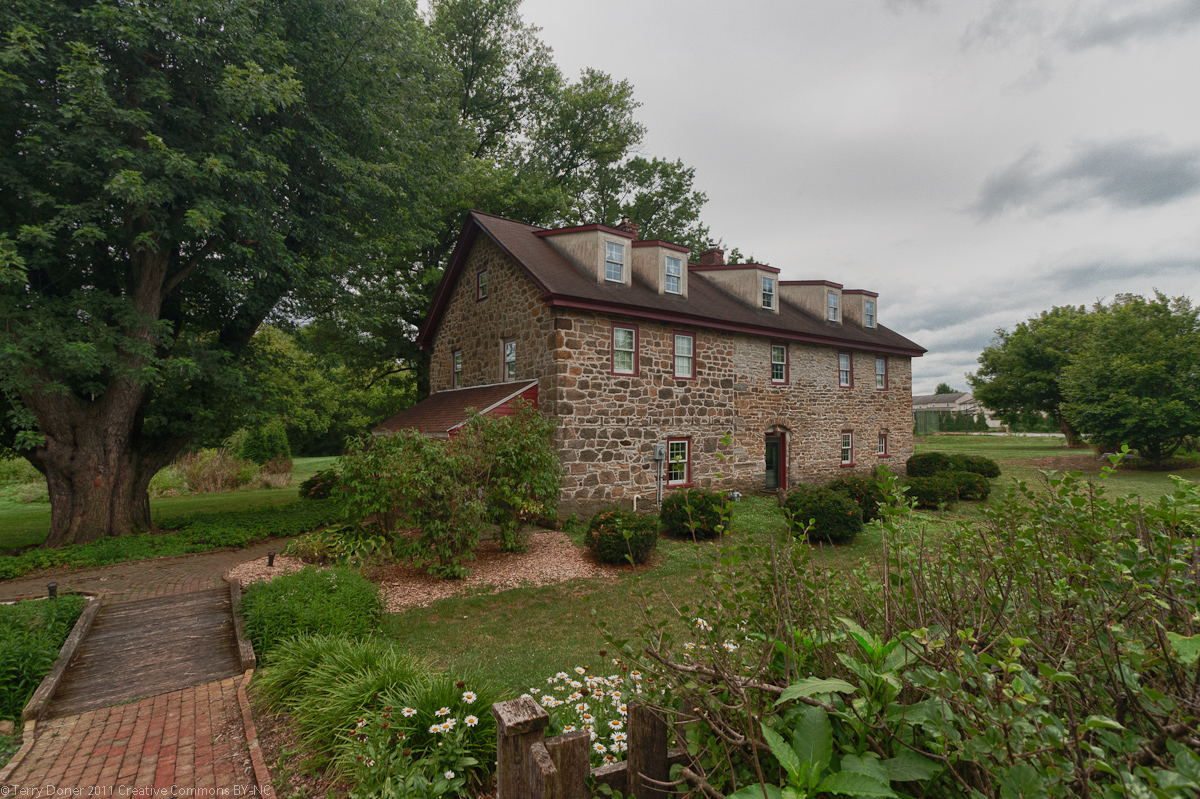
- View looking toward the south west

- Location within Pennsylvania Location within the United States
- Location: South of U.S. Route 30, east of the intersection with Pennsylvania Route 896, East Lampeter Township, Pennsylvania
- Coordinates: 40°1′39″N 76°13′49″W
- Area: 0.4 acres (0.16 ha)
- Built: c. 1732
- Built by: Michael Dohner
- Architectural style: Continental
- NRHP reference No.: 80003523
- Added to NRHP: June 27, 1980

Michael Dohner Farmhouse is a historic home located at East Lampeter Township, Lancaster County, Pennsylvania. It is a two-story, fieldstone dwelling, five bays long and two bays deep. The original section was built about 1732, in a configuration typical of a German continental house. It features a massive interior fireplace.

It was listed on the National Register of Historic Places in 1980.
