= Christian Stauffer House =

Historic house in Pennsylvania, United States

- U.S. National Register of Historic Places
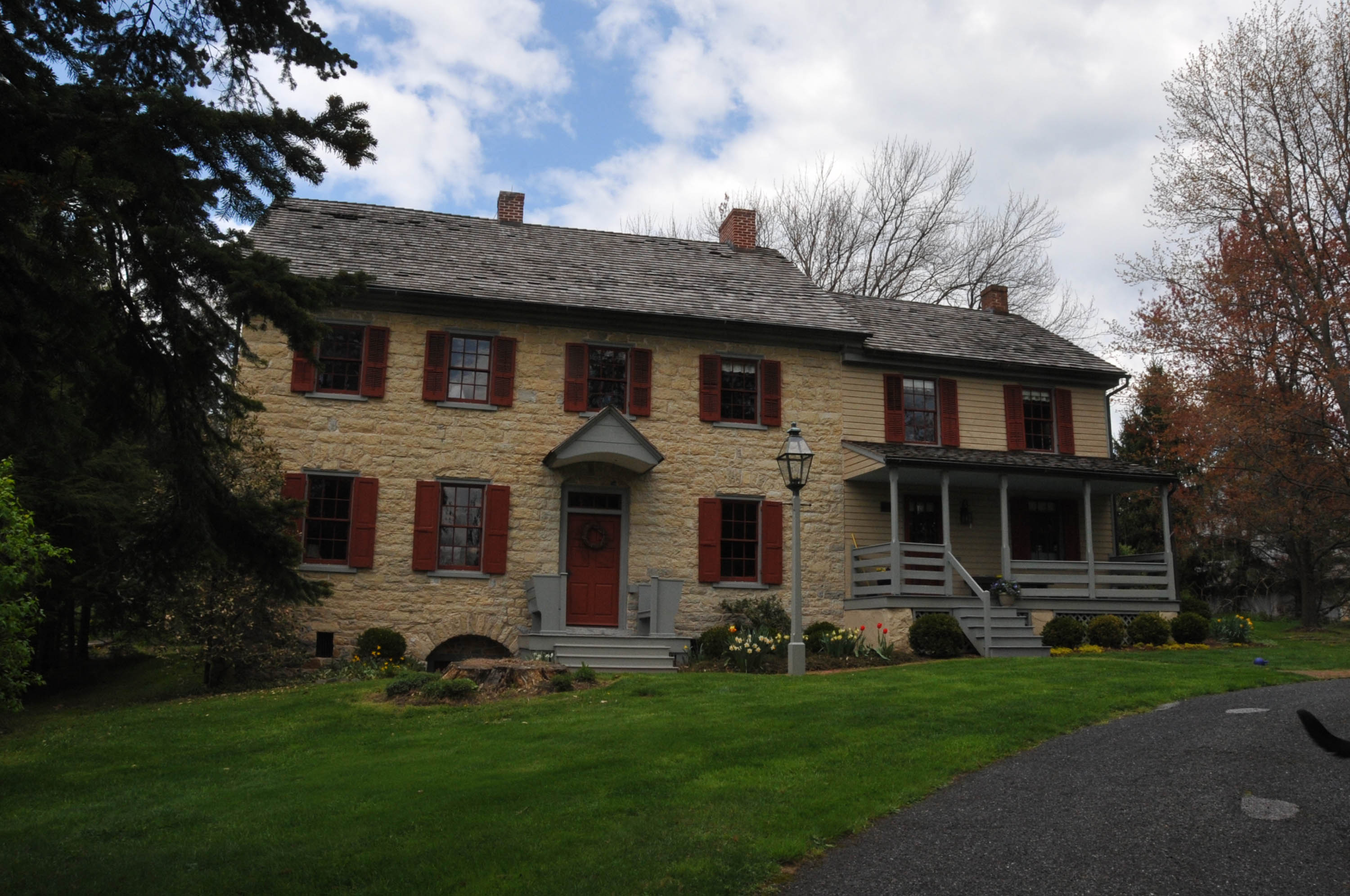

- Location within Pennsylvania Location within the United States
- Location: Millcross Rd., East Lampeter Township, Pennsylvania
- Coordinates: 40°03′36″N 76°15′17″W
- Area: 5 acres (2.0 ha)
- Built: 1769, 1890s
- Architectural style: Pennsylvania-Germanic style
- NRHP reference No.: 86002889
- Added to NRHP: October 16, 1986

Christian Stauffer House is a historic home located at East Lampeter Township, Lancaster County, Pennsylvania. It was built in 1769, and is a two-story, four bay limestone dwelling, in a melded Pennsylvania-German and Anglo-American Georgian style. It has a two-story, two bay frame addition on a stone foundation built in the 1890s. Also on the property are a contributing late-18th century bank barn, stone and frame summer kitchen, and late-19th century carriage house.

It was listed on the National Register of Historic Places in 1986.
