= Alliance of Mennonite Evangelical Congregations =

The Alliance of Mennonite Evangelical Congregations (AMEC) is an association of conservative evangelical Mennonite churches. The organization was officially formed in 2002 over concerns relating to the merger of the Mennonite Church and the General Conference Mennonite Church.

As a denomination, AMEC positions itself a voluntary association of congregations which maintain a common two-fold commitment "both to the doctrinal foundation of evangelical orthodoxy and to the worthy tenets of historic biblical Anabaptism."

Menno Simons

== Background ==
The founding of the AMEC was the culmination of a movement to renew the 16th century Anabaptist emphasis on evangelism, coupled with concerns over doctrinal compromise and the upcoming merger of the Mennonite Church and the General Conference Mennonite Church. A consultation of evangelical Mennonite leaders was held at Smoketown, Pennsylvania, in July 1979. Out of this meeting came a declaration called the "Smoketown Statement". It called for "a reaffirmation of the authority of Scripture, a reexamination of priorities with emphasis on the saving power of the Gospel, and a clear call for renewed emphasis on evangelism." This was followed by another consultation held in Berne, Indiana, in March 1981. In 1992 this evangelical group organized the Evangelical Anabaptist Fellowship, and began publishing an EAF Newsletter.

As the merger of the Mennonite Church and the General Conference Mennonite Church developed, they jointly adopted a new Confession of Faith as the basis of the merger. Members of the EAF believed that portions of the confession were left deliberately ambiguous, especially concerning the infallibility of the Scriptures. Other controversial issues included whether the new confession was merely a guideline or a definitive statement to which leadership would be expected to adhere in guiding the new denomination, and whether certain behaviors were to be prohibited to those who are members of the church. Some evangelical Mennonites felt that discussion of doctrinal issues was downplayed in order to promote unity and merger.

A meeting representing 24 churches from four states was convened on February 12, 2000, at Smoketown, Pennsylvania. Representatives concluded that "in light of the formation of the new Mennonite Church USA and its departure from Biblical orthodoxy, we believe God is calling us to form a new affiliation of evangelical Anabaptist congregations." The EAF Board of Directors appointed a committee to make recommendations on how to proceed. Early in 2000, Association of Evangelical Mennonite Congregations was adopted as the tentative name of the organization, and the move toward organization was affirmed. On September 30, 2000, at a meeting in Lancaster County, Pennsylvania, the first congregation committed to affiliate with the proposed organization. Soon after this, seven other congregations also committed to affiliate with the association. On June 19, 2002, bylaws were drafted. They were adopted on September 28, 2002. The name was changed to Alliance of Mennonite Evangelical Congregations.

== Status ==
Membership in this new body, according to the bylaws, is open to any congregation that "endorses the Purposes and Principles", and "affirms the Statement of Doctrine". Individuals whose local congregation is not affiliated with the AMEC can apply for "Associate Membership" under the same conditions.

At the end of 2003, 16 congregations in Pennsylvania and New York were part of the Alliance of Mennonite Evangelical Congregations, representing possibly 2000 individual believers. Some of the congregations are dually aligned with the AMEC and the Mennonite Church USA. In the fall of 2003, they launched a quarterly publication, InterLink, which is available on their website or by mail. Currently offices are in Paradise, Pennsylvania. The Alliance conference and general assembly is held biennially. The body is committed to providing fellowship for evangelical Mennonites throughout North America.

As of 2016, 28 Congregations were affiliated with AMEC. Most were in Pennsylvania, but Oklahoma, New York, and Delaware were also represented. The Mennonite World Conference counted 2889 baptized members in 28 congregations belonging to the AMEC in their 2015 census.

== Faith and practice ==
Beliefs include: the Bible as the inspired infallible word of God; the eternal existence of God in three persons; the virgin birth, sinless life, miracles, vicarious atonement, bodily resurrection, ascension, present intercession, and personal return of Jesus; mankind's fall and the need of salvation; the sanctity of human life; marriage between one man and one woman; the doctrine of non-resistance; and the resurrection of all people to either eternal happiness or eternal separation from God. While anointing with oil, prayer for the sick, feet washing, and the devotional head covering are affirmed by most churches, the AMEC recognizes two ordinances — believers baptism and the Lord's supper — as distinct from these other practices.

Local congregations are independent and autonomous, but the AMEC believes this does not "…imply autonomy from the Authority of Scripture and its clear teachings…".
