= Lancaster Mennonite Conference =

- Classification: Protestant
- Orientation: Mennonite
- Polity: Presbyterian
- Distinct fellowships: Mennonite Church USA (2002-2015)
- Associations: Mennonite World Conference; Eastern Mennonite Missions
- Region: North America
- Origin: 1711; Lancaster County, Province of Pennsylvania
- Congregations: 179 (2018)
- Members: 15,357 (2018)
- Official website: https://lmcchurches.org/

Lancaster Mennonite Conference (LMC) is a historic body of Mennonite churches mainly concentrated in the Mid-Atlantic region of the United States. While including churches in other regions of the United States, it also has congregations in Mexico, Central America, and the Caribbean. The conference was briefly (2002-2015) associated with the newly formed Mennonite Church USA (MC USA). The LMC has been a member of the Mennonite World Conference since 2018.

== Organization ==
The churches of the Lancaster Mennonite Conference (LMC) make up 24 districts including: Bowmansville-Reading, Elizabethtown, Ephrata, Groffdale, Harrisburg, Juniata, Lancaster, Landisville, Lebanon, Lititz, Manheim, Manor, Martindale, Mellinger, Millwood, New Danville, New York City, North Penn, Pequea Valley, Philadelphia, Washington-Baltimore, Weaverland-Northeast Pennsylvania, Williamsport-Milton, Willow Street-Strasburg, and York-Adams Districts.

The conference office is located in Lancaster, Pennsylvania. The Bishop Board, a collection of all the bishops from the districts in the Conference, is the executive board of the Lancaster Mennonite Conference. The Conference Leadership Assembly, composed of all bishops, ministers, deacons, deaconesses, and chaplains in the Conference, is the governing body of Lancaster Mennonite Conference.

Lancaster Mennonite Conference publishes a magazine Shalom News, and oversees several agencies, including Eastern Mennonite Missions, Friendship Community, Lancaster Mennonite Historical Society, Lancaster Mennonite School, Landis Homes, Philhaven, and Sharing Programs.

== History ==
The Lancaster Mennonite Conference first convened in 1711, only a few months after the Swiss-Palatine immigrants had established themselves in what is now Lancaster County. In 1725, five representatives, Martin Baer, Hans Burkholtzer, Christian Herr, Benedikt Hirsche, and Johannes Bowman, attended the first general Mennonite Conference when the Dordrecht Confession was translated into English.

Additional Mennonite immigrants joined the settlement in 1711, 1717, 1727, and at later periods. It is estimated that by 1735 over five hundred families had emigrated from Switzerland and the Palatinate and settled in Lancaster County. They overflowed into what are now neighboring counties and established daughter colonies in Maryland, Virginia, New York, Canada, and Ohio.

The Mellinger meetinghouse was home to semiannual conferences each fall and at one of the three Rohrerstown meetinghouses every spring as far back as records exist, around 1740. But beginning in 1953, the spring meeting was moved to East Petersburg Mennonite Church. It was at this conference that decisions were made and either approved or rejected.

In the 1940s, missionaries from the LMC traveled to Ethiopia. This mission led to the founding of the Meserete Kristos Church, which is the largest Mennonite denomination in Ethiopia and one of the largest in the world with over 300,000 members.

Expansion and growth led to differences of opinion within the conference. In 1960, nine ordained men withdrew from the conference to form the Mennonite Christian Brotherhood. Differences over issues related to divorce and remarriage, television, and relaxed dress requirements resulted in the formation of the Eastern Pennsylvania Mennonite Church in 1969. Two hundred members left in 1975 to form the Conservative Mennonite Churches of York and Adams Counties, Pennsylvania.

As of 2018, the LMC had 15,357 members in 179 congregations.

As of 2026, LMC had 25,000 members in 312 congregations. LMC churches worship in 18 different languages.

=== Affiliations ===
In 1971, after repeated invitations, the Lancaster Mennonite Conference joined the Mennonite Church (MC), sometimes known as the "Old" Mennonite Church. The conference reorganized to more closely follow the structure of the Mennonite Church in 1977.

After five years of provisional membership, Lancaster Mennonite Conference joined Mennonite Church USA (MC USA) as a full member in 2006. MC USA was a merger of the (Old) Mennonite Church and the General Conference Mennonite Church, which occurred in 2001.

On November 19, 2015, citing a "cultural and theological divide" over MC USA's increasing support for same-sex marriage and LGBTQ relationships, a proposal by the Board of Bishops to leave MC USA was ratified by 82.3% of those voting. The withdrawal was effective immediately and to be finalized by congregations on or before the end of 2017, but allowed individual congregations an option of continued participation with MC USA, if so desired. At the time, the conference had 13,838 members in 163 congregations. Most congregations opted to exit the Mennonite Church USA, leaving only 1,091 members from Lancaster Mennonite Conference remaining with the MC USA.

In 2018, the LMC was accepted as a full member of the Mennonite World Conference. The LMC is also associated with the Eastern Mennonite Missions.

=== Ordination of women ===
While some congregations continue to reserve leadership roles for men, LMC network ordains women for ministry and includes women in top leadership roles.

== See also ==
- Garden Spot Village
