= Vincent Harding =

American historian and pastor

The Reverend Vincent Harding
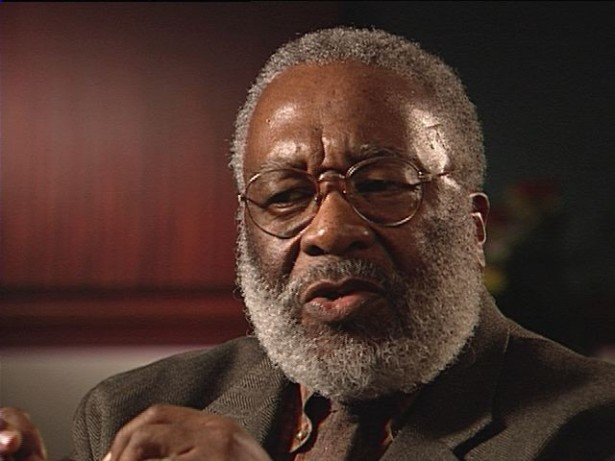
- Born: Vincent Gordon Harding; July 25, 1931; New York City, New York, U.S.
- Died: May 19, 2014 (aged 82); Philadelphia, Pennsylvania, U.S.
- Education: City College of New York (BA); Columbia University (MS); University of Chicago (MA, PhD)
- Occupations: Pastor; historian; activist
- Notable work: "Beyond Vietnam" (1967); There Is a River (1981)
- Movement: Civil rights movement
- Spouses: Rosemarie Freeney (m. 1960; died 2004); Aljosie Aldrich Harding

Scholarly background
- Doctoral advisor: Martin E. Marty

Scholarly work
- Discipline: History
- Institutions: Spelman College; Martin Luther King Jr. Memorial Center; Institute of the Black World; Iliff School of Theology

Vincent Gordon Harding (July 25, 1931 – May 19, 2014) was an African-American pastor, historian, and scholar of various topics with a focus on American religion and society. A social activist, he was perhaps best known for his work with and writings about Martin Luther King Jr., whom Harding knew personally. Besides having authored numerous books such as There Is A River, Hope and History, and Martin Luther King: The Inconvenient Hero, he served as co-chairperson of the social unity group Veterans of Hope Project and as Professor of Religion and Social Transformation at Iliff School of Theology in Denver, Colorado. When Harding died on May 19, 2014, his daughter, Rachel Elizabeth Harding, publicly eulogized him on the Veterans of Hope Project website.

== Education ==
Harding was born on July 25, 1931, in Harlem, New York, and attended New York public schools, graduating from Morris High School in the Bronx in 1948. After finishing high school, he enrolled in the City College of New York, where he received a Bachelor of Arts in history in 1952. The following year he graduated from Columbia University, where he earned a Master of Science degree in journalism. Harding served in the US Army from 1953 to 1955. In 1956 he received a Master of Arts degree in history at the University of Chicago. In 1965 he received his Doctor of Philosophy degree in history from the University of Chicago, where he was advised by Martin E. Marty.

== Career ==
In 1960, Harding and his wife, Rosemarie Freeney Harding, moved to Atlanta, Georgia, to participate in the Southern Freedom Movement as representatives of the Mennonite Church. The Hardings co-founded Mennonite House, an interracial voluntary service center and movement gathering place in Atlanta. The couple traveled throughout the South in the early 1960s working as reconcilers, counselors and participants in the Movement, assisting the anti-segregation campaigns of the Southern Christian Leadership Conference (SCLC), the Student Nonviolent Coordinating Committee (SNCC) and the Congress of Racial Equality (CORE). Vincent Harding occasionally drafted speeches for Martin Luther King Jr., including King's famous anti-Vietnam speech, "A Time to Break Silence", which King delivered on April 4, 1967, at Riverside Church in New York City, exactly a year before he was assassinated.

Harding taught at the University of Pennsylvania, Spelman College, Temple University, Swarthmore College, and Pendle Hill Quaker Center for Study and Contemplation. In the months after King's 1968 assassination, Harding worked with Coretta Scott King to set up the King Center for Nonviolent Social Change in Atlanta, and served as its first director. During those same months in 1968, he worked with a group of scholars to set up Atlanta's Institute of the Black World. He also became senior academic consultant for the PBS television series Eyes on the Prize.

Harding served as chairperson of the Veterans of Hope Project: A Center for the Study of Religion and Democratic Renewal, located at the Iliff School of Theology in Denver, Colorado. He taught at Iliff as Professor of Religion and Social Transformation from 1981 to 2004.

== Beliefs and activism ==
Harding was a devout Christian and believer in achieving racial and economic equality in the United States. Harding was a Seventh-day Adventist pastor before becoming a Mennonite pastor.

In January 2005, Harding remarked at the Christian liberal arts university Goshen College:

There's a lesson for us: If we lock up Martin Luther King, and make him unavailable for where we are now so we can keep ourselves comfortably distant from the realities he was trying to grapple with, we waste King. All of us are being called beyond those comfortable places where it's easy to be Christian. That's the key for the 21st century – to answer the voice within us, as it was within Martin, which says 'do something for somebody.' We can learn to play on locked pianos and to dream of worlds that do not yet exist.

== Writings ==
- There Is a River: The Black Struggle for Freedom in America. New York: Harcourt Brace Jovanovich; 1981. ISBN 9780151893423
- Introduction to How Europe Underdeveloped Africa, by Walter Rodney, Howard University Press, 1981. editor Gregory S. Kearse. ISBN 9780882580968
- We Must Keep Going: Martin Luther King and the Future of America. Philadelphia: Temple University, Institute of African and African-American Affairs, Dept. of African-American Studies; 1987. OCLC 78338558
- Hope and History: Why We Must Share the Story of the Movement. Maryknoll, NY: Orbis Books; 1990. ISBN 9780883446645
- A Certain Magnificence: Lyman Beecher and the Transformation of American Protestantism, 1775–1863 (Chicago Studies in the History of American Religion). Brooklyn, N.Y: Carlson; 1991. ISBN 9780926019430
- Foreword to Wade in the Water: The Wisdom of the Spirituals, by Arthur C. Jones. Maryknoll, NY: Orbis Books; 1993. ISBN 9780883449233
- Martin Luther King: The Inconvenient Hero. Maryknoll, NY: Orbis Books; 1996. ISBN 9781570750649
- Foreword to Jesus and the Disinherited, by Howard Thurman (Beacon Press, 1996). ISBN 9780807010297
- We Changed the World: African Americans, 1945–1970 (The Young Oxford History of African Americans, V. 9) Oxford University Press; 1997. ISBN 9780195087963
- Introduction to Where Do We Go From Here: Chaos or Community Boston: Beacon Press, re-released 2010. ISBN 9780807000762
- Chapter 1 Widening the Circle: Experiments in Christian Discipleship. Scottdale: MennoMedia; 2011. ISBN 9780836197006
- America Will Be! Conversations on Hope, Freedom, and Democracy with Daisaku Ikeda (Dialogue Path Press, 2013) ISBN 9781887917100
- L'espoir de la démocratie, by Vincent Harding and Daisaku Ikeda (In French), (L'Harmattan, 2017, ISBN 978-2-343-11268-8)
- African-American Christianity: Essays in History. Berkeley: University of California Press; 2024. ISBN 9780520911772

== See also ==
- African-American history
- Black Mennonites

== Sources ==
- Harding biography from Berkshire Publishing
- Harding biography from the Martin Luther King, Jr. Research and Education Institute at Stanford University
- Harding biography from Shift In Action (Institute of Noetic Sciences)
- Harding biography from Emory University
- Harding biography from the Iliff School of Theology
- "I've Known Rivers: The story of freedom movement leaders Rosemarie Freeney Harding and Vincent Harding" from Sojourners Magazine
