= Central Plains Mennonite Conference =

Central Plains Mennonite Conference logo.

The Central Plains Mennonite Conference, based in Freeman, South Dakota, is a division of the Mennonite Church USA made up of 53 churches in Colorado, Illinois, Iowa, Minnesota, Montana, Nebraska, North Dakota, South Dakota, and Wisconsin.

The Northern District Conference of the former General Conference Mennonite Church and Iowa-Nebraska Conference of the former Mennonite Church merged to form Central Plains Mennonite Conference in 2000. Five churches located in Iowa that were members of the Central District Conference voted to join Central Plains Mennonite Conference at the same time.

Among the symbols in the logo are a Native American peace pipe, representing unity among the different communities that make up the conference; a towel and basin, representing the Mennonite practice of service; and a pitcher representing believer's baptism and the outpouring of the Holy Spirit.
