= Mennonite Church USA =

American Anabaptist Christian denomination

- Abbreviation: MC USA
- Classification: Mainline Anabaptist
- Theology: Mennonite
- Polity: Congregational
- Moderator: Marty Lehman
- Associations: Mennonite World Conference Christian Churches Together
- Region: United States
- Headquarters: Mennonite Church USA has offices in Elkhart, Indiana, and Newton, Kansas.
- Origin: February 1, 2002
- Merger of: The Mennonite Church and the General Conference Mennonite Church
- Congregations: 530 (2025)
- Members: 50,000 (2025)
- Missionary organization: Mennonite Mission Network
- Official website: mennoniteusa.org

The Mennonite Church USA (MC USA) is a Mennonite Christian denomination in the United States. Although the organization is a recent 2002 merger of the Mennonite Church and the General Conference Mennonite Church, the body has roots in the Radical Reformation of the 16th century.

According to a census published by the association in 2025, it would have 50,000 baptized members in 530 churches.

== History ==
=== Mennonite Church (MC) (Mennonite General Conference and Mennonite General Assembly) ===
The church has its origins in the establishment of the first Mennonite church by German migrants in Germantown, Philadelphia in 1683.Swiss Mennonites came to North America in the early part of the 18th century. Their first settlements were in Pennsylvania, then in Virginia and Ohio. These Swiss immigrants, combined with Dutch and German Mennonites and progressive Amish Mennonites who later united with them, until 2002 made up the largest body of Mennonites in North America (in the past often referred to as the "Old Mennonites"). They formed regional conferences in the 18th century. As early as 1725, delegates from various Pennsylvania Mennonite settlements met to adopt the Dordrecht Confession of Faith as their official statement of faith. The "Old" Mennonite Church was marked by ties of communion, pulpit exchange, and common confession, rather than formal organizational ties. Many, but not all, of the conferences joined the North American conference, the Mennonite General Conference, in 1898. The Mennonite General Conference was reorganized in 1971 as the Mennonite General Assembly. The Mennonite General Assembly merged with the General Conference Mennonite Church in 2002.

=== General Conference Mennonite Church (GCMC) ===
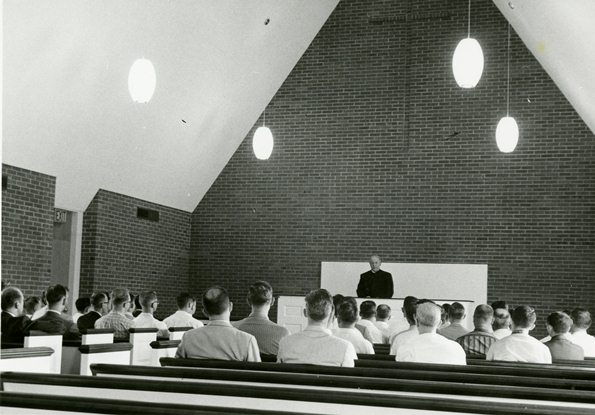
Photograph of Mennonite General Conference (1927–1959), preserved at the Mennonite Church USA Archives in Goshen, Indiana.

The General Conference Mennonite Church was an association of Mennonite congregations located in North America from 1860 to 2002. The conference was formed in 1860 by congregations in Iowa seeking to unite with like-minded Mennonites to pursue common goals such as higher education and mission work. The conference was especially attractive to recent Mennonite and Amish immigrants to North America and expanded considerably when thousands of Russian Mennonites arrived in North America starting in the 1870s. Conference offices were located in Winnipeg, Manitoba and North Newton, Kansas. The conference supported a seminary and several colleges. By the 1980s, there remained little difference between the General Conference Mennonite Church and many conferences in the Mennonite General Assembly. In the 1990s the conference had 64,431 members in 410 congregations in Canada, the United States and South America.

=== Merger ===
In 1983 the General Assembly of the Mennonite Church met jointly with the General Conference Mennonite Church in Bethlehem, Pennsylvania, in celebration of 300 years of Mennonite witness in the Americas. Beginning in 1989, a series of consultations, discussions, proposals, and sessions (and a vote in 1995 in favor of merger) led to the unification of these two major North American Mennonite bodies into one denomination organized on two fronts – the Mennonite Church USA and the Mennonite Church Canada. The merger was "finalized" at a joint session in St. Louis, Missouri, in 1999, and the Canadian branch moved quickly ahead. The United States branch did not complete their organization until the meeting in Nashville, Tennessee, in 2001, which became effective February 1, 2002.

The merger of 1999-2002 at least partially fulfilled the desire of the founders of the General Conference Mennonite Church to create an organization under which all Mennonites could unite. Yet not all Mennonites favored the merger. The Alliance of Mennonite Evangelical Congregations represents one expression of the disappointment with the merger and the events that led up to it.

=== Conservative exodus ===
Since its merger, a large number of conservative congregations have left Mennonite Church USA. 2013 saw nine congregations leave, and in 2014 at least 12 did so. In November 2015, the Lancaster Conference, Mennonite Church USA's largest conference, with 13,838 members in 163 congregations in six states plus the District of Columbia, voted in majority to leave the denomination by the end of 2017.

By early 2016 the membership had decreased to 78,892 members. This decline was generally attributed to the denomination's increasingly progressive position towards same sex marriage, among other issues, which caused many congregations to leave Mennonite Church USA. In April 2016, the Franklin Mennonite Conference, a conference with 14 congregations and about 1,000 members in Pennsylvania and Maryland, voted to withdraw from the Mennonite Church USA.

According to a census published by the association in 2025, it would have 50,000 baptized members in 530 churches.

== Structure ==
=== Convention and delegate assembly ===
Every other year, Mennonite Church USA holds a week-long, church-wide convention. The convention includes gatherings for adults, youth, junior youth and children (K-5, Preschool and Infants/Toddlers). During the convention, there are worship sessions, seminars, alumni gatherings, and special dinners. Also, taking place during the convention is the Delegate Assembly. Delegates from local congregations, regional area conferences, and constituency groups gather to develop vision and direction for the national denomination. Previous conventions have been held in Nashville, Tennessee (2001), Atlanta, Georgia (2003), Charlotte, North Carolina (2005), San Jose, California (2007), Columbus, Ohio (2009), Pittsburgh, Pennsylvania (2011), Phoenix, Arizona (2013), Kansas City, Missouri (2015, 2019, 2023), Orlando, Florida (2017), Cincinnati, Ohio (2021), and Greensboro, North Carolina (2025).

=== Area conferences ===
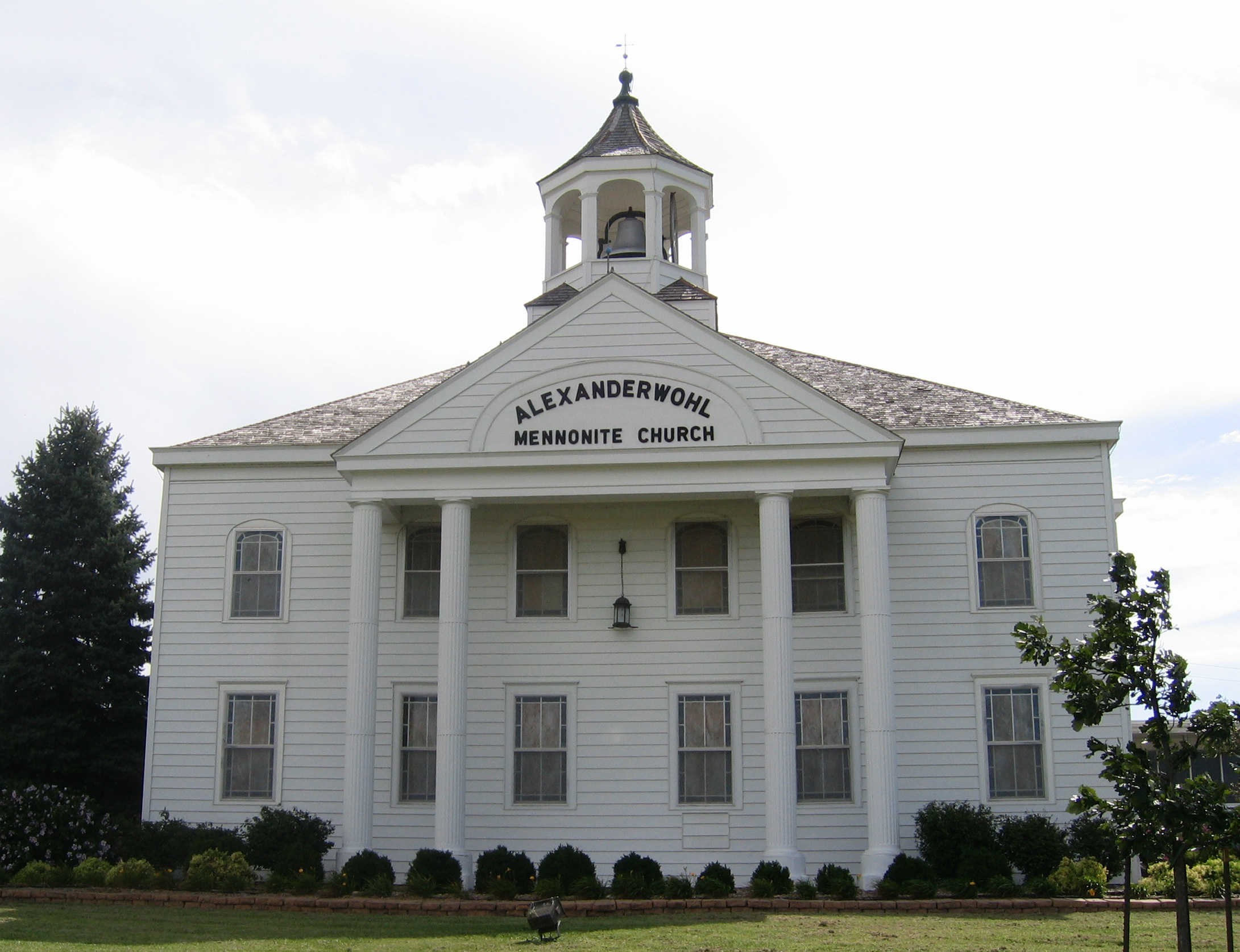
Alexanderwohl Mennonite Church, a Western District Conference congregation

All congregations in the denomination belong to an area conference, and it is the area conference that is the component part of Mennonite Church USA. There are currently 21 area conferences with many of them overlapping geographically due to conference structures prior to the merger. Recently, some divisions have occurred and the Lancaster Conference (not included here) voted in 2015 to leave the Mennonite Church U.S.A. by 2017.

- Allegheny Mennonite Conference
- Atlantic Coast Conference
- Central District Conference
- Central Plains Mennonite Conference
- Eastern District Conference
- Franklin Mennonite Conference
- Gulf States Mennonite Conference
- Illinois Mennonite Conference
- Indiana-Michigan Mennonite Conference
- Mountain States Mennonite Conference
- New York Mennonite Conference
- North Central Conference of the Mennonite Church
- Ohio Conference of the Mennonite Church
- Pacific Northwest Mennonite Conference
- Pacific Southwest Mennonite Conference
- South Central Mennonite Conference
- Southeast Mennonite Conference
- Virginia Mennonite Conference
- Western District Conference

=== Agencies ===
Mennonite Church USA maintains five church-wide ministry agencies: Mennonite Mission Network, Mennonite Education Agency, MennoMedia (formerly Mennonite Publishing Network), Mennonite Health Services, and Everence (formerly Mennonite Mutual Aid).

=== Mennonite Education Agency ===
The mission of Mennonite Education Agency (MEA) is to strengthen the life, witness and identity of Mennonite Church USA through education. MEA helps provide leadership to Mennonite Schools Council, elementary and secondary schools throughout the United States, Puerto Rico, and Canada. MEA also helps bring support and leadership to Mennonite colleges, universities, and seminaries located throughout the United States. It also works with various people and groups within Mennonite Church USA to help involve them and show the unique qualities of Mennonite education. MEA works with Mennonite Church USA to provide leadership to church educational programs.

=== Colleges and seminaries ===
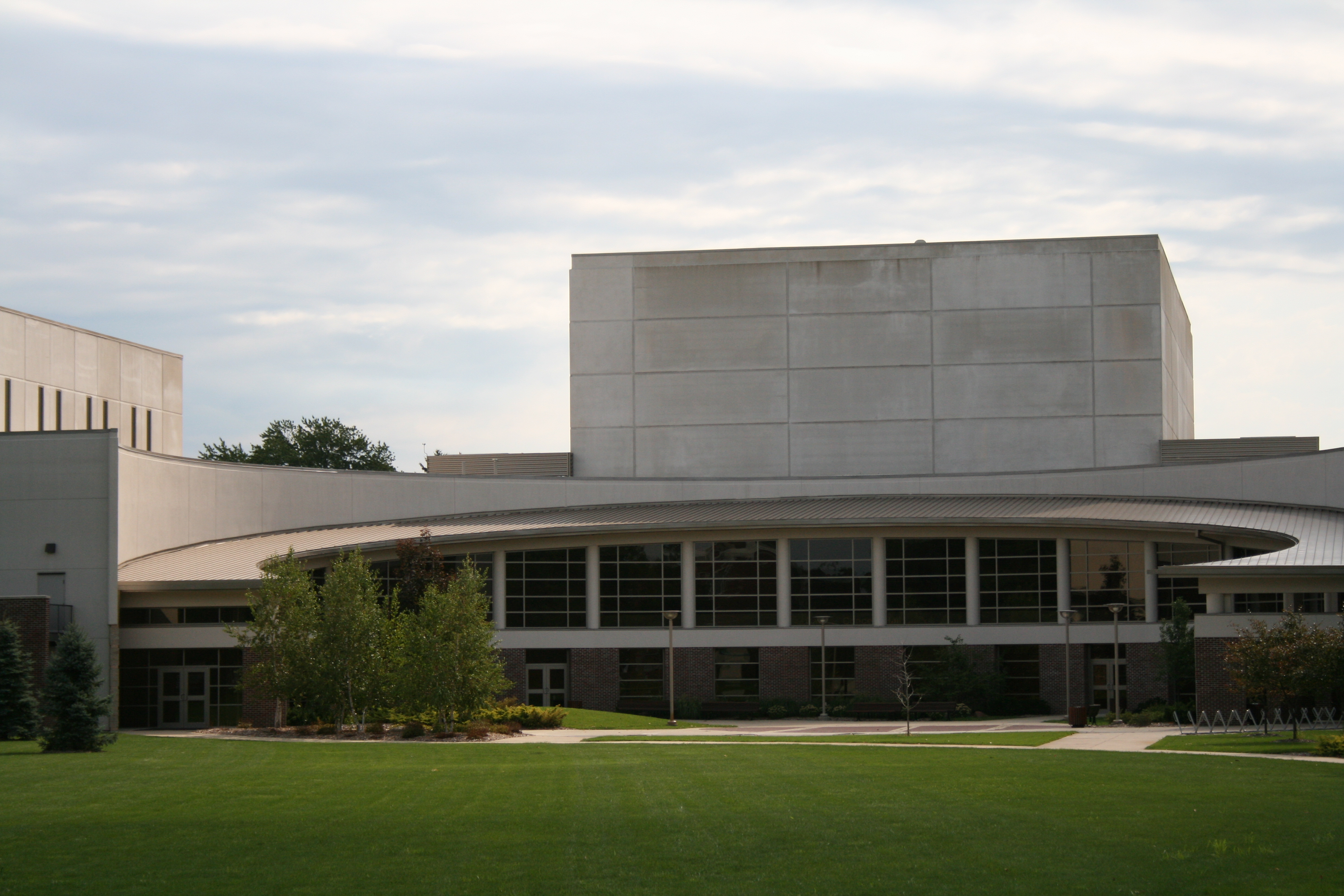
The Goshen College Music Center in Goshen, Indiana.

Mennonite Church USA provides denominational oversight through Mennonite Education Agency to five colleges and universities and two seminaries in the United States:

- Goshen College in Goshen, Indiana
- Bluffton University in Bluffton, Ohio
- Bethel College in North Newton, Kansas
- Eastern Mennonite University in Harrisonburg, Virginia
- Hesston College in Hesston, Kansas
- Anabaptist Mennonite Biblical Seminary in Elkhart, Indiana
- Eastern Mennonite Seminary on the campus of Eastern Mennonite University in Harrisonburg, Virginia

=== Secondary schools ===
- Bethany Christian Schools, Goshen, Indiana
- Central Christian School, Kidron, Ohio
- Dock Mennonite Academy, Montgomery County, Pennsylvania
- Eastern Mennonite High School, Harrisonburg, Virginia
- Freeman Academy, Freeman, South Dakota
- Lancaster Mennonite High School, Lancaster, Pennsylvania
- Philadelphia Mennonite High School, Philadelphia, Pennsylvania
- Hillcrest Academy, Kalona, Iowa (formerly Iowa Mennonite School)

== Faith and practice ==
=== Confession of Faith in a Mennonite Perspective ===
A Confession of Faith in a Mennonite Perspective provides a guide to the beliefs and practices of Mennonite Church USA. This confession was adopted in 1995 at a joint session of the Mennonite Church and General Conference Mennonite Church in Wichita, Kansas. It contains 24 articles ranging from the more general Christian theologies of God, Jesus Christ, and the Holy Spirit to the more distinct Foot Washing; Truth and the Avoidance of Oaths, Peace, Justice, and Nonresistance; and The Church's Relation to Government and Society.

=== LGBTQ inclusion ===
In 1976, progressive churches founded the Brethren Mennonite Council for LGBT Interests and Supportive Communities Network for the inclusion of LGBTQ people. In 1986 the General Conference Mennonite Church (one of the predecessors of Mennonite Church USA), meeting in Saskatoon, adopted a statement on sexuality establishing heterosexuality as the only legitimate form of sexual expression. In 1987, the Mennonite Church (another predecessor of MC USA) issued the Purdue Statement, with similar language. At the 2009 convention in Columbus, some protested for the further discussion of human sexuality.

In August 2015, the Mountain States Mennonite Conference and the Central District Conference authorized the licensing of openly LGBTQ+ pastors. In November 2015, the Western District Conference voted to allow ordained ministers to officiate at and perform blessings of same-sex marriage. Due to these positions, the Lancaster Mennonite Conference voted two weeks later to leave the Mennonite Church USA.

=== Marriage ===
On 29 May 2022 the church repealed the Membership Guidelines that forbids pastors to officiate same-sex marriages, allowing each local congregation to decide about blessings of same-sex marriage. Some area conferences already allowed pastors to solemnize same-sex marriages. The church also voted in favor of an apology to the LGBTQ community.

The Supportive Communities Network brings together affirming churches and universities.

=== Life issues ===
Mennonites have a commitment to pacifism, and members of Mennonite Church USA have a history of being conscientious objectors in wars as a way to uphold a commitment to nonviolence. They also oppose abortion and capital punishment.

MC USA has passed a resolution committing to creation care (2013) as developed by Mennonite Creation Care Network (MCCN), which in 2013 had a membership directory of 650 individuals to "advance the commitment of congregations and members in caring for creation as part of the good news of Jesus Christ" and a resolution on "Seeking Peace in Israel and Palestine" (2017).

MC USA released a "Churchwide Statement on Immigration" in 2014 that states, "We advocate for just and humane immigration policies for immigrants and refugees, and we empower congregations, area conferences and denominational staff to serve as advocates for these vulnerable groups of peoples and resolutions pertaining to immigration."

MC USA's "Churchwide Statement on Sexual Abuse" (2015) states, "We resolve to tell the truth about sexual abuse; hold abusers accountable; acknowledge the seriousness of their sin; listen with care to those who have been wounded; protect vulnerable persons from injury; work restoratively for justice; and hold out hope that wounds will be healed, forgiveness offered, and relationships established or reestablished in healthy ways."

== Political Involvement ==
For most of its history, the Mennonite Church has stayed away from political involvement. This came from a desire to separate the church from the culture of the world. In 1968 Mennonite Central Committee, the governing body for the Mennonite Church, created an advocacy office in Washington, DC. This was a drastic shift in how the church approached politics and was not appreciated by many members at the time. Since then, the church has become more politically involved as this became more normalized.

== Management of sexual violence ==
In 2015, an article in the American journal Mennonite Quarterly Review stated that the rate of sexual abuse among Mennonites was at least equal to that of the general population and criticized the churches for not responding effectively to reports of sexual abuse by leaders and for not providing sufficient support to victims. Also in 2015, Mennonite Church USA adopted and published a policy on sexual misconduct to prevent abuse.

== See also ==
- Christian Peacemaker Teams
- Mennonite Central Committee
- Mennonite Church USA Archives
- Mennonite Disaster Service
- Schowalter Foundation
