= New York Mennonite Conference =

New York Mennonite Conference is a regional conference of Mennonite Church USA comprising 14 churches Upstate New York.

Officially founded in 1973 as the NYS Mennonite Fellowship, its primary goal was to facilitate fellowship amongst congregations, while leaving most conference functions to the conferences from which members originated. By 1987, the Fellowship had taken on the functions of a conference, primarily ordination and nurture of pastoral leaders. In the early 1990s, the Fellowship took on the name, New York Mennonite Conference.

== Member congregations ==
=== Central District ===
- Rochester Mennonite Fellowship
- Sojourners Mennonite Fellowship

=== Northern District ===
- Bethel Christian Church
- First Mennonite Church of New Bremen
- Lowville Mennonite Church
- Pine Grove Mennonite Church
- Watertown Mennonite Church

=== Southern District ===
- Chenunda Creek Fellowship
- Community Mennonite Fellowship of Corning

=== Western District ===
- Buffalo Chin Emmanuel Church
- Clarence Center-Akron Mennonite Church
