= Virginia Mennonite Conference =

Body of Mennonite churches

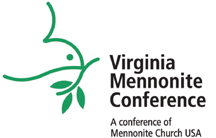
- Motto: Agent of God's Call
- Established: 1835 (first meeting)
- Affiliations: Mennonite Church USA
- Location: Harrisonburg, VA, USA
- Website: virginiaconference.org

Virginia Mennonite Conference is a body of Mennonite churches in the south-Atlantic region of the United States, consisting of Virginia, North Carolina, West Virginia, Tennessee and Kentucky and the city of Washington, D.C. There are 60 congregations in the Conference, and a number of congregations in formation without full membership status. As one of the regional Conferences of Mennonite Church USA, the congregations belong to nine Districts: Calvary, Central, Eastern (VA), Harrisonburg, Northern, Potomac, Southern, and Tennessee/Carolina/Kentucky.

== History ==
The first meeting at which minutes were taken and preserved, of what would be later be incorporated as Virginia Mennonite Conference, took place in 1835 at Weavers Mennonite Church, near Harrisonburg, Virginia. It is thought that perhaps Virginia Mennonites met in even earlier gatherings.

In 1955, Pilgrim Mennonite Church of Amelia, Virginia, withdrew from Conference and helped begin what are known as the Nationwide Fellowship Churches. Later, the Southeastern Mennonite Conference officially began their withdrawal from Virginia Mennonite Conference in June 1972.

In 2016, it suspended a pastor in one of its member churches for performing a wedding ceremony between two women. Pastor Isaac Villegas from Chapel Hill Mennonite Fellowship married the women in May 2016 with the approval of his congregation, and his ministerial license was quickly suspended by VMC with a charge of pastoral misconduct. This decision acted against a church-wide forbearance resolution passed in 2015 by Mennonite Church USA, the denominational body that oversees Virginia Mennonite Conference. It was covered in national news outlets, and numerous commentaries and editorials were published in national and Mennonite media sources.

== Organization and commissions ==
Virginia Mennonite Conference is overseen by Conference Council, an appointed group that makes larger decisions about the work of the Conference, appoints oversight leaders for the different districts and commissions, and through the Faith & Life Commission, credentials ministers. Congregations appoint delegates to represent them at two meetings a years to discern issues and vote on resolutions.

Within the Conference structure are two Commissions that work on specific foci. The Congregational Life Commission "provides vision for new expressions of Anabaptism, provides the means for congregations, conference-related programs and institutions to communicate and network their ministries, and provides educational resources for congregations to nurture the spiritual formation of their members throughout the life cycle," according to a list of Commission duties.

The Faith and Life Commission strives to "provide leadership for Conference in spiritual, doctrinal, and faith and life issues, be a forum for interchanging concerns relating to congregational life and leadership, attend to leadership needs of congregations, promote unity of faith and practice, issue ministry credentials, and provide professional development, fellowship and inspiration for pastors," according to its list of duties.

=== Conference commissions and ministries ===
- Congregational Life Commission
- Faith & Life Commission
- Historical Committee
- Virginia Mennonite Missions
- Congregational Resource Center
- Eastern Mennonite School

== Conference endorsed ministries ==
- Eastern Mennonite Seminary
- Eastern Mennonite University
- Family Life Resource Center
- Mennonite Women of Virginia
- Pleasant View, Inc.
- Virginia Mennonite Retirement Community
- Gift and Thrift, Inc.
- Highland Retreat
- Mennonite Disaster Service
- Mennowood Retirement Community
- NewBridges Immigrant Resource Center
- Roberta Webb Child Care Center
- Valley Brethren-Mennonite Heritage Center
- Virginia Mennonite Relief Sale
- Williamsburg Christian Retreat Center

== Newsletter ==
Virginia Mennonite Conference publishes a monthly newsletter Connections in conjunction with Virginia Mennonite Missions.
