= Meserete Kristos Church =

Ethiopian Anabaptist denomination

Meserete Kristos Church is a Mennonite denomination in Ethiopia and Eritrea (P'ent'ay/Evangelical). The headquarters are in Addis Ababa.

== History ==
The Church has its origins in an American mission of the Lancaster Mennonite Conference in the 1940s. The first church was founded in 1951 in Addis Ababa. Meserete Kristos Church (meaning "Christ is the foundation Church", based on I Cor. 3:11) was officially founded in 1959. According to a census published in 2022, it had 1,160 churches and 370,909 baptized members.

In 2005, Amnesty International reported the church experienced religious persecution in Eritrea, where it had been present for decades.

== Meserete Kristos College ==
The college was located in Addis Ababa until January 2007. Since its founding in 1994, the college has produced 262 graduates, and had 110 full-time and 42 part-time students enrolled in the fall of 2006. Construction of a permanent campus in Bishoftu is underway. In January 2007, all physical assets were moved to the new campus, and classes began there on February 6. The five-story education building, the first of 11 planned buildings, is half-completed, and currently houses all classrooms, academic offices, library, and language and computer labs. A men's residence was completed in 2010. Negash Kebede was installed as College President on 11 March 2007. Kiros Teka Haddis was installed as President on September 12, 2012. Fall 2014 enrollment at the college was 214 students (183 male, 31 female). Currently the President of Meserete Kiristos church is Pastor Desalegn Abebe.

== See also ==
- Christianity in Ethiopia

== Literature ==
- Mashas, Andrew. 2017. Buried we will grow. Anabaptist Witness. Article about MKC for American audience
- Hege, Nathan B. 1998. Beyond Our Prayers: Anabaptist Church Growth in Ethiopia, 1948–1998. (Scottdale, PA: Herald).
