= Eastern Mennonite Missions =

Eastern Mennonite Missions (EMM) is a mission agency based in Lancaster, Pennsylvania. EMM equips, sends, and supports mission workers in more than 30 countries.

EMM's mission statement: Christ's transforming love compels us to cross cultures, engage the world, and make disciples of Jesus.

== History ==
In 1894, a group of 12 Lancaster County Mennonites formed a group called Home Mission Advocates for the purpose of aiding in local mission work. Their original outreach took the form of local Sunday school classes and community service projects, but the group also carried a strong global vision. In 1914, the group founded Eastern Mennonite Board of Missions and Charities (EMBMC), with the aim of someday sending mission workers to various international locations.

The early days of EMM ministry established work in the Philadelphia area, the Welsh Mountains of Pennsylvania, Lancaster City, and many rural areas. In 1934, global mission work began when EMM's first international missionaries settled near Shirati, Tanzania. In the 1950s, workers began serving in Latin America, Europe, and Asia. In 1988, work expanded to include the Middle East, and in recent decades EMM has continued to experience growth in missionary sending among its international partner church network.

EMM's mission vision was initially financially supported by several dozen Mennonite churches in Lancaster County and the surrounding areas. As the work grew, the support base also grew and now includes Anabaptist congregations and individuals primarily in the Eastern United States.

The popular name Eastern Mennonite Missions (EMM) was adopted in 1993.

== Global work ==
Since EMM's founding, more than 7,440 individuals have served as missionaries and volunteer workers in 21 U.S. states and in over 109 countries.

EMM's core work has always been to multiply disciples across cultures, based on the Great Commission of Matthew 28:19 in which Jesus gives his disciples the charge to “make disciples of all nations.”

EMM personnel work in a variety of ministry areas, including business for transformation, children at risk, discipleship training, education, health and community development, hospitality, leadership training, Muslim ministry, and pioneer witness.

== Global churches ==
EMM workers have been involved in the formation of Mennonite churches around the world. Thirty-four church groups have formed or developed through the ministries of EMM, and these now comprise over 450,000 baptized members. Some of these include Kenya Mennonite Church, Tanzania Mennonite Church, the Honduran Mennonite Church, Amor Vivente (Honduras), the Vietnam Mennonite Church, Garifuna Mennonite Church (Belize and the U.S.), the K’ekchi’ Mennonite Church (Guatemala), the Peruvian Mennonite Church, Life Enrichment Church (Thailand) and numerous other church plants globally and in the U.S.

== Christian-Muslim relations ==
EMM's Christian/Muslim Relations Team was founded in 2013 by missionary, author, and professor David W. Shenk. Shenk is a Muslim studies expert and a global consultant for EMM, having authored or co-authored multiple books about Christian-Muslim relations and global missions. These include Surprises of the Christian Way, Journeys of the Muslim Nation and the Christian Church, Anabaptists Meeting Muslims, Creating Communities of the Kingdom, Global Gods, God’s Call to Mission, Teatime in Mogadishu, A Christian and a Muslim in Dialogue, and Christian. Muslim. Friend. Shenk's approach to Christian-Muslim relations is founded on the Anabaptist commitment to pacifism and Christian witness.

Initially a three-member team, the Christian/Muslim Relations Team grew to six members as of 2021. Members act as global missionaries with EMM, traveling together and separately to multiple countries each year. Although the stated mission of the team is to “equip Christians around the world for life-giving relationships with Muslims,” the team also regularly engages with Muslims.

== Presidents ==
Past EMM presidents include John H. Mellinger (1914–1934), Henry Garber (1934–1956), H. Raymond Charles (1956–1980), Paul G. Landis (1980–1993), Norman G. Shenk (acting president, 1993–1994), Richard Showalter (1994–2011), Nelson Okanya (2011-2018), Gerry Keener (2019–2021), and Marvin Lorenzana (2021–present).
