= Mennonite Disaster Service =

Network for disaster relief in North America

- Formation: 1950
- Founded: 1950
- Purpose: Disaster Relief
- Location: Lititz, Pennsylvania, USA
- Region served: United States, Canada^{[3]}
- Key people: Kevin King, Executive Director
- Revenue: $2,870,251 ^{[1]}
- Employees: 11 ^{[1]}
- Volunteers: 3,000+
- Website: https://mds.org

The Mennonite Disaster Service (MDS) is a volunteer network through which various groups within the Anabaptist tradition assist people affected by disasters in North America. The organization was founded in 1950 and was incorporated as a 501(c)(3) non-profit organization in 1993.

The MDS currently involves more than 3,000 members of the Mennonite, Amish and Brethren in Christ churches (BIC). The primary focus of the service is cleanup, repair, and the rebuilding of homes. The work of the group supplements the disaster relief provided by the Red Cross. The Mennonite Disaster Service also works closely with Mennonite Central Committee.^{[4]}

A quarterly newsletter called Behind the Hammer is published.

The volunteer amateur radio group Mennonet provides communication services for MDS. Radio equipment was first deployed by MDS in 1960.^{[4]}
