= Lancaster Mennonite School =

Location
- 2176 Lincoln Hwy E Lancaster, Pennsylvania; United States; 40°01′39″N 76°13′23″W

Information
- Funding type: Private school
- Religious affiliation: Mennonite
- Established: 1942
- Principal: Kirk Benner
- Principal: Seth Buckwalter
- Principal: Lindsay Carson
- Superintendent: Dr. Michael Badriaki
- Faculty: Approximately 50 faculty members
- Grades: PreK-12th
- Enrollment: Approximately 500 students
- Average class size: 25
- Student to teacher ratio: 13:1
- Campus: Lancaster Campus
- Campus size: 95 acres
- Colors: Black and gold
- Athletics: 16 interscholastic sports
- Athletics conference: Lancaster-Lebanon League
- Mascot: Blazers
- Annual tuition: $7,473-$12,700/yr
- Website: https://www.lancastermennonite.org/

Lancaster Mennonite School is a private Christian school located in Lancaster County, Pennsylvania, United States. The Lancaster Campus, east of the city of Lancaster, Pennsylvania, serves students from Pre-K through twelve. The high school on the Lancaster Campus is known as Lancaster Mennonite High School. In 2021, the former New Danville and Locust Grove campuses closed, and merged with the Lancaster Campus.

== History ==
Lancaster Mennonite School is now one campus, but was previously composed of multiple campuses, founded as separate schools.

Locust Grove Mennonite School was founded in 1939, and New Danville Mennonite School in 1940, to offer grades one through eight. The Lancaster Conference of the Mennonite Church began the development of a Christian high school, Lancaster Mennonite School, on the site of the former Yeates School in 1942. To better serve families in northwest Lancaster County, Lancaster Mennonite School then helped to start Kraybill Mennonite School in 1949, which originally provided first through tenth grade.

Although each school was founded independently, the schools shared a common mission, values, and constituency, and eventually decided to work together as a comprehensive PreK-12 system under the name of Lancaster Mennonite School. New Danville merged with Lancaster in 2001, followed by Locust Grove in 2003 and Kraybill in 2006. Hershey Christian School was acquired in February 2015. In February 2021, Lancaster Mennonite announced it would be merging all campuses into one unified campus at the 2176 Lincoln Highway location.

=== Key dates ===
1939
Locust Grove Mennonite School (now Locust Grove Campus) was founded.
1940
New Danville Mennonite School (now New Danville Campus) was founded.
1942
Lancaster Mennonite School was founded.
1949
Kraybill Mennonite School was founded in the Kraybill Meetinghouse with grades 1–10 in cooperation with Lancaster Mennonite School.
1965
LMS built a junior high building on the Kraybill Campus.
1970
Lancaster Mennonite School was renamed Lancaster Mennonite High School to emphasize that it offered grades 9-12.
2000-01
Middle school (grades 6–8) started on the Lancaster Campus.
2001-02
New Danville Mennonite School merged to form Lancaster Mennonite School, one K-12 school with two campuses.
2003-04
Locust Grove Mennonite School (PreK-8) merged with Lancaster Mennonite School and became the Locust Grove Campus.
2006-07
Kraybill Mennonite School (K-8) merged with Lancaster Mennonite School and became the Kraybill Campus (PreK-8).
2014-15
Hershey Christian School (K-12) was acquired.
2018-19
The Hershey Campus adds prekindergarten to become a PreK-12 campus.
2019
The Hershey Campus was sold to St. Joan of Arc School and is no longer a branch of Lancaster Mennonite School.

2021

Lancaster Mennonite announces they will be selling the Locust Grove and New Danville and merging all the PreK-12th grades at the main campus on Lincoln Highway East.

== Facilities ==
The Lancaster Campus has two residence halls for boarding students that together house about 60 out-of-state and international students attending Lancaster Mennonite High School. Millstream Hall, completed in February, 2015, holds the majority of students, with some choosing the older Graybill Hall.

The G. Parke Book Building, renovated in 2004, is home to specialized agriculture and technology classrooms.

The Calvin and Janet High Fine Arts Center contains an 1,168-seat auditorium, music rooms and art rooms.

A two-story building provides classroom space for the middle school on the lower level and the high school on the upper level, along with the Alumni Dining Hall and library.

In 2008, the Rutt Academic Center was added, including classrooms for mathematics, business classes, sciences, and family and consumer sciences. The building also houses a welcome center and administrative offices for the school. In 2021, the Rutt Academic Center was converted into an elementary building, with one Spanish-Immersion track and one English track.

The Lancaster Campus has two gymnasiums, an artificial-turf soccer and field hockey stadium, a lighted baseball stadium, softball diamonds, and tennis courts. The school completed a new eight-lane track and field facility in the fall of 2009.

== Athletics ==
The Lancaster Mennonite High School sports program competes in the Lancaster-Lebanon League (local public school league) and the Pennsylvania Interscholastic Athletic Association.

The following high school sports are offered by Lancaster Mennonite High School:

Fall
boys' and girls' cross country, girls' field hockey, golf, boys' and girls' soccer, girls' volleyball, girls' tennis

Winter
girls' basketball, boys' basketball, chess team, quiz bowl

Spring
baseball, softball, boys' tennis, boys' volleyball, track & field

Lancaster Mennonite's most successful athletic program is the boys' soccer team. Since 1986, they have won eight PIAA District 3 titles and eight Lancaster-Lebanon League titles. They won the PIAA State Championship in 2011 and 2024. In 2012, 2014 and 2017 the Blazers returned to the PIAA state title game but came up short on all three occasions. Boys basketball has also been a state-level contender: in 2016–17, the LMH boys' basketball team placed second in District III and advanced to the state quarterfinals; in 2017-18 they were fourth in the district and advanced to the PIAA semifinals.

At the elementary level, Lancaster Mennonite School formed Lancaster Mennonite Youth Athletics (LMYA) as an alternative to community leagues for basketball, soccer and field hockey, softball and basketball.

== Music ==
Lancaster Mennonite High School offers concert band, jazz band, orchestra and various choral groups. Campus Chorale performs concerts at the school and in local congregations. Through another partnership program, students who desire a special music focus can take classes in Millersville University's Advanced Music Program, where they take some courses with Millersville University professors. Lancaster Mennonite School provides the residential program and general education courses for students from all over the world who wish to study music at the university. Successfully completed courses are added to the students' high school transcripts.

Chapel services provide another opportunity for students to share musical abilities as they assist in worship. The elementary and middle school music programs also provide many opportunities for vocal and instrumental instruction and performance.

== Spiritual life ==
School literature maintains that spiritual life involves every activity of the school, including student and teacher behavior in and out of the classroom. The school offers many specific and intentional activities to highlight the spiritual dimension of life. Elementary students receive daily Bible instruction and attend a weekly chapel service at their level of understanding. Middle school students have Bible class, a weekly chapel service, and have extended times for focusing on their relationship with God. All high school students attend chapel services three times a week, and take a theology or Bible class each year. The school expects all teachers to integrate a Christian perspective into all subject areas.

According to the school's admissions office, students need not subscribe to a particular creed or doctrinal statement. The school's official hiring policies do not require faculty to attend a Mennonite congregation, but they must agree with the Shared Convictions of Global Anabaptists and the school's mission statement and philosophy of education. This document emphasizes a personal relationship with God through Christ, salvation through faith, and a commitment to following Christ's example and teachings. School promotional literature states that following Christ involves having his global perspective and commitment to justice for all people in addition to personal morality.

== Academics ==
Originally, the promotional literature of the schools that today form Lancaster Mennonite School indicated an objective of academic parity with the best local public schools, but with a spiritual dimension. More recently, promotional literature has stressed "educational excellence." Lancaster Mennonite's curriculum focuses on: faith formation, fine arts, STEAM (science, technology, engineering, art and math), world languages, and outdoor education.

The school's Guidance Office prepares an annual Academic Profile document that accompanies transcripts sent to colleges. According to this document, the average standardized test scores of Lancaster Mennonite School students are consistently superior to local and state averages for public and church-related schools. The reported SAT scores of Lancaster Mennonite High School students are consistently on a par with the best public schools in Lancaster County.

Annually, the school publishes an extensive Curriculum Guide for current and prospective students. According to the 2021-22 guide, numerous courses are offered in many academic disciplines, including 15 Advanced Placement courses and 3 of those courses offered through dual enrollment with HACC. The high school has an agriculture program with an FFA (formerly Future Farmers of America) chapter and a number of technology classes such as welding and small engine repair. In addition to formal classes, the Curriculum Guide indicates that high school students can develop advanced practical skills through the website team, the stage crew, yearbook staff and other opportunities.

The school does not have a selective admissions policy, but accepts students with a wide cross-section of abilities. The school offers many courses that are vocationally-oriented in business, agriculture, family and consumer science, etc., and provides for students who need learning support.

== Controversy ==
In 2010, assistant principal Steven J. Geyer was charged with eleven counts of sexual offense including five counts of felony and misdemeanor assault, three counts of felony unlawful contact with a minor and three counts of felony corruption of minors at the Locust Grove Campus. Geyer sexually assaulted three South Korean exchange students ages 12 to 16 from 2009 to 2011 in a camper in his East Lancaster home. At his sentencing a prosecutor likened him to a "sex trafficker" and assistant DA Karen Mansfield stated "He specifically brought these boys to his home for sexual abuse and torture.". Mansfield explained that he chose the South Korean international students because he knew that it would be shameful for them to come forward with the abuse and he targeted them because he knew their culture.

== Publications ==
Silhouette is a student literary magazine that publishes the creative work of students. Laurel Wreath is the yearbook for Lancaster Mennonite High School. The school also publishes Bridges magazine for alumni, school families and others interested in the school.

== Notable alumni ==
- Taylor Kinney, star of Chicago Fire (2000)
- Donald Kraybill, researcher and author on Anabaptist groups
- Keegan Rosenberry, professional soccer player for the Philadelphia Union, class of 2012
- Lloyd Smucker, Pennsylvania State Representative (1981)
- J. Lowell Stoltzfus, Maryland state senator (1967)
- Denison Witmer, singer
