= Thomas Arthur Nelson =

Scottish publisher & Scotland international rugby union player

Thomas Nelson
- Born: Thomas Arthur Nelson; 22 September 1876 Edinburgh, Midlothian, Scotland
- Died: 9 April 1917 (aged 40) Arras, France

Rugby union career
- Position: Centre
Amateur team(s)
Years	Team	Apps	(Points)
1896-1900	Oxford University		
International career
Years	Team	Apps	(Points)
1898	Scotland	1	(0)

Captain Thomas Arthur Nelson, JP (22 September 1876 – 9 April 1917) was a Scottish international rugby union player, soldier and publisher in his family's firm of Thomas Nelson and Sons. He was killed in the First World War.

== Background ==
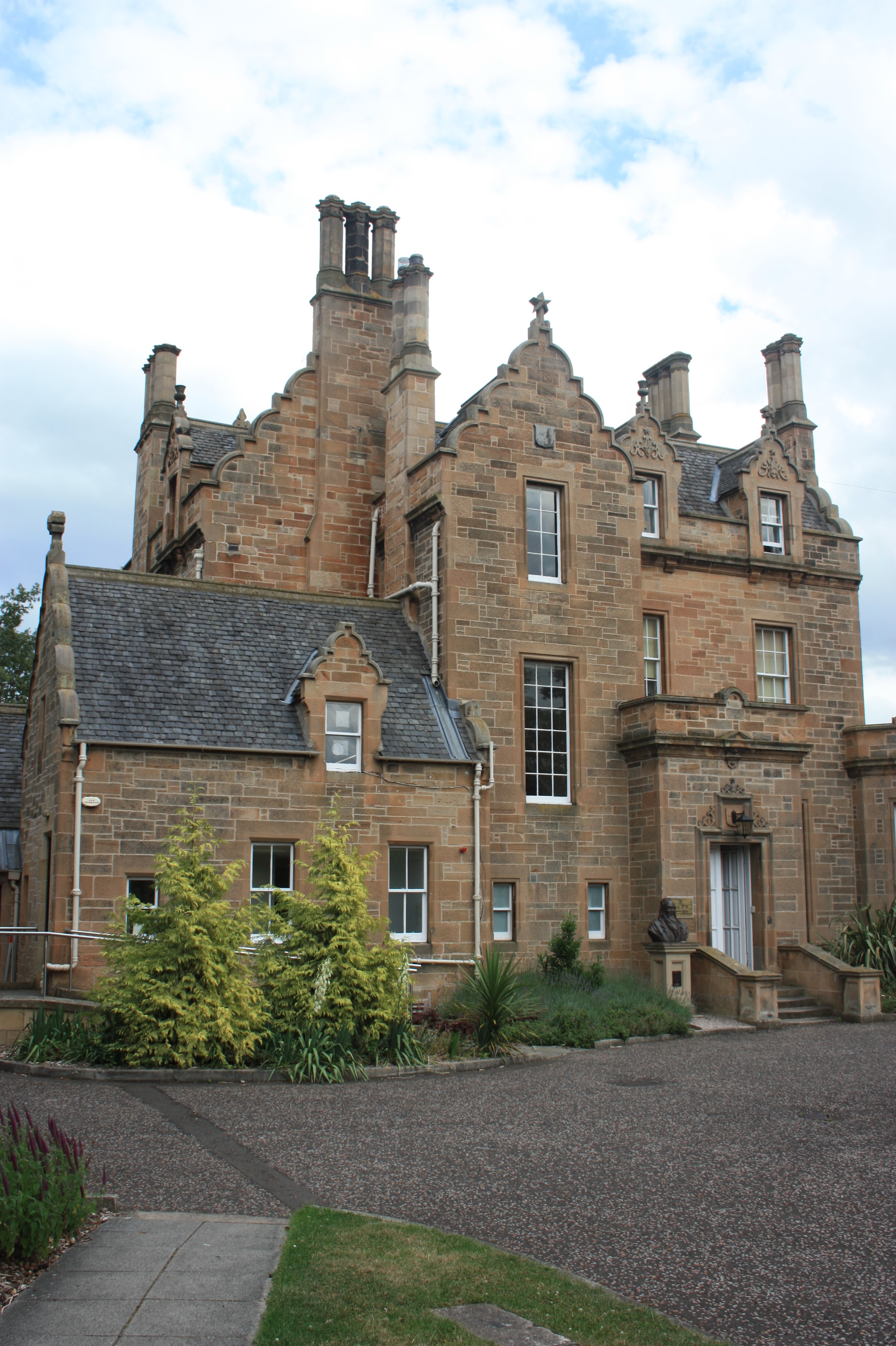
Abden House, Edinburgh

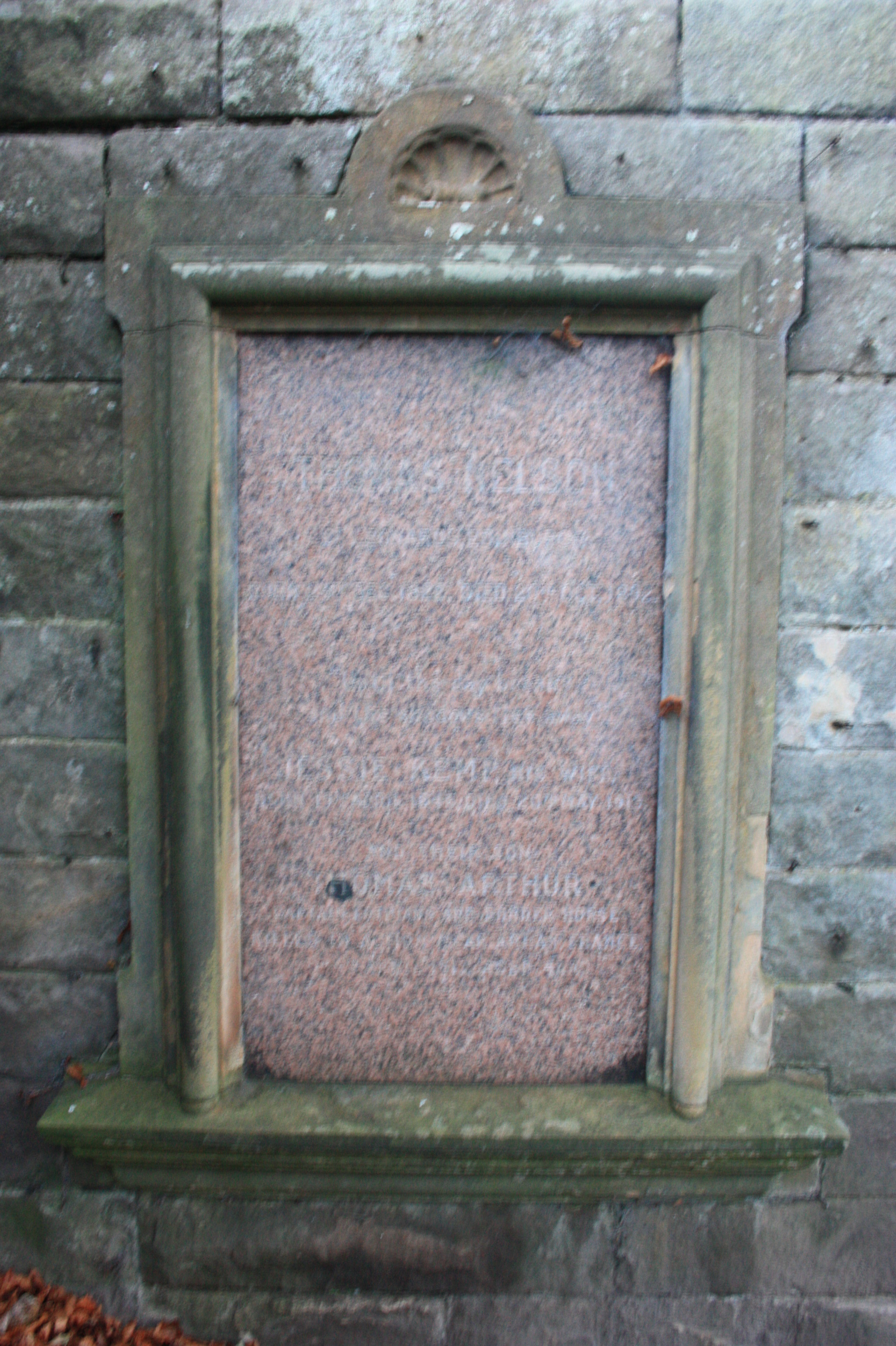
The gravestone of Thomas Nelson, Grange Cemetery, Edinburgh; Thomas Arthur appears named at the bottom.

He was born on 22 September 1876, the son of the publisher Thomas Nelson and his wife Jessie Kemp. The family lived in the house of their grandfather Thomas Nelson: Abden House on the south of Edinburgh. His grandfather died in 1861, leaving a considerable fortune. His father built a new house, St Leonards, in the grounds of Abden House and the family moved there on its completion in 1890.

In 1892 Nelson obtained an estate at Achnacloich, on the shore of Loch Etive near Oban, Argyll. He spent a considerable part of each year there. He was a Justice of the peace for Argyllshire.

== Rugby Union career ==
=== Amateur career ===
He was educated at Edinburgh Academy, where he became a rugby union player. He played for a combined Edinburgh Academy - Watsons College schoolboy side in January 1895.

He then went to study Classics at Oxford University, where he befriended John Buchan. Nelson played rugby union for Oxford University, playing for them from 1896. He captained the side in 1900.

=== Provincial career ===
Nelson was named in the Anglo-Scots side to face South of Scotland District on 25 December 1897. The match was called off.

He was originally named in the Provinces District side in December 1898, but his selection fell through. It was remarked that Nelson was not expected to turn out for the Provinces District in their match against Cities District on 14 January 1899.

=== International career ===
Nelson was capped for Scotland in 1898. He rivalled Allan Smith for a place in the international side. It was thought that Nelson would get a place at Centre in front of the Smith for the Ireland match as Smith was struggling for fitness. Smith started that match, but Nelson played alongside Smith at Centre for the match against England.

== Publishing career ==
The John Buchan novel The Thirty-Nine Steps (1915) is dedicated to him. Nelson and Buchan had been friends since Nelson was an undergraduate at University College, Oxford. He became head of the family publishing firm of Thomas Nelson and Sons, which employed Buchan as literary advisor and was one of the writer's publishers.

He was noted as a benevolent owner of the company. The publishing house had an athletics club and Nelson gave over a portion of his family estate so that the club could use it. The company was noted as a pioneer in looking after the health of its employees at the time; by employing an official to look after their health.

== Military career ==
At the First World War, Nelson became a Captain with the Lothians and Border Horse attached to the Machine Gun Corps. He then moved to special service. He joined the Tank service in early 1917. He was mentioned in dispatches (MiD) during the war.

== Death ==
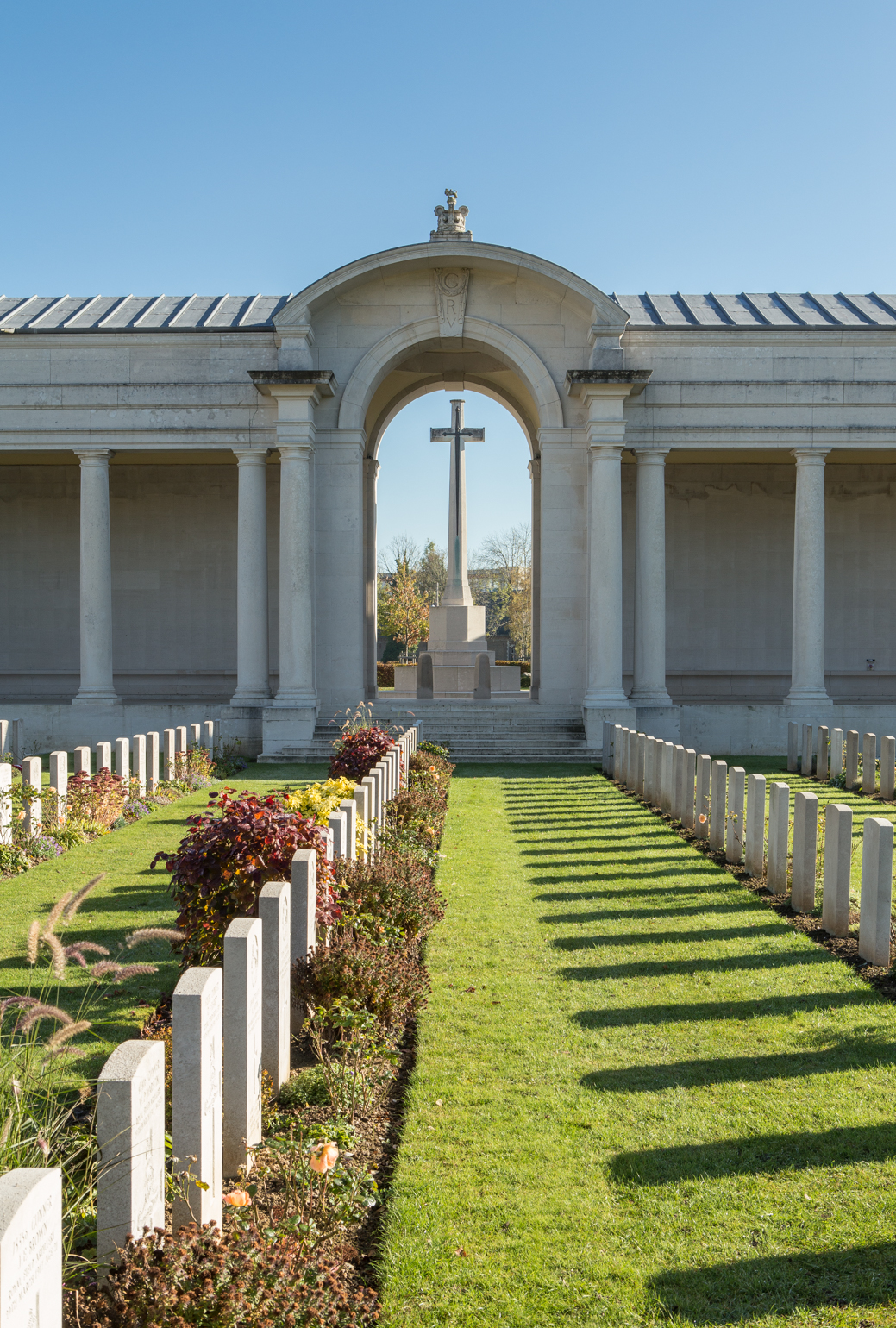
Faubourg d'Amiens Cemetery

Nelson was killed on 9 April 1917 on the first day of the Battle of Arras in World War I He was killed by a stray shell. He had been on the front for 18 months.

He is buried in Faubourg D'Amiens Cemetery, near Arras (grave reference VII.G.26). He is also memorialised on his parents grave in Grange Cemetery in south Edinburgh and on the Scottish Rugby Union War Memorial at Murrayfield Stadium. The Hull Daily Mail headlined A Publishers Fortune detailing that Nelson of Achnacloich in Argyll left an estate of £470,782. £219,300 of that estate represented his holding in the publishing firm.

== Family ==
In 1903 he was married to Margaret Balfour, daughter of the Liverpool merchant, Alexander Balfour. They had six children, including Alexander Ronan Nelson (1906–1997) and Elisabeth Nelson (1912–1999), who married The Hon. Bryan Walter Guinness (later 2nd Baron Moyne), then becoming Elisabeth Guinness, Lady Moyne.

Following his death Margaret married Paul Lucien Maze (1887–1979), a Frenchman, and became known as Margaret Maze.
