= Michael S. Hyatt =

American author, podcaster, blogger and speaker

- Education: Baylor University, philosophy, B.S.
- Occupations: Blogger; podcaster; speaker
- Employer(s): Thomas Nelson (1998–2012) Michael Hyatt & Company (2012–present)
- Spouse: Gail Hyatt
- Children: 5
- Website: michaelhyatt.com

Michael Scott Hyatt is an American author, podcaster, blogger, speaker, and the CEO and founder of Full Focus (formerly Michael Hyatt & Co). He has written several books about leadership, productivity, and goal setting.

== Career ==
Hyatt's publishing career began at Word Publishing while a student at Baylor University where he graduated with a degree in philosophy. He started his own publishing company, Wolgemuth & Hyatt, with Robert Wolgemuth in 1986. In 1992, Word Publishing acquired Wolgemuth & Hyatt.

He was a literary agent from 1992 until 1998, after which he joined Thomas Nelson. During this period, he wrote several books about the Year 2000 problem, including the fictional Y2K: The Day the World Shut Down as well as non-fiction books The Millennium Bug: How to Survive the Coming Chaos and The Y2K Personal Survival Guide. Hyatt was promoted to president and COO of Thomas Nelson in February 2004 and was made CEO in August 2005. He began blogging in 2004.

By 2006, Hyatt was serving as chairman and chief executive of the Nashville, Tennessee-based Christian books publisher as it became a private company. His tenure as CEO ended in April 2011 but he continued to serve as chairman of the company. The same year, Thomas Nelson was acquired by HarperCollins. Hyatt then began hosting the weekly podcast This is Your Life dedicated to intentional leadership.

Hyatt also wrote several more books including Platform: Get Noticed in a Noisy World, a New York Times Best Seller, and four Wall Street Journal Best Sellers: Living Forward, Your Best Year Ever, Free to Focus, and The Vision Driven Leader.

In 2012, Hyatt founded the organization that would later become Michael Hyatt & Company (and then Full Focus). Under his leadership, Michael Hyatt & Company has been featured in the Inc. 5000 list of the fastest-growing companies in America for three years in a row. The company was also listed in Inc's 2020 list of "Best Places to Work". Hyatt announced in 2021 that he would step down as the company's CEO and his daughter, Megan Hyatt Miller, would take the helm.

In 2017, Hyatt created the Full Focus Planner The Full Focus Planner is a physical planner designed to help people plan their year, design their days, and achieve their goals. It claims to be built from a proven goal-achievement and productivity framework, it'll help you end chaotic days and establish peace, confidence, and success.

== Personal life ==
He and his wife Gail live in Nashville, Tennessee. They have five daughters. He is an ordained deacon in the Antiochian Orthodox Christian Archdiocese of North America (Eastern Orthodox Church), he serves in St Ignatius Antiochian Orthodox Church in Franklin, TN.

== Bibliography ==
- Hyatt, Michael S.; Grant, George (1998). Y2K: The Day the World Shut Down. Word Pub. ISBN 978-0-8499-1387-7.
- Hyatt, Michael S. (March 1, 1999). The Y2K Personal Survival Guide: Everything You Need to Know to Get from This Side of the Crisis to the Other. Regnery Publishing. ISBN 978-0-89526-301-8.
- Hyatt, Michael S. (1999). The Millennium Bug: How to Survive the Coming Chaos. Broadway Books. ISBN 978-0-7679-0374-5.
- Hyatt, Michael S. (2012). Platform: Get Noticed in a Noisy World. Thomas Nelson. ISBN 978-1-59555-503-8.
- Hyatt, Michael (2013). The Virtual Assistant Solution : Come up for Air, Offload the Work You Hate, and Focus on What You Do Best. Los Gatos. ISBN 978-0-9910244-0-7.
- Hyatt, Michael; Harkavy, Daniel (March 1, 2016). Living Forward: A Proven Plan to Stop Drifting and Get the Life You Want. Baker Books. ISBN 978-1-4934-0325-7.
- Hyatt, Michael (January 2, 2018). Your Best Year Ever: A 5-Step Plan for Achieving Your Most Important Goals. Baker Publishing Group. ISBN 978-0-8010-7525-4.
- Hyatt, Michael (2019). Free to Focus: A Total Productivity System to Achieve More by Doing Less. Baker Publishing Group. ISBN 978-0801075261.
- Hyatt, Michael (2020). The Vision Driven Leader: 10 Questions to Focus Your Efforts, Energize Your Team, and Scale Your Business. ISBN 978-0801075278.
