= Kids Who Kill =

1998 non-fiction book by Mike Huckabee and George Grant

Kids Who Kill: Confronting Our Culture of Violence
- Cover of the first edition
- Authors: Mike Huckabee; George Grant
- Language: English
- Subject: Juvenile delinquency
- Published: 1998
- Publication place: United States
- Media type: Print
- ISBN: 978-0805417944

Kids Who Kill: Confronting Our Culture of Violence is a 1998 non-fiction book by former Arkansas Governor Mike Huckabee and Evangelical Christian author and pastor George Grant.

The book is a response to the school shootings carried out by teenagers, arguing that these tragedies are the result of a society in decline, and that abortion, pornography, media violence, premarital sex, divorce, drug abuse and homosexuality were among the causes of the decline.

== Contents ==
Huckabee and Grant argue that the breakdown of the family structure leads to childhood crime, as well as to a high level of other immoral acts. They detail these themes in his outline of the book (pp. 4–5) as follows:

- "We'll explore the notion that at the heart of [juvenile criminal violence] are the questions of character, virtue, and cultural cohesion.
- "The various contributing factors of America's cultural demoralization are examined [including] a disregard for the value of life.
- "We'll develop the notion that the key to our recovery is the vitality of America's basic values: faith, family, work, and community."

The book caused some controversy when, in December 2007, several news sources, including Mother Jones, reported that the book equates environmentalism with pornography, homosexuality with necrophilia, and nonbelievers with "evildoers". During the 1998 Arkansas gubernatorial race, Democratic nominee Bill Bristow criticized Huckabee for making money off of the Jonesboro massacre.
