= George Grant (author) =

American evangelical writer and pastor

George E. Grant (born 1954 in Houston, Texas) is an American evangelical writer, and a pastor in the Presbyterian Church in America (PCA).

He was a church planter and pastor in Texas for ten years. He then served as an assistant to D. James Kennedy at the Coral Ridge Presbyterian Church and taught at Knox Theological Seminary. Following his move to Tennessee in 1991, Grant founded the King's Meadow Study Center and Franklin Classical School in Franklin. In 2006, he helped found New College Franklin, a Christian liberal arts college. Grant has also founded several Christian schools in northern Iraq. He is "a prolific author of Christian books." He is currently involved in church planting in Middle Tennessee and serves as the pastor of Parish Presbyterian Church in Franklin, Tennessee.

Grant is a historian, and an anti-abortion advocate, who has authored a book: Killer Angel: A biography on Planned Parenthood's Margret Sanger.

Grant is a prominent figure in the Christian reconstructionist movement in the United States, and has been noted for his conservative views, particularly on the topic of homosexuality.

== Education ==
Grant has degrees in political science from the University of Houston (B.A.), Philosophy from Whitefield Theological Seminary (M.A., D.Litt., PhD.), Humanities from Belhaven College (D. Hum.), and Theology from Knox Theological Seminary (D. Min. Cand.).

== Career ==
Grant is a former vice president of Coral Ridge Presbyterian Church, a Florida megachurch, and has been a lecturer at Knox Theological Seminary. Grant became executive director of the Coral Ridge ministry on February 1, 1990; the ministry had a $17 million annual budget in 1990.

Grant planted Parish Presbyterian Church in Franklin, Tennessee in 2006. He continues to be Pastor. Grant is the founder of Franklin Classical School, a K - 12, college preparatory, classical school in Franklin, Tennessee.

== Political activity ==
In 1991 Grant was one of the founders of the U.S. Taxpayers' Party, which sought to outlaw abortion, end government funding for the Department of Education and the National Endowment for the Arts, and replace government funded welfare benefits with private charity.

== Beliefs ==
Grant is a notable Christian reconstructionist; Reason magazine in 1998 quoted him as saying "World conquest. It is dominion we are after...." Grant appeared in the 2017 creationist documentary film Is Genesis History?, in which he advocates young Earth creationism.

In his 1993 book Legislating Immorality: the Homosexual Movement Comes out of the Closet, Grant wrote positively about past executions of gay people. He criticized the abandoning of the death penalty for homosexuality, writing that "[s]adly, the 20th century saw this remarkable 2,000-year-old commitment suddenly dissipate."

In 2016, Grant was a plaintiff in a lawsuit against a Tennessee county clerk and the state attorney general arguing that legalization of same-sex marriage infringed on their rights as voters. The suit was dismissed by the county and again by the appellate court, who found the plaintiffs suffered no harm and lacked legal standing.

In his 1987 book The Changing of the Guard: Biblical Principles for Political Action, Grant wrote "Christians have an obligation, a mandate, a holy responsibility to reclaim the land for Jesus Christ, to have dominion in civil structures just as in every other aspect of life and godliness. But it is dominion we are after, not just a voice. It is dominion we are after, not just influence. It is dominion we are after, not just equal time. It is dominion we are after. World conquest, that's what Christ has commissioned us to accomplish. We must win the world with the power of the Gospel, and we must never settle for anything less. Thus Christian politics has as its primary intent the conquest of the land, of men, families, institutions, bureaucracies, courts, and governments for the kingdom of Christ."

== Published books ==
=== Author or co-Author ===
- The American Vision, 1984
- Bringing in the Sheaves: Replacing Government Welfare with Biblical Charity, 1985, '89, '95
- In the Shadow of Plenty: Biblical Principles for Welfare, 1986, '98, 2009
- The Dispossessed: Homelessness in America, 1986
- To the Work: A Handbook for Church Diaconal Ministry, 1986
- The Changing of the Guard: The Vital Role Christians Play in America’s Unfolding Cultural Drama, 1987, '95
- The Catechism of the New Age: A Response to Dungeons and Dragons, with Peter Leithart, 1987
- Rebuilding the Walls: A Biblical Strategy for Restoring America's Greatness, with Peter Waldron, 1987
- Grand Illusions: The Legacy of Planned Parenthood, 1988, 1993, 1998, 2000
- Trial and Error: The American Civil Liberties Union and Its Impact on Your Family, 1989, '93
- The Legacy of Planned Parenthood, 1989
- Third Time Around: The History of the Pro-Life Movement from the First Century to the Present, 1990, 2010
- Clean Air: A Citizen's Handbook for Media Accountability, with Peter Leithart, 1990
- In Defense of Greatness: How Biblical Character Shapes A Nation's Destiny, with Peter Leithart, 1990
- The Walls Came Tumbling Down: The Fall of Communism in Our Time, with Peter Leithart, 1990
- The Blood of the Moon: Understanding the Conflict between Islam and Western Civilization, 1991, 2001
- The Quick and the Dead: RU-486 and the New Chemical Warfare Against Your Family, 1991
- Homelessness In America: Its Causes and Its Cures, 1991
- Unnatural Affections: The Impuritan Ethic of the Modern Church, 1991
- The Last Crusader: The Untold Story of Christopher Columbus, 1992
- Hillarious: The Wacky Wit, Wisdom, and Wonderment of Hillary Rodham-Clinton, 1992
- Perot: The Populist Appeal of Strong-Man Politics, 1992
- The 57% Solution: A Conservative Strategy for the Next Four Years, 1993
- Where Do We Go From Here: An Agenda for Conservatives During Cultural Captivity, 1993
- Legislating Immorality: The Homosexual Movement Comes Out of the Closet, with Mark Horne, 1993
- The Family Under Siege: What the New Social Engineers Have in Mind for Your Children, 1994
- The Micah Mandate: Balancing the Christian Life, 1995, '99, 2010
- Killer Angel: A Biography of Margaret Sanger, 1995, 2000, 2010, 2014
- The Dittohead’s Little Instruction Book, 1996
- You Might Be a Liberal If, 1996
- Our Character, Our Future: Reclaiming America’s Moral Destiny, with Alan Keyes, 1996
- Immaculate Deception: The Shifting Agenda of Planned Parenthood, 1996
- Buchanan: Caught in the Crossfire, 1996
- Moral Earthquakes, with O.S. Hawkins, 1996
- Bless This Food, with Karen Grant and Julia Pitkin, 1996
- The Patriot’s Handbook: A Citizenship Primer, 1996, 2001
- Carry a Big Stick: The Uncommon Heroism of Theodore Roosevelt, 1996
- Faithful Volunteers: The History of Religion in Tennessee, with Stephen Mansfield, 1997
- Letters Home: Counsel from the Sages of the Past to their Loved Ones, with Karen Grant, 1997
- Logomorphs: A Politically Incorrect Dictionary, 1997
- The Reader’s Journal: The Stirling Bridge Classics Program, 1997
- Best Friends: Lessons from Extraordinary Relationships through the Ages, with Karen Grant, 1998
- Kids Who Kill: Confronting Our Culture of Violence, with Governor Mike Huckabee, 1998
- Y2K: A Novel, with Michael Hyatt, 1998
- Just Visiting: How Travel Has Enlightened Lives Throughout History, with Karen Grant, 1999
- Lost Causes: The Romantic Attraction of Defeated Men and Movements, with Karen Grant, 1999
- Shelf Life: How Books Have Changed the Destinies of Men and Nations, with Karen Grant, 1999
- Going Somewhere: A Dan and Bea Adventure, 1999
- Christmas Spirit: The Celebrations of the Season, with Gregory Wilbur, 1999
- The Pocket Patriot: Citizenship Basics for the New Millennium, 2000
- The Christian Almanac: Each Day in History, with Gregory Wilbur, 2000, '02
- Garden Graces: How the Tasks of Gardening Have Shaped Art, Music, and History, with Karen Grant, 2001
- The Absolutes: The Indisputable Principles of Civilized Society, with James Robison, 2002
- Center of the Storm: Practicing Principled Leadership in Times of Crisis, with Katherine Harris, 2002
- An Emerging Nation: The American War of Independence, 2003
- The Importance of the Electoral College, 2004
- The Courage of Theodore Roosevelt, 2005
- On the Road to Independence, with Gary DeMar, 2006
- Cheerful Givers, 2008
- The American Patriot's Handbook: The Writings, History, and Spirit of a Free Nation, 2009, 2016

=== Editor ===
- Homosexuality, the Military, and the Future: The Moral and Strategic Crisis, editor, 1993
- Gays in the Military: A Caveat Collection, editor, 1993
- Hero Tales: How Common Lives Reveal the Uncommon Genius of America, editor, 2000
- From Bannockburn to Flodden: Tales by Sir Walter Scott, editor, 2001
- From Gileskirk to Greyfriars: Tales by Sir Walter Scott, editor, 2001
- From Glencoe to Stirling Bridge: Tales by Sir Walter Scott, editor, 2001
- From Montrose to Culloden: Tales by Sir Walter Scott, editor, 2001
- Q and I: An Arthur Quiller-Couch Anthology, editor, 2003
- Parish Life: A Thomas Chalmers Anthology, editor, 2003
- Thomas Jefferson, by John Morse, editor, 2005
- George Washington, by Henry Cabot Lodge, editor, 2005
- The Expulsive Power of a New Affection: A Sermon by Thomas Chalmers, editor, 2007, 09
- A Sabbath Psalter: Scripture Readings by Thomas Chalmers, editor, 2010

== Personal life ==
Grant lives near Franklin with his wife and co-author Karen. They have three grown children and six grandchildren.
