= Thomas Nelson (1822–1892) =

Scottish businessman (1822–1892)

Thomas Nelson FRSE (1822–1892) was a Scottish businessman who joined the family publishing firm of Thomas Nelson in 1839 at which point it was renamed Thomas Nelson & Sons. In 1850 he invented an improved rotary printing press.

== Life ==
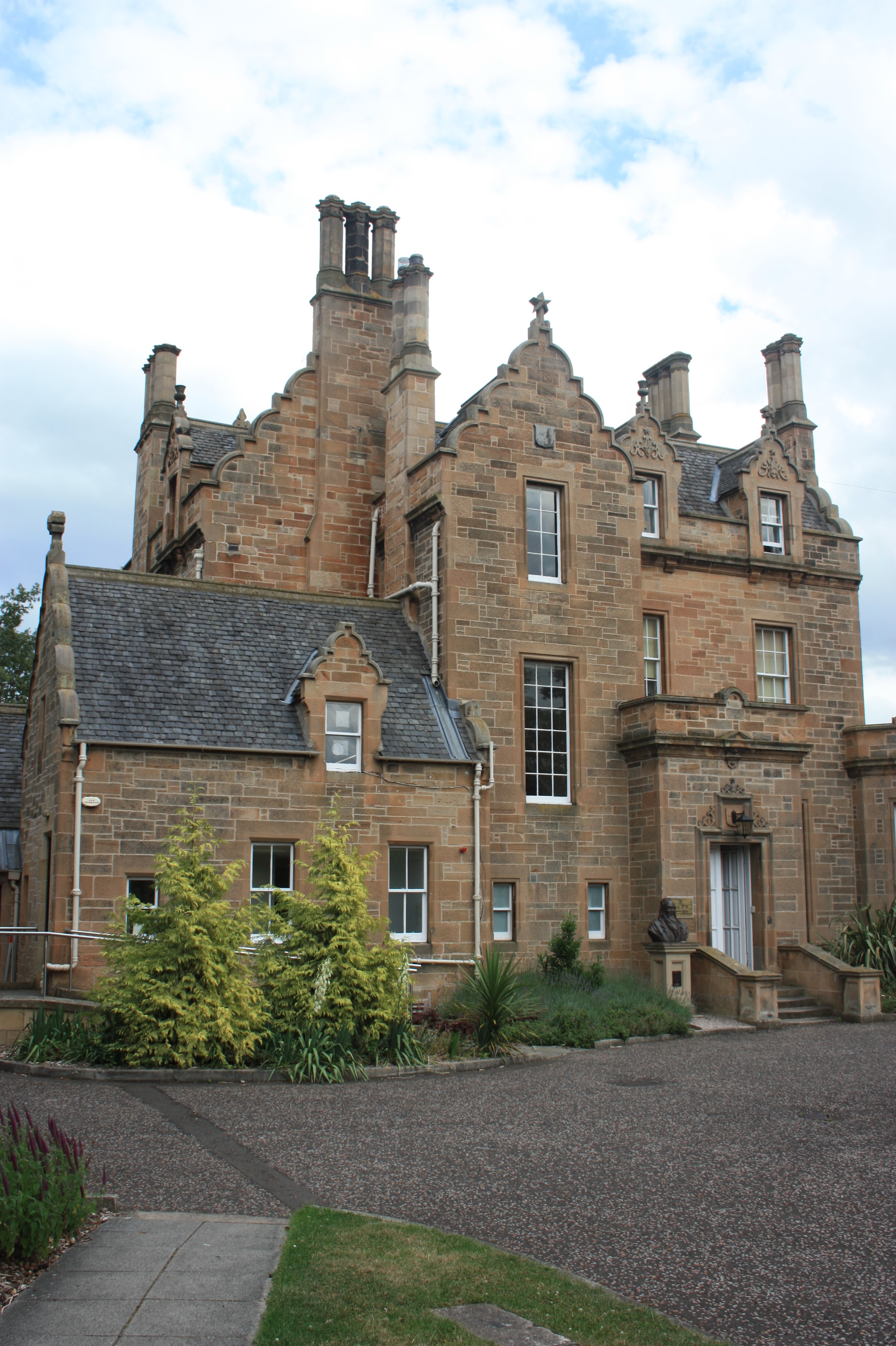
Abden House, Edinburgh

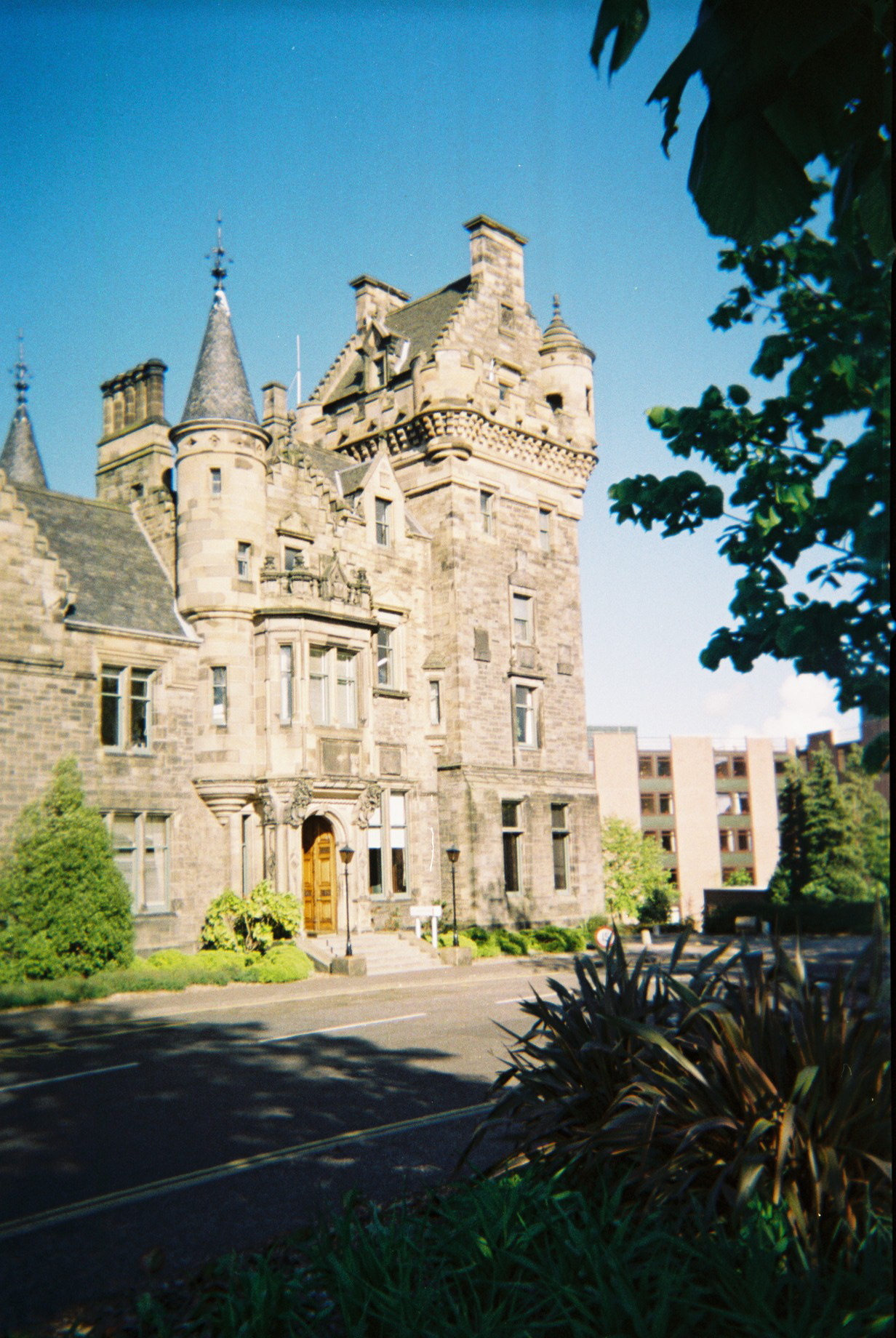
St Leonards

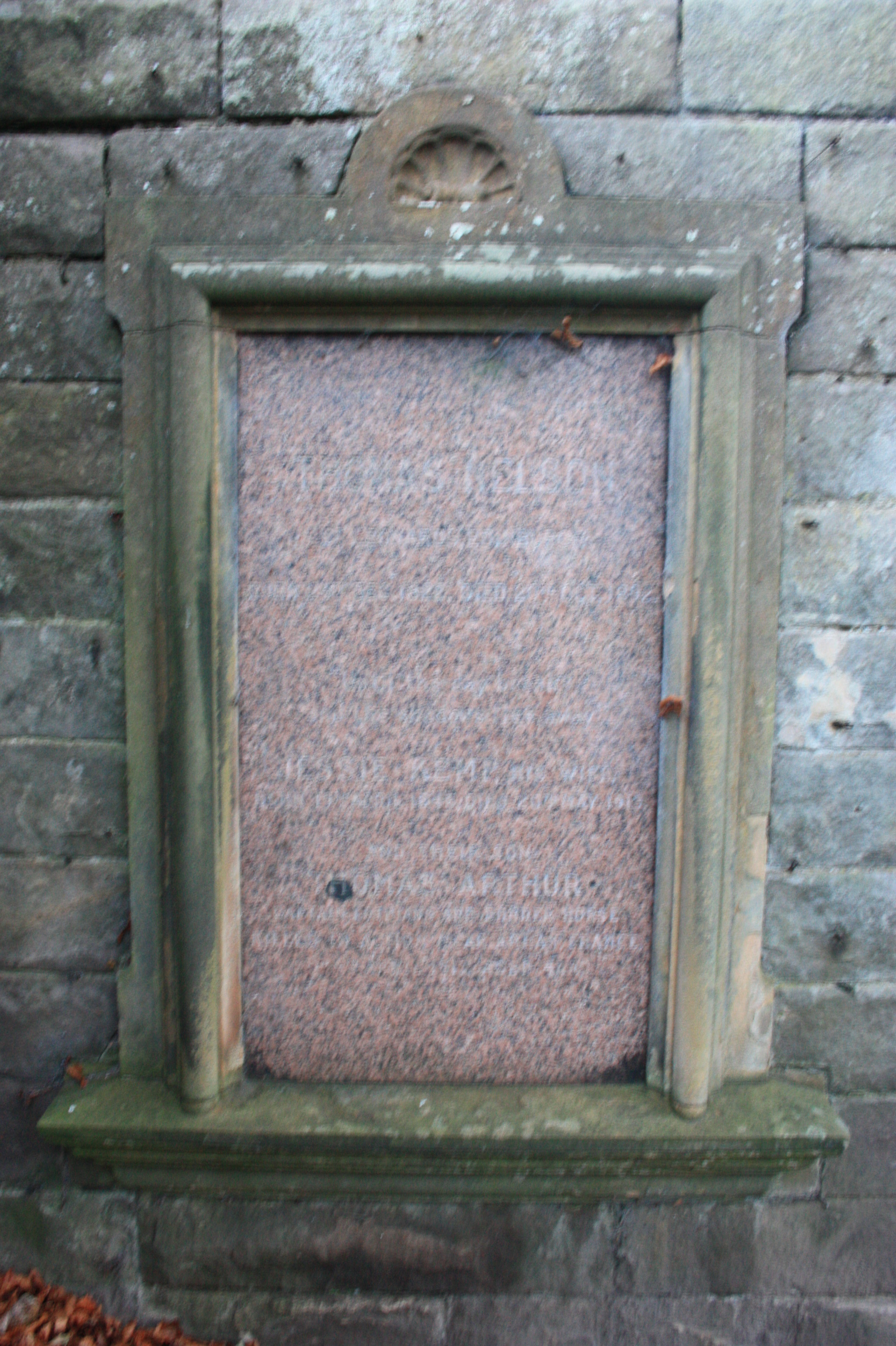
The grave of Thomas Nelson 1822 to 1892, Grange Cemetery, Edinburgh

He was born on 25 December, Christmas Day, 1822, son of Thomas Nelson then a bookseller, and his wife, Margaret Black. He was educated at the High School in Edinburgh.

Thomas joined his father's company on his 17th birthday in 1839. In 1844 the firm moved to larger premises in Hope Park in Edinburgh's South Side. The company began specialising in school text books. Thomas Junior moved to London in 1844 to open a new major branch there. He returned to Edinburgh in 1846.

From 1855 he lived with his father in the newly commissioned Abden House in Edinburgh's South Side, inheriting the house on his father's death in 1861.

In 1866 he was elected a Fellow of the Royal Society of Edinburgh. His proposer was Alexander Keith Johnston.

In 1869 Thomas commissioned John Lessels to build St Leonards, a very large baronial mansion close to his premises, built in the grounds of Abden House. The building now forms part of Edinburgh University's Pollock Halls of Residence.

He fell into ill-health in 1890 and died on 20 October 1892 leaving a fortune of over £1 million.

== Publications written by Nelson ==
- Waydside Flowers (1850)
- Blind Alice and her Benefactress (1851)
- The History of Alfred the Great (1851)
- The Life of Daniel (1851)
- The History of a Ship (1852)
- New Atlas of the World (1859)
- Memorials of Early Genius (1860)
- A Class Atlas of Ancient Geography (1867)

== Family ==
In 1868 he married Jessie Kemp (1846-1919) daughter of James Kemp of Manchester.

Their son Thomas Arthur Nelson was a Captain in the Lothians and Border Horse in the First World War and was killed at Arras in April 1917.
