= Thomas Nelson (publisher) =

American publishing firm

- Parent company: HarperCollins
- Founded: 1798; 1854 (US)
- Founder: Thomas Nelson
- Country of origin: Scotland
- Headquarters location: Nashville, Tennessee
- Key people: Mark Schoenwald (president & CEO); Doug Lockhart (senior vice president – Sales & Marketing)
- Publication types: Bibles, books, curriculum, digital content
- Revenue: ▲$237.8 million (2005)
- Owner: HarperCollins (News Corp)
- No. of employees: Approximately 450
- Official website: www.thomasnelson.com

Thomas Nelson is a publishing firm that began in West Bow, Edinburgh, Scotland, in 1798, as the namesake of its founder. It is a subsidiary of HarperCollins, the publishing unit of News Corp. It describes itself as a "world leading publisher and provider of Christian content".

Its most successful title to date is Heaven Is for Real. In Canada, the Nelson imprint is used for educational publishing. In the United Kingdom, it was an independent publisher until 1962, and later became part of the educational imprint Nelson Thornes.

== British history ==
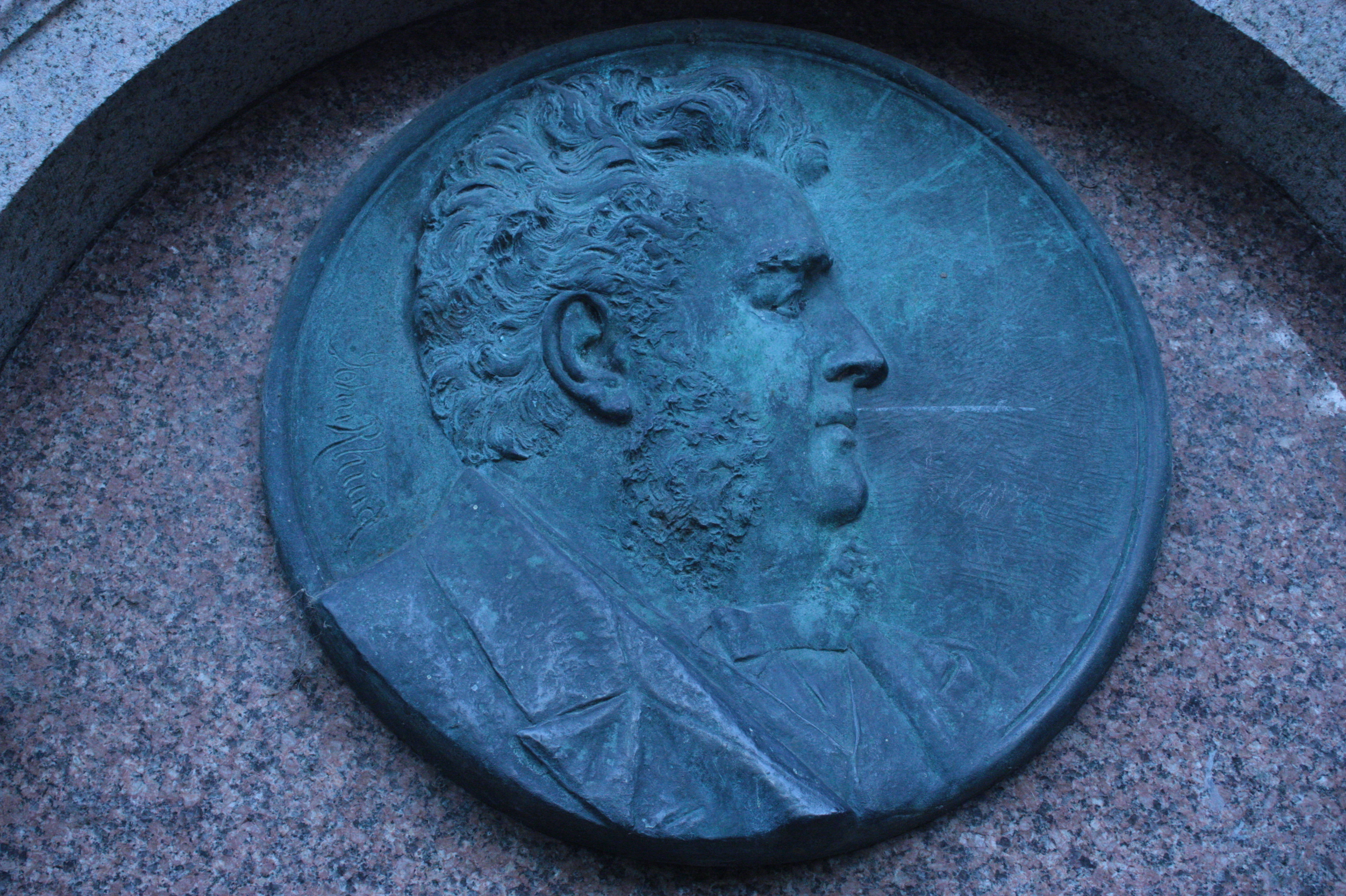
Memorial to Thomas Nelson at St Bernard's Well, Edinburgh by John Rhind

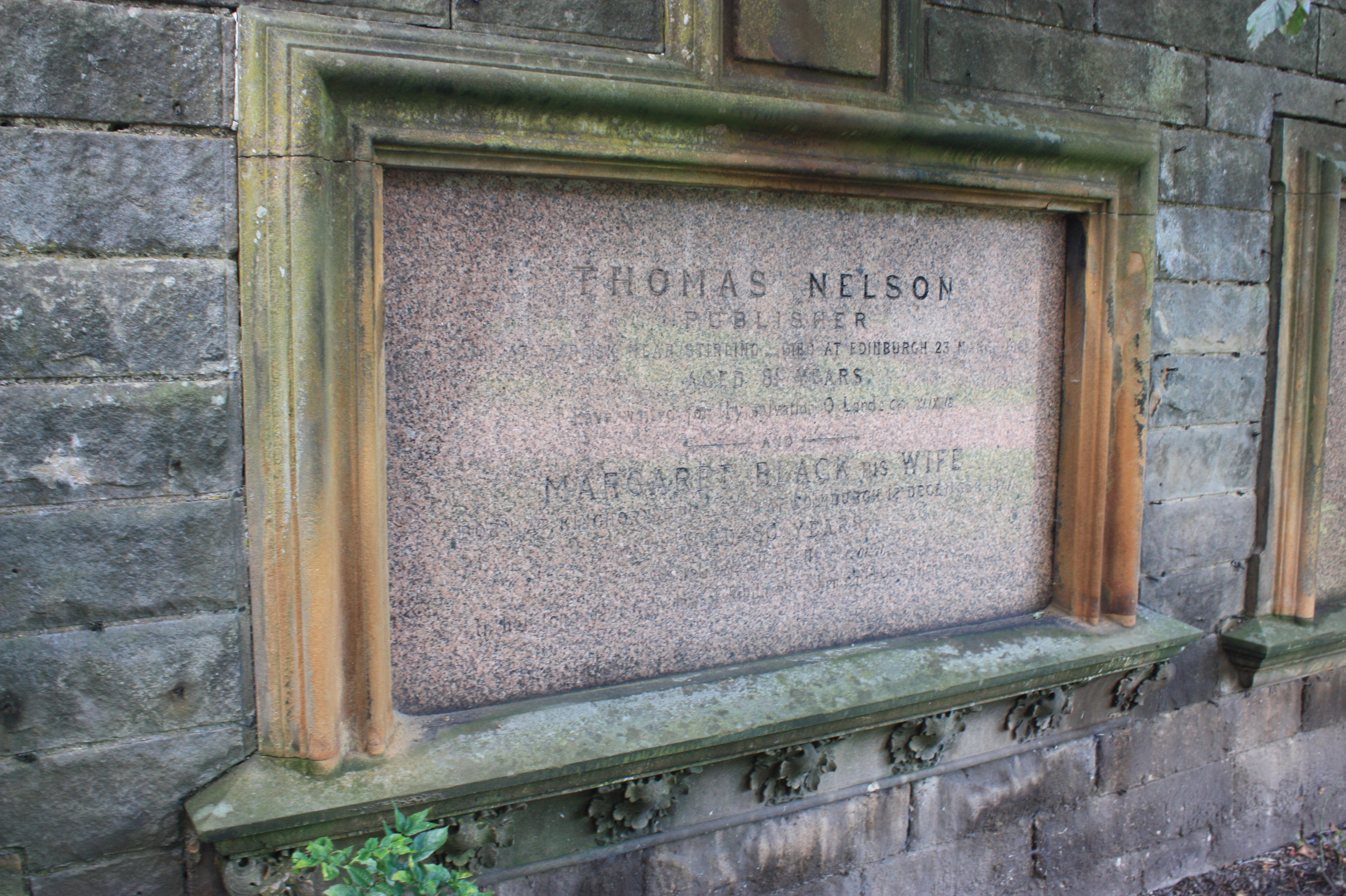
Grave of Thomas Nelson, Grange Cemetery, Edinburgh

Thomas Nelson Sr. founded the shop that bore his name in Edinburgh in 1798, originally as a second-hand bookshop at 2 West Bow, just off the city's Lawnmarket, recognizing a ready market for inexpensive, standard editions of non-copyright works, which he attempted to satisfy by publishing reprints of classics. By 1822, the shop had moved to 9 West Bow, and a second shop had opened at 230 High Street.

In 1835, the shop became a company, first as Thomas Nelson & Son when William joined, and in 1839 became Thomas Nelson & Sons when Thomas Jr. entered the business. Thomas Sr. died in 1861 and is buried in the extreme north-west corner of Grange Cemetery in Edinburgh. William concentrated his talents on the marketing side, and Thomas Jr. devoted his to editing and production. In the mid-19th century, Walter Scott Dalgleish was an editor with the company.

The firm became a publisher of new books and, as the 19th century progressed, it produced an increasingly wide range of non-religious materials; by 1881, religion accounted for less than 6 per cent of the firm's output. Its Hope Park Works, located just east of the Meadows in Edinburgh, burned down in 1878, and the city council allowed temporary accommodation on the Meadows. In appreciation, the company funded the stone pillars at the east end of Melville Drive, close to Hope Park.

William Nelson died in 1887, and Thomas Jr. died in 1892. They were succeeded by George Brown, Thomas's nephew, who directed the company until Thomas III and Ian, Thomas Jr.'s sons, joined him and John Buchan as partners. Buchan, employed by the firm until 1929, dedicated his novel The Thirty-Nine Steps to Thomas III (Thomas Arthur Nelson) in 1914.

In 1915, Thomas Nelson took over the art publishing house T.C. & E.C. Jack, based in Edinburgh and London. T.C. & E.C. Jack was founded in 1859 by Thomas Cheskolm Jack (1831–1886). After his death in 1886, his sons Thomas Chater Jack (1863–1939) and Edwin Chisholm Jack (1865–1939) took over the publishing house. T.C. & E.C. Jack was continued as an imprint by Thomas Nelson.

Ian Nelson took over as head of the family firm after Thomas Nelson III's death in action in 1917, during World War I.

By the early 20th century, Thomas Nelson had become a secular concern in the United Kingdom. The First World War led to the temporary rundown of Nelson through the denial of foreign markets, the loss of manpower (including the death of Thomas III), and the general exigencies of wartime, and initiated its long-term decline. Much of the effort expended during the inter-war period represented merely an attempt to reverse that decline, particularly in expanding the education list and reducing the dependence on reprints.

Ian Nelson remained head of the firm until his death in 1958. Ian Nelson's successor, his son Ronnie Nelson, seemed less interested in the successful management of the family firm than previous generations. In 1962, Thomas Nelson and Sons was absorbed into the Thomson Organisation in an effort to sustain its academic and educational publishing interests on a global scale. The presidency of the company then passed to Hubert Peter Morrison FRSE (who had been chairman since 1958). The printing division of Nelsons was sold to the Edinburgh company Morrison and Gibb in 1968.

Until 1968, according to the curators of a Senate House Library exhibition, the company "specialised in producing popular literature, children's books, bibles, religious works and educational texts." It was the first publisher for Sir Arthur Conan Doyle.

Thomson owned the company from 1960 until 2000. That year, it was acquired by Wolters Kluwer, who merged Nelson with its existing publishing arm, Stanley Thornes, to form Nelson Thornes.

== Original American history ==
The American branch of Thomas Nelson was established in 1854 in New York. In a December 1873 article on "Holiday Gifts" the New-York Tribune wrote:

Thomas Nelson & Sons, No. 42 Bleecker-st., devote themselves specially to the publications of the Oxford University Press, from which issues a superb variety of Bibles, Prayer-books, and Hymnals. They are printed in every imaginary style, and bound in plain cloth, in calf, in Morocco, in Russia, in velvet, and in ivory. Besides these books, Messrs. Nelson have an attractive miscellaneous stock, in which a great many children's books appear, and some fine illustrated volumes."

Nelson held the copyright for the American Standard Version of the Bible from 1901 until 1928 when it transferred the copyright to the International Council of Religious Education. In the 1930s, the company made a deal with this council (which later became part of the National Council of Churches) to publish the Revised Standard Version. The firm was sold to The Thomson Organization in 1960, and in 1962, the company failed to meet demand for this Bible translation. This, in turn, led the National Council of Churches to grant other publishers licenses for the work, leading to a dramatic fall in revenue for Nelson.

== Current United States company ==
In 1969, Sam Moore's publishing company, Royal Publishers, purchased Nelson. Moore retained the company's name and logo. In the 1960s, Thomas Nelson moved its headquarters from New York to Camden, New Jersey. It moved again to Nashville, Tennessee, in the 1970s. From 1979 to 1982, Nelson developed the New King James Version of the Bible (also known as the Revised Authorized Version) and under Moore began diversifying the company with a gift division.

In 1992, Nelson purchased the Word music and books brand from Capital Cities/ABC. In 1997, the company split the two, spinning off the record label and printed music division, one of the largest church music companies, to Gaylord Entertainment. This led to a lawsuit by Gaylord in 2001 over the Word name, and it was settled when Nelson renamed its book division the W Publishing Group. That year also led to a corporate expansion by the purchase of the Cool Springs and Rutledge Hill Press labels.

In 2003, World Bible Publishers was acquired by Nelson, and the fiction label WestBow Press made its debut (all books were later consolidated under the Nelson brand and WestBow Press was resurrected in 2009 to offer self-publishing services). Also, an imprint for Internet news source WorldNetDaily made its debut that year. The agreement dissolved, however, after 2004, and the former WND brand is now under the Nelson Current brand, including its authors.

Thomas Nelson, now based in Nashville, publishes Christian authors, including Billy Graham, Max Lucado, John Eldredge, John Maxwell, Charles Stanley, Michael A. O'Donnell, Ted Dekker, John Townsend, and Dave Stone. Thomas Nelson Inc. in 2000 began marketing the Women of Faith conference, a concept devised by author Stephen Arterburn in 1995, after attending a church conference in Atlanta. As of 2013, the annual Women of Faith conference was attended by more than 400,000 women. In 2005, Thomas Nelson launched the Revolve teen conferences, built on the Women of Faith model.

Michael S. Hyatt, a 25-year veteran of the publishing industry, became president and CEO of the company on 18 August 2005, succeeding Sam Moore who served as the company's CEO for nearly 47 years.

In 2006, the private equity firm InterMedia Partners and other investors agreed to buy Thomas Nelson for $473 million. The transaction closed on 12 June 2006. The company operated as a private company. In the same year, Nelson acquired Integrity Publishers from Integrity Media. In 2010, a group led by Kohlberg & Company bought a majority share of the company. In 2011, News Corporation subsidiary HarperCollins announced it had acquired Thomas Nelson. The acquisition closed in July 2012.

== Canadian history ==
When Thomson sold Thomas Nelson UK, it kept the Canadian operations of the publisher as part of the company's education division. Thomson acquired Irwin in 2002.

Thomson Education was spun off as Cengage Learning in the United States and Canada in 2007. The Nelson name lives on through the Canadian company Nelson Education Ltd., an educational publisher. In 2015, Nelson Education was handed over to debtholders, which included Ares Management, Citigroup, Mudrick Capital Management and Sound Point Capital Management. In 2017, McGraw-Hill Education sold its K-12 education holds of McGraw-Hill Ryerson (formerly Ryerson Press) to Nelson.

== See also ==
- Zondervan

== Bibliography ==
- Cumberland snaps up conservative-leaning series from Nelson in The Tennessean, 2004-10-19
- Private equity firm buying Thomas Nelson in Nashville Business Journal, 2006-02-21
- Dempster, John A. H., "Thomas Nelson and Sons in the Late Nineteenth Century: A Study in Motivation, Part One", in Publishing History, 13, 1983, pp. 41–87; "Part Two" in Publishing History, 14, 1983, pp. 5–63.
- Moore, Sam, American By Choice: The Remarkable Fulfilment of an Immigrant's Dreams, Nashville: Nelson, 1998.
- Tebbel, John, A History of Book Publishing in the United States, New York and London: Bowker, four volumes, 1972–1981.
