= Altona Christian Community =

- Hutterite Colony
- Location within Minnesota
- Coordinates: 44.526389°N 93.971944°W
- Country: USA
- State: Minnesota
- Branch: Independent Hutterite
- Status: Active
- Founded: 2001
- Excommunicated: 2003
- Mother Colony: Fordham Colony, SD

Population
  - Estimate: ~125

Altona Christian Community, called Altona Hutterite Colony by GAMEO, is an independent Anabaptist community of Hutterite tradition. Even though the majority of the members are ethnic Hutterites, there are also members from different other backgrounds in the community. They are located in rural Henderson, Minnesota. As of 2017 the minister is Richard Stahl and the secretary was Mark Wollman.

== History ==
Altona was founded in 2001 as a division from the Fordham Hutterite Colony in South Dakota, which was a Schmiedeleut Hutterite colony.

In 2003 Altona was excommunicated from Schmiedeleut affiliation with the Hutterites due to their continued support for their previously excommunicated sister church Elmendorf Christian Community.

In 2017 Altona and its excommunicated sister churches Fort Pitt and Elmendorf, along with Elmendorf's two daughter communities Detention River and Grand River, officially formed an independent Hutterite affiliation under the name Hutterite Christian Communities.

== Affiliation ==
Altona is affiliated with Elmendorf Christian Community and its daughter colonies and with Fort Pitt Farms Christian Community.

== Population ==
In early 2026, the community has a total of approximately 140 people.

== See also ==
- Caneyville Christian Community
- Believers in Christ, Lobelville
- Michigan Amish Churches
