= Elmendorf Christian Community =

- Hutterite Colony
- Location within Minnesota
- Coordinates: 43.866667°N 94.877778°W
- Country: USA
- State: Minnesota
- Branch: Independent Hutterite
- Status: Active
- Founded: 1994
- Excommunicated: 2003
- Mother Colony: Upland Colony, SD
- Daughter Colonies: List: Detention River, Australia; Grand River, MO

Population
  - Estimate: ~160

The Elmendorf Christian Community (or Elmendorf Hutterite Colony) is an independent Anabaptist community of Hutterite tradition. Even though the majority of the members are ethnic Hutterites, there are also members from other backgrounds in the community. They are located in rural Mountain Lake, Minnesota. As of 2026, the ministers are Gary Wurtz, Dwayne Wipf, and William Wurtz. William Wurtz is also the community secretary.

== History ==
The history of Elmendorf Christian Community goes back to the times of the Protestant Reformation, when Anabaptists under the leadership of Jakob Hutter established a community of goods in Moravia in the 1530s. After a long and complicated history of migrations in Eastern Europe, Hutterites arrived in America in 1874, forming three communities that practiced the community of goods, of which one was the Bon Homme Colony, the mother colony of all Schmiedeleut Hutterites. Because of population growth, Hutterite colonies frequently branched out to form new colonies.

Upland Hutterite Colony in Letcher, South Dakota, branched out in 1994 to form the Elmendorf Community. Upland had branched out of Spring Valley Hutterite Colony, located at Wessington Springs, South Dakota in 1988, Spring Valley had branched out of Platte Colony in 1964, and Platte had branched out of Bon Homme in 1949.

In 2003 Elmendorf was excommunicated from Schmiedeleut affiliation with the Hutterites and became an independent colony. It was soon followed by Altona, which was always in good standing with Elmendorf.

In 2006 Elmendorf Christian Community started a new community, named Detention River Christian Community, formerly known as Rocky Cape, between Smithton and Wynyard on the Australian island of Tasmania. In 2013/14, they started another new community, named Grand River, near the town of Jamesport in Missouri.

== Customs and belief ==
=== Belief ===
The doctrine of the Elmendorf Christian Community does not differ markedly from the doctrine of other Old Order or Conservative Anabaptists. Like other Hutterites, they believe in and practice the community of goods and separate from the world.

=== Plain dress ===
They reject fashions of the world in clothing and hairstyles, and the wearing of jewelry. Women are expected to wear long hair and to keep it covered, and not to wear trousers. Men and women are expected to dress in a "simple uniform way". In practice, their Plain dress is similar to the dress of other Schmiedeleut Hutterites.

=== Restrictions on technologies ===
Like other Hutterites, they have only a few restrictions on technology; they mainly forbid public television and are careful with digital technology. They pool their ownership of cars because they live in a community of goods. They operate their website.

=== Openness to outsiders ===
The Elmendorf Christian Community is much more open to outsiders, so-called seekers, than all other Hutterite communities. They welcome all visitors for at least one visit, but "subsequent visits of an extended or indefinite duration should be petitioned for and arranged." Besides Hutterisch, English is also spoken much more widely than in traditional Hutterite colonies, which makes it easier for visitors and joiners.

== Affiliation ==
They are affiliated with the Altona Christian Community at Henderson, Minnesota, and with the Fort Pitt Farms Christian Community. Elmendorf branched out to form Detention River Christian Community (formerly known as Rocky Cape) in Australia and Grand River Christian Community in Missouri. They do not belong to one of the four established Leut (branches) of ethnic Hutterites. Sometimes Elmendorf and Altona are listed as independent Schmiedeleut colonies and Fort Pitt is an independent Dariusleut colony, because this is where they originally came from.

The 2016 Hutterite Directory of the James Valley Hutterite Colony lists Elemendorf along with Altona, Fort Pitt, Grand River and Detention River as "Independent" Hutterites. These same five "Independent" Hutterite colonies compose a group of Hutterites known as the Hutterite Christian Communities, which Elmendorf is associated with.

== Population ==
In 2025, there were altogether some 170 people living in the community. In 2016, there were some 155 people living in Elmendorf, some 60 in Grand River, and some 25 in Detention River.

== See also ==
- Believers in Christ, Lobelville
- Caneyville Christian Community
- Christian Communities (Elmo Stoll)
- Michigan Amish Churches
