= Seeker (Anabaptism) =

Person likely to join an Old Order Anabaptist community

A Seeker is a person likely to join an Old Order Anabaptist community, like the Amish, the Old Order Mennonites, the Hutterites, the Old Order Schwarzenau Brethren or the Old Order River Brethren. Among the 500,000 members of such communities in the United States there are only an estimated 1,200 to 1,300 outsiders who have joined them.

A major obstacle for seekers is the language, because most Old Order communities speak German dialects like Pennsylvania German or Hutterite German in everyday life and in general will not give it up for seekers. Exceptions are the Old Order Mennonites of Virginia, the Old Order Schwarzenau Brethren and the Old Order River Brethren who speak English only.

On the other hand, Conservative Anabaptism (inclusive of the Dunkard Brethren Church and Conservative Mennonite denominations, including those of the Beachy Amish tradition) regularly receive seekers into their churches as visitors, and eventually, as members. Conservative Anabaptist fellowships are highly engaged in evangelism and missionary work, in addition to many congregations having an attached parochial school; a 1993 report showed that Conservative Anabaptist denominations grew overall by fifty percent within the previous fifteen years.

The majority of seekers are young adults who are attracted to "having a strong community, being serious about following the Bible and leading a Christian life and a commitment to modesty".

== Types of seekers ==
Stephen Scott, himself a convert to the Old Order River Brethren, distinguishes four types of seekers:

- Checklist seekers, who look for a couple of certain specifications.
- Cultural seekers, who are more enchanted with the lifestyle of the Amish than with their religion.
- Spiritual utopian seekers, who look for true New Testament Christianity.
- Stability seekers, who come with emotional issues, often from dysfunctional families.

== Seekers among the Old Order Amish ==
Only a few outsiders have ever joined the Old Order Amish. Since 1950 only some 75 people have joined and remained members of the Amish. Since 1990 some twenty people of Russian Mennonite background have joined the Amish in Aylmer, Ontario.

Two whole Christian communities have joined the Amish: The Church at Smyrna, Maine, one of the five Christian Communities of Elmo Stoll after Stoll's death and the Church at Manton, Michigan, which belonged to a community that was founded by Harry Wanner (1935–2012), a minister of Stauffer Old Order Mennonite background. The "Michigan Amish Churches", with which Smyrna and Manton affiliated, are said to be more open to seekers and converts than other Amish churches. Most of the members of these two Amish communities originally came from Plain churches, i. e. Old Order Amish, Old Order Mennonite or Old German Baptist Brethren, but others came from non-Amish backgrounds. Another seeker-friendly community in Maine, belonging to the Michigan Churches, is located at Unity, Maine.

It is stated that there are more people among the "Michigan Amish Churches" that feel sure to be saved or consider themselves to be born again Christians than among other subgroups of Old Order Amish, a fact that suits seekers. In accordance to that, G. C. Waldrep stated that the Michigan Churches show many spiritual and material similarities to the New Orders, while they are still technically considered a part of the larger Old Order group.

More people have tested Amish life for weeks, months or even years but in the end decided not to join. Others remain just close to the Amish and never thought of joining.

On the other hand, the Beachy Amish, many of whom conduct their services in English and allow for a limited range of modern conveniences, regularly receive seekers into their churches as visitors, and eventually, as members.

== Seekers among the Old Order Mennonites ==
There have been only very few seekers among the different groups of Old Order Mennonites, with one exception: the Noah Hoover Mennonites, who resemble the Amish in most outward aspects of life, like dress and the use of technology. Besides Standard German for Church and Bible reading, and Pennsylvania German in everyday life, English is also used in Church and among some members, most of them seekers, who have joined the Noah Hoovers, but without a general tendency of shifting to English. Stephan Scott writes:

Many people from various backgrounds have been attracted to the Noah Hoover group. The ultra-conservative stance on technology combined with firm Biblicism, intense spirituality, and high morals standards have had a wide appeal.

Contrary to popular belief Old Order groups do not simply stay as they always have been, but have to struggle in many ways to adapt to the modern world and to preserve traditions, that are important to them. Because the Noah Hoover Mennonites have such a complicated history of splits and mergers, they are unable to rely on tradition in the same way other conservative groups like e. g. the Swartzentruber Amish do, so they have had to find out in a longer process how they wish to live. This led to a community, that is more intentionalist-minded than ultra-traditional.

== Seekers among the Hutterites ==
Since the 17th century Hutterites in general have not engaged in active mission efforts. In customary Old Order fashion they see their role as model for Christian seekers, according to Matthew 5:16:

In the same way, let your light shine before others, so that they may see your good works and give glory to your Father who is in heaven.

They do not expect many people to join them. In general the more traditional Hutterites are, the less interested they are in evangelism. The Schmiedeleut 1 are more open to seekers than the other leut.

In 1972 the Dariusleut were joined by a group in Japan, the Owa Hutterite Colony. In the 1990s the Schmiedeleut 1 and the Bruderhof Communities helped a group in Palmgrove, Nigeria to establish communal living, but soon this affiliation failed.

The Elmendorf Christian Community, an independent community of Hutterite tradition, that separated from the Schmiedeleut in 2005, is even more open to seekers than the Schmiedeleut 1. The same is true for the four other Hutterite Christian Communities.

== Seekers among the Old Order Schwarzenau Brethren ==
There are five groups among the Schwarzenau Brethren which can be described as Old Order. These groups are the Old German Baptist Brethren, the Old Brethren, the Old Order German Baptist Brethren, the Old Brethren German Baptist and the Old German Baptist Brethren, New Conference. They range from horse and buggy groups to Plain dressing groups with few restrictions on technology (mainly television and internet).

Since they all have lost the German language and their German ethnic identity in the late 19th century, the cultural gap between these groups and the mainstream society is much smaller than in groups that have preserved their German heritage. They are all influenced by Pietism which brings their theology closer to the Protestant mainstream of the Great Awakenings. All these groups are quite open for outsiders and the larger ones of these groups do not consist largely of members with German roots anymore.

== Seekers among the Old Order River Brethren ==
There are three subgroups among the Old Order River Brethren, which are part of the Schwarzenau Brethren tradition of Anabaptism. Prominent personalities from the outside have joined them, like Stephen Scott and G. C. Waldrep.

== The Christian Communities of Elmo Stoll ==
Elmo Stoll, a former Old Order Amish bishop, founded the "Christian Communities" in 1990 to help seekers to join a Plain, horse-and-buggy, English-speaking community rooted in Anabaptism. Stoll died early in 1998 and the five "Christian Communities" he and his followers had established soon broke apart, one joining the Old Order Amish of the "Michigan Churches" affiliation and two joining the Noah Hoover Old Order Mennonites . A community in Kentucky of some 15 families, the Caneyville Christian Community, founded in 2004 by three men, among them one of Elmo Stoll's sons, still adheres to Elmo Stoll's vision. Both Elmo Stoll's Christian Communities and Caneyville Christian Community are classified as "para-Amish".

== Seekers among para-Amish groups ==
Since the 1960s groups similar to the Amish, called "para-Amish" by G. C. Waldrep, have arisen to embody their own vision of spiritual renewal in a framework similar to Old Order groups. These groups use horse-and-buggy and have restriction on technology comparable to other Old Order groups. These groups have attracted many spiritual seekers. Notable "para-Amish" groups are:

- The Believers in Christ at Lobelville, Tennessee, established in 1973 and still in existence.
- The community at Le Roy, Michigan, founded in 1981 by Harry Wanner, which also started a daughter settlement at Manton, Michigan. In the 1990s the group eroded and the community at Manton affiliated with the Michigan Amish Churches of the Amish, while the community at Leroy disbanded between 1995 and 1998.
- A church at Ghent, Kentucky, that was established in 1985 and resolved in 1996.
- Vernon Community at Hestand, Kentucky, founded in 1996 by Simon Beachy and his followers. Beachy was the leader in Lobelville and took his followers from there.

== See also ==
- "Russian" Mennonite
- Old Colony Mennonites
- Old Beachy Amish
- Community Farm of the Brethren

== Literature ==
- Jeff Smith: Becoming Amish: A family's journey of faith, community and purpose, Dance Hall Press, 2016.
- Cory Anderson: Religious Seekers’ Attraction to the Plain Mennonites and Amish, in Review of Religious Research, 2016, pages 125–147.
- Marlene C. Miller: Called to Be Amish: My Journey from Head Majorette to the Old Order, Harrisonburg, VA and Kitchener, Ontario 2015.
- Mary-Ann Kirkby: I Am Hutterite, Altona, Manitoba 2008, (The biography of a daughter of seekers who joined the Hutterites).
