= Christian Communities (Elmo Stoll) =

Former residential communities led by American bishop Elmo Stoll

The "Christian Communities" were Christian intentional communities with an Anabaptist worldview, founded and led by Elmo Stoll (1944 – 1998), a former Old Order Amish bishop. They were founded in 1990 and disbanded some two years after Stoll's early death in 1998. At the time of Stoll's death there were five "Christian Communities", four in the U.S. and one in Canada. G.C. Waldrep calls them "perhaps the most important "para-Amish" group".

== Elmo Stoll ==
Elmo Stoll of Aylmer, Ontario, born 1945, was ordained as an Amish minister in 1971 and as an Amish bishop in 1984. After becoming bishop, he moved the church towards more dress plainer and less use of modern technology, e. g. he forbade the use of electronic calculators. Moreover, he became an ardent preacher. He also wrote a regular column in the Amish magazine "Family Life", until he left the Amish and created the “Christian Communities”.

Elmo Stoll helped a young couple, seekers of French-Canadian background, Marc Villeneuve and his wife, to join the Amish community at Aylmer. This young man started to raise questions about several religious practices and was backed by Elmo's sons and more and more by Elmo himself. In December 1989 the ministers of the Aylmer Amish settlement met to discuss five issues, Elmo and his followers had raised: Evangelizing outside the Plain churches, the use of the English language to reach seekers, Christian community of goods (like the Hutterites), the mandatory wearing of hats for men and the question of fellowship with other plain churches. Elmo Stoll was favoring fellowship with the Noah Hoover Mennonites and the Orthodox Mennonites. No decision was made after this meeting. Elmo Stoll then explained his ideas in a series of letters, which collection was later titled Let Us Reason Together.

== Separation from the Amish ==
In July 1990 the disunion became strong enough that the other bishops of Aylmer consulted with outside bishops and the decision was made to let Elmo start a new community, separated from the Aylmer community. Elmo and his followers were not excommunicated, but it was not allowed that individuals could freely move between the two communities. So Elmo Stoll and his followers withdrew from the Amish church in Aylmer in September 1990 to organize a plain, horse-and-buggy, English-speaking community in Cookeville, Tennessee, that was rooted in Anabaptism. Cookeville was chosen because of its proximity to the like-minded Noah Hoover Mennonites in Scottsville, Kentucky.

Elmo Stoll intended to create a church mostly modeled on the Amish, but with community of goods and without the German language and other obstacles in order to help Christian seekers from a non-plain background to integrate into a very plain, low technology Christian life without materialism.

== The Christian Communities ==
Two hundred acres with a dilapidated barn on it were bought in Cookeville, Tennessee and on October 5, 1990, Elmo Stoll and like-minded families arrived there. In the beginning they lived in two small houses rented on a nearby farm. Building houses without modern appliances was hard and with the help of several men from nearby Noah Hoover Mennonites from Scottsville, they dug the basements and foundations by hand. There was no indoor plumbing; that is, no running water, no showers or bathtubs, and no toilets—instead there were outhouses.

From the beginning there was disunion among the members, because some members wanted communal living, with all meals shared, and only private rooms, while other members wanted private houses and meals, but still have a communal purse. In the end it was decided that each family would have its own household. Within months more and more people arrived, and in spring each family started to plant a market garden.

Even though officially there was no Ordnung (set of rules), the people of the Christian Community at Cookeville dressed very plain, but somewhat distinctive from the Amish. The men wore collarless shirts, suspenders, and untrimmed beards with mustaches. Hats for men were allowed, but strongly discouraged. The women wore some kind of kerchiefs instead of bonnets, and plain dresses with capes. Cars were forbidden, but bicycles were allowed. Power tools and other modern equipment, for example gasoline engines, were also not allowed.

Stoll's charisma and the spiritual and theological openness of the group not only attracted Amish and people with an Old Order Mennonite or an Old German Baptist background, but also dozens of families and individuals from non-plain churches. The community at Cookeville had to struggle to accommodate all the visitors, who wanted to move in.

The emphasis on voluntary poverty and the community of goods in the beginning made it impossible to save money to buy more land in other locations. Therefore the community of goods was soon abandoned and the community could spread to other places. When Elmo Stoll died in 1998, there were five like-minded Christian Communities:

- Cookeville, Tennessee (founded in 1990),
- Decatur, Tennessee (founded in 1993),
- Woodstock, New Brunswick in Canada (founded in 1994),
- Holland, Kentucky (founded in 1996) and
- Smyrna, Maine (founded in 1996).

After the early death of Elmo Stoll from heart failure, two of the "Christian Communities", Cookeville and Woodstock, disbanded while the one in Holland, KY, and part of the one in Decatur, who moved to Delano, Tennessee, joined the Noah Hoover Mennonites, a very plain horse and buggy Old Order group, that is rather more intentionalist minded than traditional. The community in Smyrna, after having lost most of its members without Amish background, developed a fellowship with an Amish community in Manton, Michigan, which is affiliated with the Michigan Amish Churches. The community in Smyrna, which became Amish, was the first Amish community in Maine. Several of Elmo Stoll's sons, and others with Amish background, returned to the Amish community in Aylmer, Ontario.

A community in Kentucky of some 15 families, the Caneyville Christian Community, was founded in 2004 by three men, among them one of Elmo Stoll's sons, in an effort to keep Elmo Stoll's vision alive.

== Publishing ==
Between 1991 and 1998 the Christian Communities at Cookeville published a small, bimonthly pamphlet, called "The Update", which contained lengthy "community news", columns, letters (both approving and critical) and long articles on faith and practice written by Elmo Stoll and other ministers. Very important for the community were two books written by Elmo Stoll: Let Us Reason Together (1990) and Why We Live Simply (1996).

In 1998, Stoll contributed an essay, "Better than Fixing Things," to The Plain Reader: Essays on Making a Simple Life, which brought his views to a wider audience in the United States.

== See also ==
- Hutterite Christian Communities
- Believers in Christ, Lobelville
- Michigan Amish Churches

== Literature ==
- Bryce Geiser: The Christian Communities: A Brotherhood of Covenant and Commitment, in Old Order Notes 20, (Spring Summer 2000), pages 7–22.
- George Calvin Waldrep: The New Order Amish And Para-Amish Groups: Spiritual Renewal Within Tradition, in The Mennonite Quarterly Review 82 (2008), pages 395-426.
- Richard A. Pride: Elmo Stoll and the Christian Community at Cookeville, in Border States: Journal of the Kentucky Tennessee American Studies Association, Volume 14 : 2003, pages 36-49.
- Joseph Donnermeyer and Cory Anderson: The Growth of Amish and Plain Anabaptists in Kentuck, in Journal of Amish and Plain Anabaptist Studies 2(2):215, pages 215-244, 2014.
- Ira Wagler: The Life of Elmo Stoll: The Shepherd at Dawn: The Early Years.
- Ira Wagler: The Life of Elmo Stoll: The Shepherd at Noon: Empire & Exodus.
- Ira Wagler: The Life of Elmo Stoll: The Shepherd at Dusk: His Vision & Legacy.
