= Peter Hoover =

Peter Hoover (born 18 May 1960) is an author familiar to many conservative Christians of Anabaptist and similar heritage in the United States, Canada, Central America, Australia, and western Europe.

== Life ==
Peter Hoover is the son of prominent Mennonite minister Anson Hoover (1920–2008) and his wife Sarah (Martin) Hoover (1923–2015; daughter of Selina: 1898–1989 and Manoah: 1899–1975 ). He was born in Kitchener, Ontario, as the sixth and last child of his parents. He is married to Susan (Krahn) Hoover and has had seven children with her. The couple adopted two additional children from Mexico. He has worked in Canada, Mexico, Costa Rica, United States, Chile, and Australia.

In 2006, Hoover was featured on the American television program, Dr. Phil, for his involvement in an effort to find and recover the children of an American mother whose father was concealing them in a Christian community in Belize.

In 2010, Hoover had a benign brain tumor. It was surgically removed in the Royal Hobart Hospital on 14 July, taking away much of his ability to read and write. In his email newsletters at the time, which were sometimes rambling due to his disease, he spoke of what he believed was his imminent death. This proved not to be the case as he later regained many of his former abilities, aided by a screen reader.

In 2018, Hoover left the Detention River Christian Community and joined City Light Christian Fellowship, in Waynesboro, Pennsylvania.

== Writings ==
Hoover's books have focused on the stories of Christians in recent centuries who have most closely reflected the relationships, values, zeal and impact that Christians had claimed in the New Testament and ante-Nicene period. His books include Secret of the Strength (What Would the Anabaptists Tell This Generation?), which is published in English , a German edition in Europe (as Feuertaufe. Das radikale Leben der Täufer. Eine Provokation) , and an online Spanish edition. Also, he has written Behold the Lamb (The Story of the Moravian Church), and The Russians' Secret (What Christians Today Would Survive Persecution?), and The Mystery of the Mark: Anabaptist Missions under the Fire of God .

In Radical Anabaptists Today (online in five parts) he tells the story of the Wanner family, a family in search of the true church in the environment in which the Noah Hoover Mennonites, the Orthodox Mennonites, the "Christian Communities" of Elmo Stoll emerged.

== See also ==
- Restorationism (Christian primitivism)
- Hutterite Christian Communities
