= Elmo Stoll =

American Amish bishop (1944–1998)

Elmo Stoll (March 5, 1944 – September 2, 1998) was a former Old Order Amish bishop, writer and founder of the "Christian Communities". He was one of the few Amish who "have risen to prominence over the years".

== Life ==
Elmo Stoll was born in Litchfield, Michigan, son of Peter and Anna Stoll, née Wagler. He was one of eleven children. Elmo still being a small child, his family moved to Piketon, Ohio, and then, in the early 1950, to a new Amish settlement of Aylmer, Ontario. In 1966 and '67 he was a teacher in a Beachy Amish school in Wellesley, Ontario. In 1968 he did not follow his family, who moved to Honduras, but stayed in Ontario, where he worked for Pathway Publishers. On June 4, 1970, he married Elizabeth Miller. He was ordained by lot as an Amish minister on April 14, 1971. He was ordained bishop by lot on October 10, 1984, and as such he forced the members of his church to dress plainer and he also enforced other changes in the direction of stricter plainness and less technology, e.g., he forbade the use of electronic calculators. Moreover, he became an ardent preacher. He also wrote a regular column in the Amish magazine Family Life, until he left the Amish and created the "Christian Communities".

Elmo Stoll helped a young couple, seekers of French-Canadian background, Marc Villeneuve and his wife, to join the Amish community at Aylmer. This young man started to raise questions about several religious practices and was backed by Elmo's sons and more and more by Elmo himself. In December 1989 the ministers of the Aylmer Amish settlement met to discuss five issues, Elmo and his followers had raised: Evangelizing outside the Plain churches, the use of the English language to reach seekers, Christian community of goods (like the Hutterites), the mandatory wearing of hats for men and the question of fellowship with other plain churches. Elmo Stoll was favoring fellowship with the Noah Hoover Mennonites and the Orthodox Mennonites. No decision was made after this meeting. Elmo Stoll then explained his ideas in the Book Let us reason together.

In July 1990 the real crisis came. Elmo, being a bishop of the Ayler community, challenged the Ordnung (set of rules of the community). The other bishops of Aylmer consulted with outside bishops and the decision was made to let Elmo start a new community, separated from the Aylmer community. Elmo and his followers were not excommunicated, but it was not allowed that individuals could freely move between the two communities. So Elmo Stoll and his followers withdrew from the Amish church in Aylmer in September 1990 to organize a plain, horse-and-buggy, English-speaking community in Cookeville, Tennessee, that should be rooted in Anabaptism. Cookeville was chosen because of its proximity to the like-minded Noah Hoover Mennonites in Scottsville, Kentucky

== "Christian Communities" ==
In 1990 Elmo Stoll founded an intentional community in Cookeville, Tennessee, called "Christian Community", that spread to other places. When Elmo Stoll died in 1998, there were five "Christian Communities": Cookeville, Tennessee; Decatur, Tennessee; Holland, Kentucky; Smyrna, Maine; and Woodstock, New Brunswick, Canada. Not only Amish people, but also people with an Old Order Mennonite or an Old German Baptist background, as well as people from non-plain churches, were attracted by the "Christian Communities". After the early death of Elmo Stoll by heart failure, two of the "Christian Communities" disbanded while the one in Holland, Kentucky, and part of the one in Decatur, who moved to Delano, Tennessee, joined the Noah Hoover Mennonites, a very plain horse and buggy Old Order group, that is rather intentionalist minded than traditional. The community in Smyrna, after having lost most of its members without Amish background, developed a fellowship with an Amish community of the Michigan Amish Churches in Manton, Michigan. Some of Elmo Stoll's sons and others with Amish background returned to the Amish community in Aylmer, Ontario.

The Caneyville Christian Community, founded in 2004 by a former bishop of Elmo Stoll's "Christian Communities" and one of his sons, still adheres to Elmo Stoll's vision.

== Family ==
Parts of Elmo Stoll's family, including his elder brother Joseph Stoll, went to Honduras in the late 1960s to establish an Amish settlement there, but most of the Amish settlers returned to North America several years later. Joseph Stoll was one of the two founders of Pathway Publishers and is author of several books. Elmo was the cousin of bestselling author Ira Wagler (Growing Up Amish: A Memoir). A nephew of Elmo, Jerry S. Eicher, is also the writer of several books.

== Works ==
- ——; Weaver, Sarah M. (1969). The midnight test. Pathway Publishers. OCLC 7928760.
- ——; Miller, Elizabeth Russell (1972). No empty seal. Pathway Publishers. OCLC 10652398.
- —— (1972). One-way street. Pathway Publishers. OCLC 10652775.
- ——; Stoll, Mark (1980). Pioneer catalogue of country living. Rexdale, Ont., CA: Personal Library Publishers : John Wiley and Sons Canada Ltd. ISBN 0-920510-13-2. OCLC 7402637.
- —— (1990). Let us reason together. E. Stoll. OCLC 27457253.
- ——; Stoll, Joseph; Luthy, David (1995). Our Heritage. Pathway Reading Series. Pathyway Publishing. ASIN B000QDQWB2.
- —— (1996). Why we live simply. Christian Community. OCLC 38887660.
- —— (1999). Give me this mountain : a selection of Views & Values. Published by the author's family. OCLC 43673080.
