= Mountain Lake Site =

- U.S. National Register of Historic Places
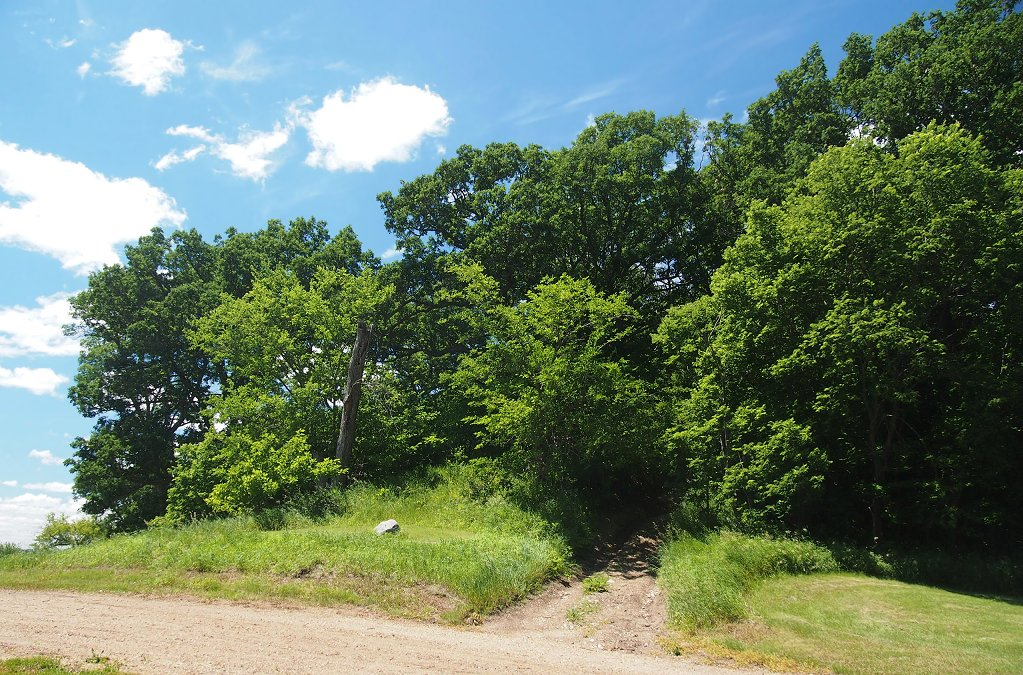
- The base of the bluff below the Mountain Lake Site

- Location within Minnesota Location within the United States
- Location: 59501 390th Street, Mountain Lake Township, Minnesota
- Coordinates: 43°55′13″N 94°53′26″W
- Area: 80 acres (32 ha)
- NRHP reference No.: 73000973
- Designated: April 18, 1977

The Mountain Lake Site (Smithsonian trinomial: 21CO01) is an archaeological site in Mountain Lake Township, Minnesota, United States. It is a deeply stratified village site spanning the precontact era from the late Archaic to an Oneota occupation, with a particular concentration of Woodland period ceramics. The site is atop a hill that was formerly an island in a lake. The site was listed on the National Register of Historic Places in 1977 for its state significance in the theme of archaeology.

In the late 1970s the site was developed into Mountain County Park, a public park operated by Cottonwood County.

== Indigenous occupation ==
Cottonwood County's now-dry Mountain Lake was the site of Native American villages and encampments over the course of 3,000 years. The area has provided clues—some of the oldest evidence of human habitation in present-day Minnesota—about the lives of a group of people who remained relatively isolated from Upper Mississippi River trade networks.

Named by William Mason for the raised island in its center, Mountain Lake shows a near-continuous record of human activity stretching back 3,000 years. In 1976, an archeological team led by Joseph Hudak carrying out a dig there found traces of an ancient village. Carbon dating determined the remains of a round dwelling on the site to be roughly 2,100 years old, making it the oldest dwelling yet found in Minnesota. The amount of material uncovered on the dwelling site indicated that it had been used for only one winter season, making it a remarkably intact snapshot of life in the Middle Woodland period.

Because shards of decorated pottery from the village site are similar to those found on nearby islands, archaeologists have identified the Mountain Lake village as part of the Fox Lake focus, named for a nearby village site on Fox Lake. The Fox Lake people lived on islands in present-day Southwestern Minnesota from approximately 100 BCE to 850 CE, hunted bison, and had a unique style of pottery featuring wide mouths and impressions made with cord-wrapped paddles.

The Fox Lake people seem to have used items like certain types of hide scrapers and crushed-shell pottery later than groups to the east, indicating that they remained isolated from the river trade routes used by the Oneota culture. Anthropologist Karl Schlesier has found evidence that the Fox Lake group—possible ancestors of Crow and Hidatsa people—later migrated northwest into present-day central North Dakota. Artifacts like crushed shell pottery and certain types of hide scrapers indicate that the Mountain Lake area was eventually inhabited by Oneota groups, whose descendants include the Ho-Chunk, Otoe, Iowa, and Missouria.

== Post-colonial history ==
In the 1870s and 1880s, Mountain Island was a source of wood fuel for the settler-colonists who moved to Cottonwood County. In the early 1890s, it seemed an ideal place for a summer resort. However, the lowland area surrounding the lake was swampy, and the island was difficult to reach. Mountain Lake was drained between 1905 and 1906 for additional farmland, and farmers raised produce on the fertile lakebed for the next several decades. A road was built to provide access to the former island.

Interest in the hill grew in the 1950s when flint arrowheads were found by Sam Franz, whose father owned the farmland surrounding the old island. Excavations at the site led by Lloyd Wilford in 1956 uncovered a "deeply stratified village site" and indicators that it had been occupied from the Late Archaic through the Middle Woodland periods. Further excavations by Wilford seven years later identified similarities in the form of arrowheads and pottery with nearby sites.

As a result of these surveys, Mountain Park was placed on the National Register of Historic Places on June 4, 1973. To prevent damage to the culturally significant site, construction of campground facilities was kept to the side of the island, which had previously been submerged. Some of the dig's findings were displayed at the Science Museum of Minnesota in Saint Paul; a replica of the round dwelling and some of the artifacts found at the site were also displayed at Heritage House in Mountain Lake.

Cottonwood County bought Mountain Park from the Franz family in November 1976, and major development proceeded in 1979 with the assistance of the Law and Conservation Fund (LAWCON). Roads, toilets, trails, a picnic shelter, entry signage, and a well were built at a cost of $31,000 (equivalent to $137,517 in 2025).

The undeveloped rise of the former island at Mountain Park is a convenient site for observing wildlife and birds of many species. Visitors can view a wide array of wildlife in this relatively undisturbed area and enjoy campgrounds and picnic sites nearby.

== See also ==
- National Register of Historic Places listings in Cottonwood County, Minnesota
