= Vernon Community, Hestand =

Vernon Community in Hestand, Kentucky, is home to an Anabaptist Christian community, that was founded in 1996 by Simon Beachy, former leader of the "Believers in Christ" in Lobelville, Tennessee. The Christian community is classified as "para-Amish" by G.C. Waldrep, adhering to plain dress using horse and buggy for transportation.

== History ==
In 1973, families from a small Reformed Amish Church in Arkansas founded a community at Lobelville, Tennessee, later called "Believers in Christ". The intention was to create a heartfelt primitive Christianity like in the beginning of the Anabaptist movement. The community attracted many people from Amish, Old Order Mennonite, Old German Baptist backgrounds as well as people from non-plain churches, so-called seekers.

The group struggled to hold together until Simon Beachy, a charismatic personality of Old Order Amish background, arrived. Beachy's central theme was "true brokenness". Beachy also rejected the idea of having an Ordnung (set of rules) like almost all other Old Order communities. In 1996 Beachy left the community at Lobelville to create a new one at Hestand with hand-picked followers.

== Customs and belief ==
The Christian community at Hestand is an independent community with many Amish features, like Plain dress, horse and buggy transportation, no telephones, etc., but without fellowship with other Amish communities. It has a "lower strictness level" than the Noah Hoover Mennonites of Scottsville, Kentucky, or the Caneyville Christian Community.

A member of the community, Ruben Schwartz, known as "Dr. Ruben" is an alternative medicine practitioner who works with herbs and iridology. The community lives off market gardens, sorghum syrup production and other goods they sell.

== Population ==
As of 2005, there were 32 families in the community. In 2020, there were 364 adherents, that is members, not yet baptized youths and children of the "Believers in Christ," that is the Vernon Community, in Monroe County, Kentucky, where Hestand is located. This would indicate some 50 families.

== Literature ==
- George Calvin Waldrep: The New Order Amish And Para-Amish Groups: Spiritual Renewal Within Tradition, in The Mennonite Quarterly Review 82 (2008), pages 395–426.
- Joseph Donnermeyer and Cory Anderson: The Growth of Amish and Plain Anabaptists in Kentucky, in Journal of Amish and Plain Anabaptist Studies 2(2):215, pages 215-244, 2014.
