= Plain clothing =

Plain clothing may refer to:

- Plain dress, the dress of Anabaptist groups like the Amish
- Undercover operation, an operation to avoid detection
