= Fort Pitt Farms Christian Community =

Fort Pitt
- Hutterite Colony
- Fort Pitt Farms Christian Community
- Location within Saskatchewan
- Coordinates: 53.579167°N 109.801944°W
- Country: Canada
- Province: Saskatchewan
- Branch: Independent Hutterite
- Status: Active
- Founded: 1969
- Excommunicated: 1999
- Mother Colony: Ribstone Colony, AB
- Daughter Colonies: List: Green Leaf Colony, SK; Milligan Creek Colony, BC; Northshore Christian Community[[Saskatchewan]SK]

Population
  - Estimate: ~190

Fort Pitt Farms Christian Community is a Hutterite Christian Community of Dariusleut Hutterite origin and of many Hutterite traditions. It has been fully autonomous since 1999. It is located in Saskatchewan, near Lloydminster, in the Rural Municipality of Frenchman Butte No. 501, close to the Fort Pitt Provincial Park. Its spiritual leaders are Reuben Walter and Ben Walter.

What today is Fort Pitt Farms Christian Community was founded in 1969 as a Hutterite colony, a division from the Ribstone Hutterite Colony. When the Fort Pitt Hutterite Colony was excommunicated from the Hutterite church in 1999, about one-third of the people of the colony decided to stay with the Dariusleut Hutterites. The colony then established another colony, Greenleaf Hutterite Colony, Marcelin, Saskatchewan, to accommodate those who wished to stay with the Hutterite Church.

In early 2026, there are about 190 people living in Fort Pitt Farms Christian Community, mostly of ethnic Hutterite background.

Fort Pitt Farms is affiliated with Elmendorf Christian Community and its daughter colony Grand River in Missouri and also with the Altona Christian Community at Henderson, Minnesota.

== See also ==
- Elmendorf Christian Community
- Altona Christian Community
- Hutterite Christian Communities
- Intentional communities
