= Upland Colony, South Dakota =

- Census-designated place
- Location within South Dakota Location within the United States
- Coordinates: 43°52′37″N 97°58′34″W
- Country: United States
- State: South Dakota
- County: Sanborn

Area
  - Total: 0.19 sq mi (0.48 km^{2})
  - Land: 0.19 sq mi (0.48 km^{2})
  - Water: 0.0039 sq mi (0.01 km^{2})
- Elevation: 1,299 ft (396 m)

Population (2020)
  - Total: 178
  - Density: 961.6/sq mi (371.27/km^{2})
- Time zone: UTC-6 (Central (CST))
  - Summer (DST): UTC-5 (CDT)
- ZIP Code: 57314 (Artesian)
- Area code: 605
- FIPS code: 46-65628
- GNIS feature ID: 2813058

Upland Colony is a census-designated place (CDP) and Hutterite colony in Sanborn County, South Dakota, United States. It was first listed as a CDP prior to the 2020 census. The population of the CDP was 178 at the 2020 census.

It is in the southeast part of the county, on high ground overlooking the James River valley to the west. It is 9 miles (14 km) east of Letcher and 11 miles (18 km) south-southwest of Artesian.

== Demographics ==
Historical population
Census	Pop.	Note	%±
2020	178		—
U.S. Decennial Census
