= Fordham Colony, South Dakota =

- Census-designated place
- Location within South Dakota Location within the United States
- Coordinates: 44°46′04″N 97°54′25″W
- Country: United States
- State: South Dakota
- County: Clark

Area
  - Total: 0.41 sq mi (1.06 km^{2})
  - Land: 0.41 sq mi (1.06 km^{2})
  - Water: 0 sq mi (0.00 km^{2})
- Elevation: 1,473 ft (449 m)

Population (2020)
  - Total: 0
  - Density: 0/sq mi (0/km^{2})
- Time zone: UTC-6 (Central (CST))
  - Summer (DST): UTC-5 (CDT)
- ZIP Code: 57258 (Raymond)
- Area code: 605
- FIPS code: 46-22070
- GNIS feature ID: 2813007

Fordham Colony is a Hutterite colony and census-designated place (CDP) in Clark County, South Dakota, United States. The population was 0 at the 2020 census. It was first listed as a CDP prior to the 2020 census.

It is in the western part of the county, 17 miles (27 km) southwest of Clark, the county seat.

== Demographics ==
Historical population
Census	Pop.	Note	%±
2020	0		—
U.S. Decennial Census
