= Caneyville Christian Community =

Anabaptist community in Kentucky, US

The Caneyville Christian Community was an Anabaptist community, located in Caneyville, Kentucky, living a plain conservative lifestyle, true to the vision of former Old Order Amish bishop Elmo Stoll. G. C. Waldrep classifies them as "para-Amish". Among Anabaptists the community is often simply called "Caneyville".

In 2021, both settlements of the Community, Caneyville and Brownsville, ended their independence and joined the Michigan Churches affiliation of the Old Order Amish. Later, Brownsville disbanded entirely, and Caneyville began affiliation with Blessed Hope Christian Fellowship near Windsor, Kentucky. Blessed Hope Christian Fellowship is an offshoot of the churches originally associated with Charity Christian Fellowship.

== History ==
In 1990, the "Christian Communities" were founded in Cookeville, Tennessee, by Elmo Stoll, a former bishop of the Old Order Amish in Aylmer, Ontario. Stoll's aim was to create a church mostly modeled on the Amish, but with community of goods and without the German language and other obstacles in order to help Christian seekers from a non-plain background to integrate into a very plain, low technology Christian life without materialism. He was successful in establishing a community, but without community of goods, and soon many people from Amish, Old Order Mennonite and German Baptist Brethren backgrounds, but also - as intended - seekers joined his community. In addition, the "Christian Communities" soon spread to other locations in the United States and Canada. Elmo Stoll was the charismatic leader of the communities who held them together.

After Elmo Stoll's early death in 1998, disunion started among the "Christian Communities". Bryce Geiser, who has a German Baptist background, replaced Elmo Stoll as the leader of the "Christian Communities", but he could not hold together all the different people from different backgrounds. In 2001 the five congregations of the "Christian Communities" announced that they would disband the Cookeville community and the movement as a whole. That led in the end to the disbanding of two of the five "Christian Communities", while two others joined the Noah Hoover Mennonites and one affiliated with an Amish group from Michigan.

In 2004, Bryce Geiser, Andrew Hess and Aaron Stoll, a son of Elmo Stoll, started anew and founded the Christian Community at Caneyville, Kentucky, in order not to give up Elmo Stoll's vision.

== Customs and belief ==
Caneyville was an Old Order community, meaning that they used horses and buggies instead of cars, dressed Plain and avoided electricity, computers, cell phones, and other modern conveniences. Internal combustion engines were also not used, but steam engines instead. They used wood stoves, which the community makes, and many things were propane powered, as is the custom among many Amish. The community makes a living mainly from market gardens and the manufacture of wood stoves. They originally adhered to Elmo Stoll's vision.

Donnermeyer and Anderson describe the Community as follows:

The group's temperament is intentionalist, non-traditional, and inventive, yet all within a rationalized discourse supporting their ritual procedures, doctrinal expositions, and strict technological, dress, and home décor standards.

== Population and communities ==
The community started with about 15 families on a 200-acre (0.81 km^{2}) property. The original members did not all have an Old Order background, but came from Amish, German Baptist Brethren, and "seeker" backgrounds. Caneyville established a daughter community near Brownsville, Kentucky, some 30 miles (48 km) away. The Brownsville community disbanded after several years.

Currently, Caneyville has adapted the use of community vehicles and electricity in the homes. Inter-communal transportation includes golf carts and utility vehicles. "Blackbox" phones and email-to-fax services have been incorporated into daily use. The community still operates with the original vision concerning land ownership and business.

== Publishing ==
A bi-monthly pamphlet, called "Plain Things", was published by the Caneyville Christian Community, but eventually ceased publication.

== See also ==
- Believers in Christ, Lobelville
- Hutterite Christian Communities
- Michigan Amish Churches
- Noah Hoover Mennonites
- Orthodox Mennonites

== Literature ==
- Jeff Smith: Becoming Amish: A Family's Search for Faith, Community and Purpose, Cedar, MI, 2016, pages 157–176.
- Bryce Geiser: The Christian Communities: A Brotherhood of Covenant and Commitment, in Old Order Notes 20, (Spring Summer 2000), pages 7–22.
- Bryce E. Geiser: What Does SIMPLE LIVING Have To Do With CHRISTIANITY? published by Caneyville Christian Community, 1142 Choncie Lee Road, Caneyville, KY 42721 [without date].
- George Calvin Waldrep: The New Order Amish And Para-Amish Groups: Spiritual Renewal Within Tradition, in The Mennonite Quarterly Review 82 (2008), pages 395–426.
- Joseph Donnermeyer and Cory Anderson: The Growth of Amish and Plain Anabaptists in Kentucky, in Journal of Amish and Plain Anabaptist Studies 2(2):215, pages 215–244, 2014.
- Ira Wagler: The Life of Elmo Stoll: The Shepherd at Dusk: His Vision & Legacy.
- Edsel Burdge Jr.: The Michigan Amish Fellowship: A Case Study for Defining an Amish Affiliation in The Journal of Plain Anabaptist Communities Vol. 3, No.1, 2022.
