= Believers in Christ, Lobelville =

Anabaptist Christian community in Lobelville, Tennessee, USA

Believers in Christ is a Plain horse-and-buggy Anabaptist Christian community at Cane Creek, Lobelville, Tennessee, that is rather intentional than traditional. They are sometimes seen as either Amish or Old Order Mennonite. G. C. Waldrep classifies them as "para-Amish". Among Anabaptists the community is often simply called "Lobelville".

== History ==
The Plain community in Lobelville has a complicated history because they did not just separate from one other Old Order group but emerged from a series of splits and mergers of different Old Order groups. In addition to that, several families and individuals joined them while others left them. They share a common history with the Noah Hoover Mennonites in the early 1950s.

In 1952, most of the members of the Reformed Amish Christian Church in Tennessee, (stemming from the Church that was founded in 1895 by David Schwartz in Indiana) joined the Titus Hoover Mennonites, a subgroup of the Stauffer Mennonites. In 1954 deacon Jonas Nolt left the Titus Hoover Mennonites with followers from different backgrounds and established a Plain, Old Order Community in Mammoth Spring, Arkansas.

In the early 1970s, the Mammoth Spring community disbanded, but in 1973, a new community was founded at Lobelville by families under the leadership of minister Paul Lavy who all came from the Old Order Church in Mammoth Spring, Arkansas. The intention was to create a heartfelt primitive Christianity like in the beginning of the Anabaptist movement. The community attracted many people from Amish, Old Order Mennonite, Old German Baptist backgrounds as well as people from non-plain churches, so-called seekers.

The group struggled to hold together until Simon Beachy, a charismatic personality of Old Order Amish background, arrived. Beachy's central theme was "true brokenness". Beachy also rejected the idea of having an Ordnung (set of rules) like almost all other Old Order communities. In 1996 Beachy left the community at Lobelville to create a new one at Vernon Community, Hestand, Kentucky, with hand-picked followers. After Simon Beachy left, his brother Lewis became bishop. In 2011 some 7 or 8 families from the Pearisburg, Virginia, Amish settlement split from their community and affiliated with Lobelville, but this congregation later disbanded in the early 2020s.

== Custom and belief ==
The community at Lobelville is a Plain dress, horse-and-buggy community, that is different from most other Old Order Mennonite and Amish communities in being rather intentional than traditional. They do not have an Ordnung (set of rules) and they are not organized as a strict church with all people in the community as members. Some of their practices are considered unorthodox and outside the Old Order fold. For example, they own a van they use for long distance travel instead of hiring drivers. They dress similar to the Noah Hoover Mennonites but men do not usually wear hats.

A born again experience is expected to become a member. The Believers in Christ consider spiritual renewal and a life in the Holy Spirit to be very important. They are more open to seekers than traditional Old Order groups. They are in some way similar to communities like the Caneyville Christian Community, the Noah Hoover Mennonites, the Michigan Amish Churches and the disbanded "Christian Communities" of Elmo Stoll.

== Demographics and settlements ==
In the 1990s, before Beachy and his followers left, there were almost 100 families in the community; in 2005, there were 57 families. Besides Lobelville, there are communities affiliated with Lobelville in Maysville, Kentucky, eastern Tennessee, and near Danville, Ohio. The community near Lobelville actually is located between Lobelville, Pleasantville and Centerville.

== Literature ==
- George Calvin Waldrep: The New Order Amish And Para-Amish Groups: Spiritual Renewal Within Tradition, in The Mennonite Quarterly Review 82 (2008), pages 395-426.
- Joseph Donnermeyer and Cory Anderson: The Growth of Amish and Plain Anabaptists in Kentuck, in Journal of Amish and Plain Anabaptist Studies 2(2):215, pages 215-244, 2014.
- Ira Wagler: The Life of Elmo Stoll: The Shepherd at Dusk: His Vision & Legacy.
