= Detention River Christian Community =

Former Hutterite community in Tasmania

Detention River Community
- Hutterite Colony
- Location within Tasmania
- Coordinates: 40.880556°S 145.450556°E
- Country: Australia
- State: Tasmania
- Branch: Independent Hutterite
- Status: Disbanded
- Founded: 2005
- Mother Colony: Elmendorf Community, MN

Detention River Christian Community, formerly known as Rocky Cape Christian Community was an Anabaptist Christian community, located between Smithton and Wynyard on the Australian island of Tasmania. The community was founded in 2005 by Elmendorf Christian Community in Minnesota, a community of Hutterite tradition. Detention River was affiliated with the Hutterite Christian Communities.

In 2017 the community was reincorporated as Detention River Christian Community. In 2021 the membership voted on and passed a resolution to relocate to Paraguay. Their Tasmanian community property was sold in 2022.
