= New Order Amish =

Subgroup of Amish established in the 1960s

The New Order Amish are a subgroup of Amish that split away from the Old Order Amish in the 1960s for a variety of reasons, which included a desire for "clean" youth courting standards, meaning they do not condone the practice of bundling (non-sexual lying in bed together) during courtship. Tobacco and alcohol are also not allowed. They also wished to incorporate more evangelical elements into the church, including Sunday school and mission work. Some scholars see the group best characterized as a subgroup of the Old Order Amish, despite the name.

== History ==
The New Order Amish emerged mainly in two regions: Lancaster County, Pennsylvania, and Holmes/Wayne County, Ohio. Historian G.C. Waldrep cites a New Order Amish man to explain their distinctions:

In Lancaster County, the New Orders wanted a lot more new stuff, but they also wanted to be a little bit more spiritual. In Holmes County the New Orders wanted to be a lot more spiritual, but they also wanted a little more stuff.

Even though in Waldrep's opinion this seems "like a simplistic reading", he states that "in the final analysis the characterization appears accurate".

In 1966, around one hundred families split with the Old Order Amish in Lancaster County, Pennsylvania, over differences related to the use of modern machinery. The collective Lancaster Amish ministry forbade the use of said machinery, but in many districts, the Amish had adapted to the technology. Because of this, the ministry had a difficult time enforcing this ruling. In 1964, the bishops banned four districts from communion for not implementing the larger group’s standards on technology. By February 6, 1966, thirty Amish families, under threat of excommunication, met at the home of Christian F. Flick. There, they organized a separate service where they received communion from a liberal Amish church in Newton, Ontario. In April 1966, sixty-five families had come to associate with Flick’s group. There were three defector districts in Lancaster County by the fall of 1967. About one hundred families were split into three districts, one at Honey Brook and two at Gap.

A separate movement developed in Ohio at around the same time. In the early 1960s, a conflict in the Troyer Valley district began the movement of the New Order Amish in Ohio. At the time, only ministers and older Amish members were allowed to greet each other with a kiss. This upset the younger church members, as they wished to practice the “holy kiss” also. A ministerial committee was unable to reach a resolution. In 1966, the Troyer Valley’s bishop requested that minister Levi R. Troyer stop using the kiss to greet the younger brethren. He refused and was sent back from communion. Much like the Lancaster group, the Troyers then went outside of their church and home to find a more suitable church. From 1969–1971, about a dozen Holmes County districts joined the Troyers, headed by Bishop Roy L. Schlabach, for similar reasons.

Holmes County New Orders stood for "a strong desire to keep the Amish way; to remain Amish, but to promote more spiritual awareness and eliminate questionable practices, such as bundling, tobacco, etc."

== Way of life ==
Like Old Order groups, New Order Amish used horse and buggy, wear plain clothing, speak Pennsylvania German and practice home worship. As with other Amish, technological restrictions include prohibitions on the internet, television, and radio.

All New Order Amish districts still preserve the traditional Amish dress, although there is a trend towards slimmer brimmed hats and trimmed beards among the men. As for the New Order women, they typically have brighter colors all around. Pennsylvania German is mostly preserved, but there is a tendency to shift to the English language.

New Order Amish may be more lenient in the practice of shunning and may be more permissive of photography than lower-order groups. They were also known for introducing brighter colored fabrics. New Order Amish prohibit alcohol and tobacco use (seen in some Old Order groups), an important factor in the original division.

Different from the Old Order, the New Order actively suppress the use of tobacco and alcohol and do not allow bed courtship (bundling), which was an important factor in the original division. They did eventually allow milkers, balers, propane gas and pneumatic tires. The Lancaster County New Order Amish was different, however, they eventually did permit electricity, what led to the split into two New Order Amish groups, electric and non-electric. The Holmes County New Orders allowed men to trim their beards as well as the hair above their ears. Some New Order Amish permit telephone lines in the home.

The New Order worship patterns are essentially the same as among the Old Order.

The New Order Tobe share an unusual mix of progressive and conservative traits. They are progressive in technology but conservative in spirituality and dress. In contrast to other New Order Amish groups, they have a relatively high retention rate of their young people that is comparable to the retention rate of the Old Order Amish.

== Affiliations ==
There are four different affiliations which are referred to as being "New Order":

- Non-electric New Order (35 church districts in 2011), the most conservative among the New Orders
- Electric New Order (17 church districts in 2011), more progressive than the Non-electric New Orders
- New Order Tobe (5 church districts in 2011), progressive in technology but conservative in spirituality
- New Order Fellowship (4 church districts in 2011), the most progressive among the New Orders

Especially in Lancaster County, there is a strong trend among the New Orders to join more progressive churches. In 1994 there were two New Order districts in Lancaster County with about 60 households, by 2004 there was only a single district with 21 households and almost no young people.

== Members and congregations ==
Counting all New Order Amish groups there were 3,961 baptized members in 70 congregations with a total population of about 8,912 people in the year 2000.

In 2008/9 there were about 3,500 baptized members in 58 New Order Amish congregations, while at the same time the New Order Amish Fellowship had 400 baptized members in 7 congregations.

In 2011 there were 35 non-electric New Order districts and 17 electric ones, whereas Tobe New Order had 5 and the New Order Fellowship 4 church districts. Statistics show that New Order Amish tend to keep a lower percentage of their children in the faith, according to the group about 50 to 65 percent, while Old Orders keep 80 to 95 percent. An exception is the New Order Tobe Amish with a defection rate of only 19.6 percent.

New Order Amish communities can be found in around a dozen states including Ohio, Pennsylvania, and Indiana, Wisconsin, Michigan, Missouri, New York, Kentucky, Iowa, Illinois, Minnesota, and some others. Their largest population is in the Holmes County, Ohio, settlement.

== Similar groups ==
There are groups of Amish, considered being "Old Order", that allow more technologies than some groups of New Order Amish. According to G.C. Waldrep the Michigan-related Amish churches show many spiritual and material similarities to the New Orders, while they are still technically considered a part of the larger Old Order group. The Groffdale Conference Mennonite Church, the largest Old Order Mennonite group, allows about the same level of technology as New Order Amish groups, while there are very technologically conservative Old Order Mennonite groups, like the Noah Hoover Mennonites, that are as restrictive concerning technologies as the Swartzentruber Amish.

Affiliation	Tractor for fieldwork	Roto- tiller	Power lawn mower	Propane gas	Bulk milk tank	Mechanical milker	Mechanical refrigerator	Pickup balers	Inside flush toilet	Running water bath tub	Tractor for belt power	Pneumatic tools	Chain saw	Pressurized lamps	Motorized washing machines
Percentage of use by all Amish	6	20	25	30	35	35	40	50	70	70	70	70	75	90	97
Swartzentruber	No	No	No	No	No	No	No	No	No	No	No	Some	No	No	Yes
Andy Weaver/Dan	No	No	No	No*	No	No	No	No	Yes	Yes	Yes	Yes	Yes	Yes	Yes
Lancaster	No	No	Some	Yes	No	Yes	Yes	Yes	Yes	Yes	Yes	Yes	Yes	Yes	Yes
Nappanee, Indiana	Yes	Yes	Yes	Yes	Yes	Yes	Yes	Yes	Yes	Yes	Yes	Yes	Yes	Yes	Yes
New Order Non-electric	No	Yes	Yes	Yes	Yes	Yes	Yes	Yes	Yes	Yes	Yes	Yes	Yes	Yes	Yes
Kalona, Iowa	Yes	Yes	Yes	Yes	Yes	Yes	Yes	Yes	Yes	Yes	Yes	Yes	Yes	Yes	Yes

* Natural gas allowed

== Literature ==
- Charles Hurst and David McConnell: An Amish Paradox. Diversity and Change in the World's Largest Amish Community, Johns Hopkins University Press, Baltimore MD 2010 ISBN 9780801893988
- G.C. Waldrep: The New Order Amish and Para-Amish Groups: Spiritual Renewal within Tradition, in The Mennonite Quarterly Review 3 (2008), pages 396-426.
- Donald B. Kraybill: The Riddle of Amish Culture, Baltimore MD 2002. ISBN 9780801867712
