= Michigan Amish Churches =

Religious organization

The Michigan Amish Fellowship is a subgroup or affiliation of Old Order Amish. In 2022, this network of churches consisted of 33 settlements in Michigan, Maine, Missouri, Kentucky, Montana, and Wyoming. Stephen E. Scott described the affiliation which emerged in 1970 in Michigan as "Amish Reformist".

This affiliation, which is an atypical Amish community, is more evangelical and more open to outsiders, so-called "seekers", than other Old Order Amish affiliations.

== History ==
The church in Mio, Michigan, was founded in 1970 by Amish people from Geauga County, Ohio, and from northern Indiana. Other local churches that now are affiliated with the Michigan Amish Churches originally were not Amish but were founded by evangelistic-minded people from several Old Order Anabaptist backgrounds, who were more open to outsiders than typical Old Order Amish. Later, these congregations joined the Michigan Amish Churches.

The church in Manton, Michigan, originally not Amish, was started by people who came from LeRoy Township, Michigan, a horse-and-buggy but eagerly evangelistic church that was founded in 1981 by Harry Wanner (1935–2012), an "awakened minister" of Stauffer Mennonite background. In 1994, the church in LeRoy disbanded, and the Manton church eventually joined the Old Order Amish. The church in Smyrna, Maine, originally affiliated with the Christian Communities of Elmo Stoll (also rather evangelistic and open to seekers), later affiliated with Manton after the Christian Communities disbanded following Stoll's early death.

== Custom and belief ==
It is stated that self-professed assurance of salvation and having been "born again" is more prevalent among the Michigan Amish Churches than other Old Order Amish sects. In accordance with that, G.C. Waldrep writes that the Michigan Churches show many spiritual and material similarities to the New Order Amish while still technically considered a part of the larger Old Order group.

== Settlements and congregations ==
In 2011, the subgroup constituted 15 settlements in 3 states, with 20 congregations (or church districts) between them. In Michigan, the subgroup has settlements in Mio, Evart, Fremont, Manton and Newaygo. In Maine, there were three settlements: Smyrna, Unity, and Patten. The Amish near Pearisburg, Virginia, are affiliated with the Michigan Churches while another group of Plain people there belonged to the Believers in Christ, Lobelville, a para-Amish group, until they moved out in 2023.

== Literature ==
- Donald B. Kraybill, Karen M. Johnson-Weiner and Steven M. Nolt: The Amish, Johns Hopkins University Press, Baltimore MD 2013. ISBN 9781421425665
- Charles Hurst and David McConnell: An Amish Paradox. Diversity and Change in the World's Largest Amish Community, Johns Hopkins University Press, Baltimore MD 2010 ISBN 9780801893988
- Edsel Burdge Jr.: The Michigan Amish Fellowship: A Case Study for Defining an Amish Affiliation in The Journal of Plain Anabaptist Communities Vol. 3, No.1, 20221.
