= Plain people =

Simple lifestyle Christians

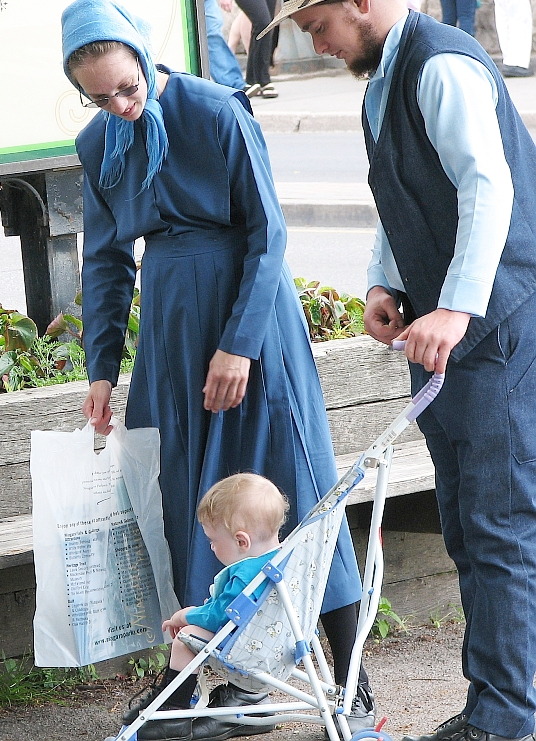
- An Amish family

Regions with significant populations
- United States

Religions
- Anabaptism, Quakers (Conservative Friends)

Plain people are Christian groups in the United States, characterized by separation from the world and by simple living, including plain dressing in modest clothing (including head covering for women). Many plain people have an Anabaptist background. These denominations are largely of German, Swiss German and Dutch ancestry, though people of diverse backgrounds have been incorporated into them. Conservative Friends are traditional Quakers who are also considered plain people; they come from a variety of ethnic backgrounds.

== Origins ==
=== Anabaptists ===
The Swiss flag

The Mennonite movement was a reform movement of Anabaptist origins begun by Swiss Brethren and soon thereafter finding greater cohesion based on the teachings of Menno Simons, and the 1632 Dordrecht Confession of Faith. The Amish movement was a reform movement within the Mennonite movement, based on the teachings of Jacob Ammann, who perceived a lack of discipline within the Mennonite movement by those trying to avoid persecution. Ammann argued that Romans 12:2 prohibited conformation with the world.

=== Quakers ===
William Penn, having experienced religious persecution as a Quaker, offered asylum to others who were suffering religious persecution, an offer that many followers of Ammann accepted, starting with the Detweiler and Sieber families, who settled in Berks County, Pennsylvania, in 1736. Many of them settled near Lancaster, Pennsylvania, which offered some of the most productive non-irrigated farmland in the world. By 1770, the Amish migration had largely ceased.

== Plain dress ==
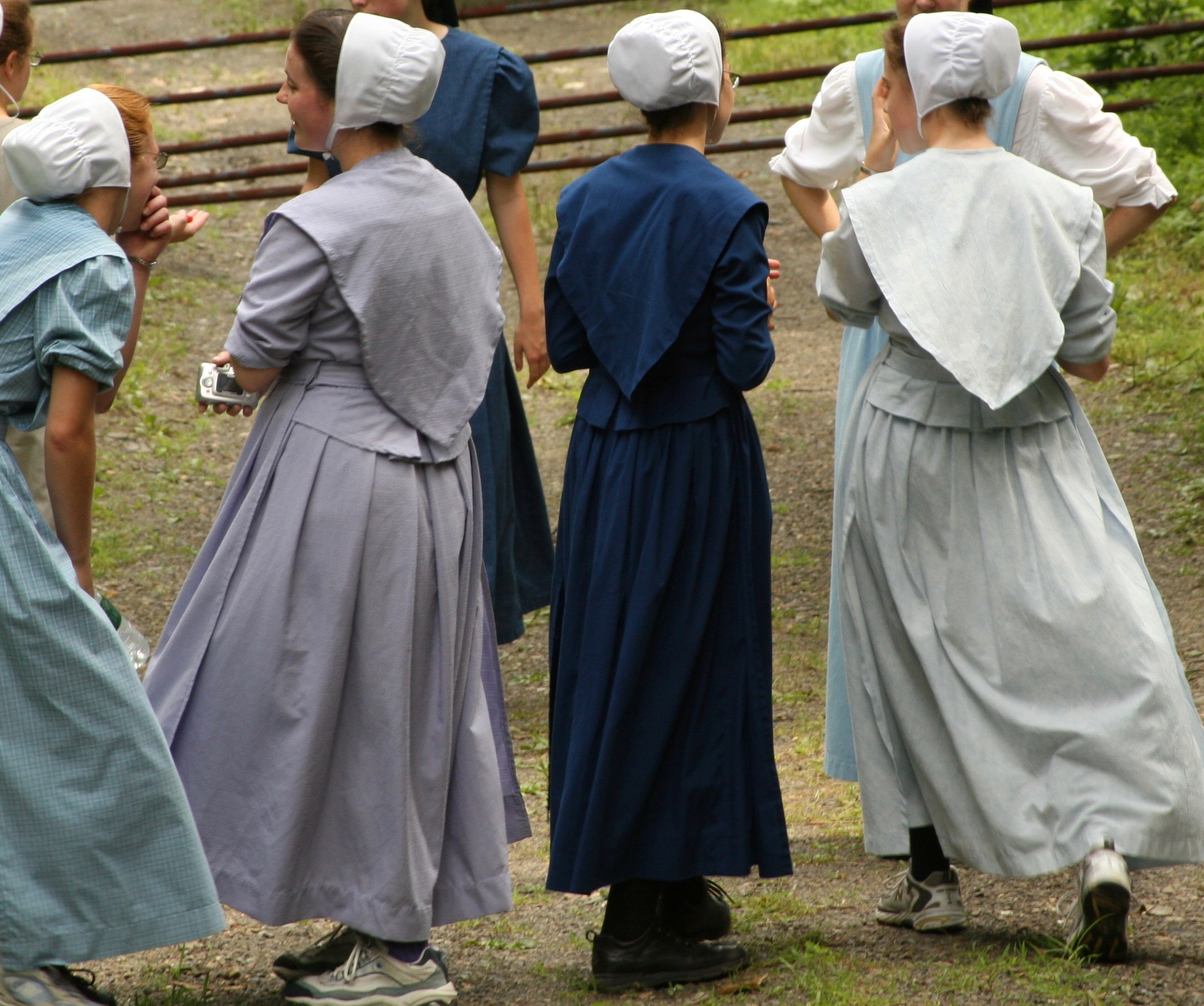
Women of the Old Order River Brethren, an Anabaptist Christian denomination, wearing the cape dress and kapp

Notable plain groups in the Anabaptist tradition are the Amish (Old Order Amish, New Order Amish, Kauffman Amish Mennonites and Beachy Amish Mennonites), Para-Amish (Believers in Christ, Vernon Community and Caneyville Christian Community), many Mennonites (Old Order Mennonites, Conservative Mennonites, Reformed Mennonites, Orthodox Mennonites, Old Colony Mennonites and Holdeman Mennonites), Hutterites, Bruderhof, certain Schwarzenau Brethren (Old German Baptist Brethren, Old Brethren, and Dunkard Brethren), certain River Brethren (Old Order River Brethren and Calvary Holiness Church) and Charity Christians.

A small number of Quakers (chiefly Conservative Friends and Holiness Friends) still practice plain dress as a part of their testimony of simplicity. The Shakers, a small religious community, dress plainly. Many Apostolic Lutherans also wear plain dress. Historically, members of the Moravian Church wore plain dress.

Early Methodists wore plain dress, with clergy condemning "high headdresses, ruffles, laces, gold, and 'costly apparel' in general". In his sermon On Dress, John Wesley, the founder of the Methodist movement, expressed his desire for Methodists to wear plain clothing in the manner practiced by Quakers: "Let me see, before I die, a Methodist congregation, full as plain dressed as a Quaker congregation." Peter Cartwright, a Methodist revivalist, noted the gradual decline of wearing plain dress among Methodists; today, members of denominations in the conservative holiness movement, such as the Allegheny Wesleyan Methodist Connection and Evangelical Wesleyan Church, continue to dress plainly, sometimes including abstention of wearing of jewelry, such as wedding rings. The Fellowship of Independent Methodist Churches, which continues to observe the ordinance of women's headcovering, stipulates "renouncing all vain pomp and glory" and "adorning oneself with modest attire."

Traditional Adventists and Mormon fundamentalists also wear plain dress.

== Plain customs ==
Customs of plain people include:

- Plain clothes, usually in solid, normally dark colors.
- Plain church buildings, or no church buildings whatsoever.
- A utilitarian view of technology, similar to the precautionary principle of technology in that unknowns should be avoided, but the emphasis was on the results in the eyes of God. If they were unsure of how God would look upon a technology, the leaders of the church would determine whether it was to be avoided. The degree to which this principle was supported varied among the congregations, but in general, the Amish people believed that the Mennonites had not done enough to separate themselves from the rest of the world.

== Religious practices ==
Anabaptist plain groups typically have a bishop presiding over one congregation (Amish) or over a district (group of congregations) (Old Order Mennonites). Mennonites mostly meet in church buildings, but most Amish meet in members' homes. Services among Amish and Plain Mennonites are mostly held in Pennsylvania German, a language closely related to Palatinate German, with extra vocabulary. Bishops are commonly chosen by lot as a reflection of God's will. While the bishop tends to be influential, he tends to rule by building consensus rather than by issuing edicts.

Most Anabaptist plain groups have an ordnung that among other things regulates clothing. The ordnung is a largely unwritten code of behavior, covering such items as clothing, vehicles, and the use of technology. The ordnung varies slightly from congregation to congregation though is in essence the same. Violations are not considered sins, although pride, selfishness and wilfulness are considered to be serious violations of the faith. The congregation can change the ordnung if there is a majority who desire to do so. Exemptions to the ordnung can be provided. In one instance, one farmer was granted permission to buy a modern tractor since he had arthritis and no children to help him harness horses. In other very hot, dry areas such as the Southwestern United States, where horses may not be able to work hard in the field throughout the day, some provision has been made for mechanical plowing and harvesting.

== Trends ==
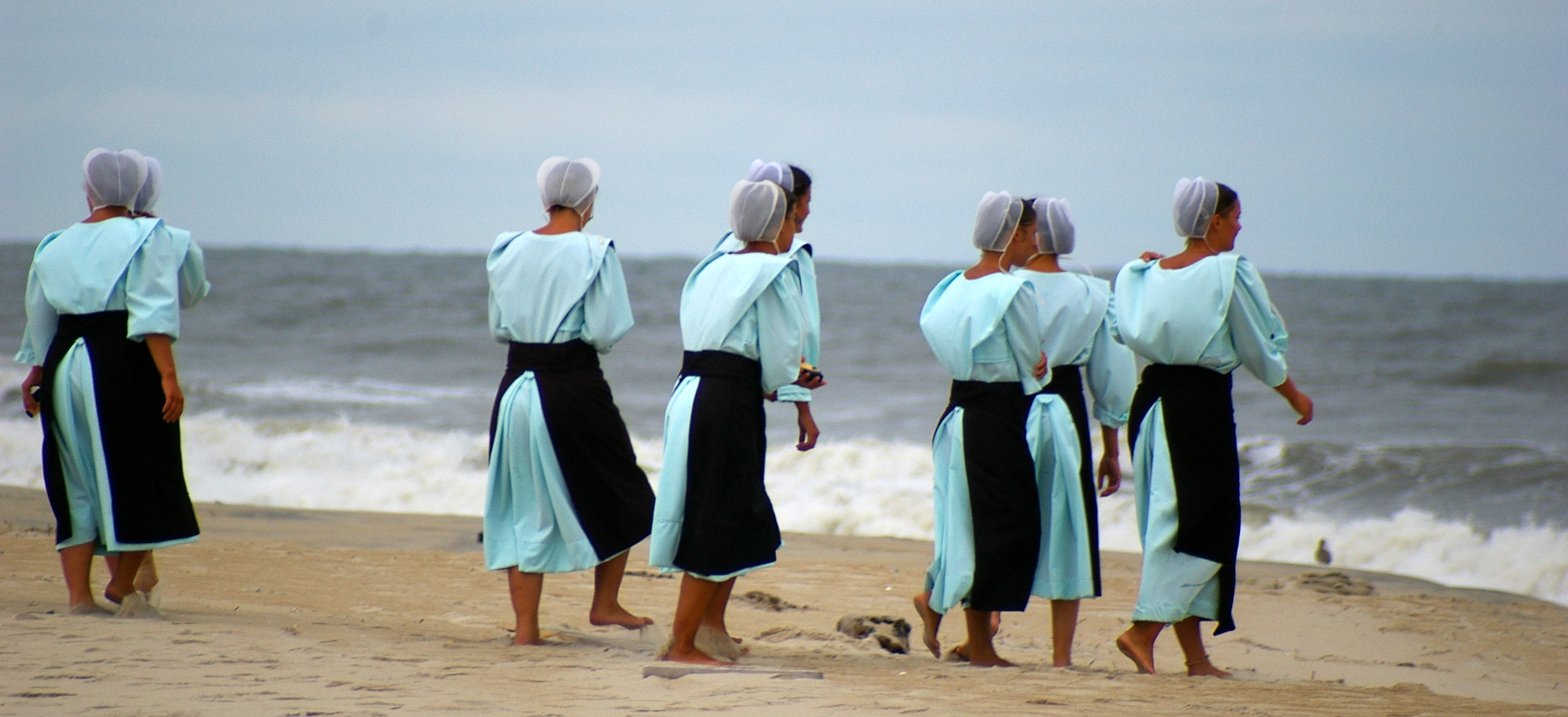
Young Amish women at the beach, Chincoteague, Virginia

The Old Order Amish are among the fastest-growing populations in the world. They have low infant mortality rates. The average Amish woman can expect to have at least seven live births. Other plain sects with the same or similar doctrines can be expected to have similarly explosive growth.

Despite this, the Pennsylvania Dutch—which includes Amish, Old Order Mennonite, and Conservative Mennonites—are expected by some to become a smaller percentage of the population as the sects respond to high prices of farmland by spreading out all over the United States and internationally, and the "English" (the Amish exonym for non-Amish persons regardless of ancestry) population spreads out from Philadelphia into suburban and rural areas. Many Amish and plain Mennonites of the last 30 years have moved into non-farm work, such as construction, woodworking, harness making, shopkeeping, auctioneer services and other crafts. Donald Kraybill believes there are Plain church communities in 47 states.

Among people at least five years old living in Lancaster County in 2000,

- 89% spoke English at home;
- 7% spoke Pennsylvania Dutch;
- 4% spoke Spanish.

Most but not all Anabaptist plain churches do not admit children to their church membership, requiring baptism first during the teen years, and so they impose no sanctions on those who do not join but shun those who fall away from the church once becoming a member. Among some groups of Old Order Amish, teenagers who are not yet baptized are not bound by the rules and go through a period of rumspringa, often with a certain amount of misbehavior that would not otherwise be tolerated.

== Health ==
The Amish generally do not proselytize and discourage intermarriage with outsiders unless they have joined the Amish. Because of their historic tendency to relocate less in their lifetime, a high birthrate, a high number of double cousins as compared with the general public, and a lower number of possible marriage partners, this has historically resulted in marriages of 3rd, 4th, 5th, and other cousins who share ancestors. Similar to European royalty, this close degree of consanguinity has led to certain genetic problems occurring more frequently among the Amish. Dr. D. Holmes Morton has established the Clinic for Special Children to study and treat families with these problems.

Many of the plain churches prohibit insurance, and instead they follow a system of mutual aid to assist each other charitably in case of sickness, accident, death, or property damage. Internal Revenue Service Form 4029 allows one to claim exemption from Social Security taxes under certain restrictive conditions, and members of the plain groups who do not pay these taxes also do not receive death, disability, or retirement benefits from Social Security.

== See also ==
- Fancy Dutch
- Haredi Judaism
- Kashketnyky
- Peace churches
- Testimony of simplicity
- Tolstoyan movement
