= Family Life (Amish magazine) =

USA magazine

- July 2010 issue
- Frequency: Monthly
- Publisher: Pathway
- Country: Canada

Family Life is a magazine published by, and primarily for, the Old Order Amish. The publisher is Pathway Publishers of Aylmer, Ontario, Canada. Unlike some Amish publications, Family Life is printed entirely in English rather than Pennsylvania Dutch or German.

The magazine was founded in 1968 and is published monthly. It contains articles, poetry, recipes, and drawings submitted by readers. It also has several regular columns on subjects such as health, nature, and religion. Like its primary readership, Family Life magazine stresses simplicity, basic Christian doctrine, and an agricultural lifestyle.

Exact circulation figures are unavailable. The magazine does have some non-Amish readership, including Mennonites. It is used as a reference by some scholars, sociologists, and anthropologists who study the Amish. In addition to Family Life, Pathway produces two companion publications: Blackboard Bulletin, concerning schooling and education, and Young Companion, focusing on youth issues.
