= Plain dress =

Clothing worn by some religious groups

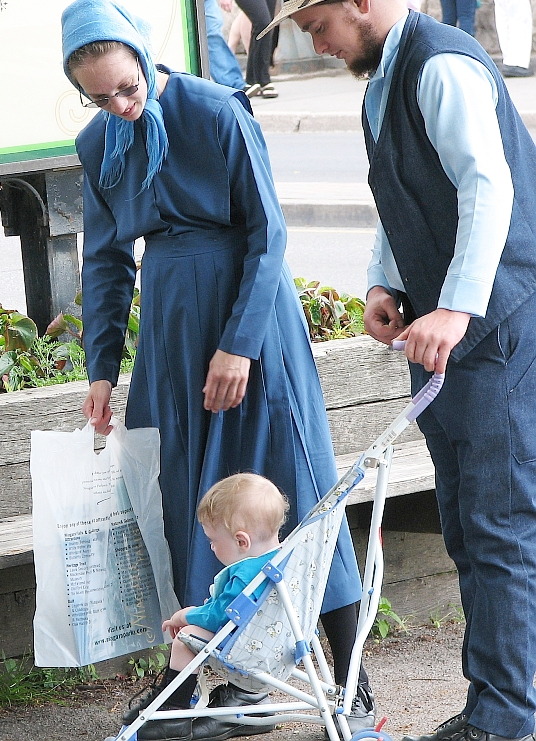
An Old Order Amish family in traditional plain dress

Plain dress is a practice among some religious groups, primarily some Christian churches in which people dress in clothes of traditional modest design, sturdy fabric, and conservative cut. It is intended to show acceptance of traditional gender roles, modesty, and readiness to work and serve, and to preserve communal identity and separation from the ever-changing fashions of the world. For men, this often takes the form of trousers secured by suspenders, while for women, plain dress usually takes the form of a cape dress along with a headcovering (normatively a kapp or an opaque hanging veil).

== History ==
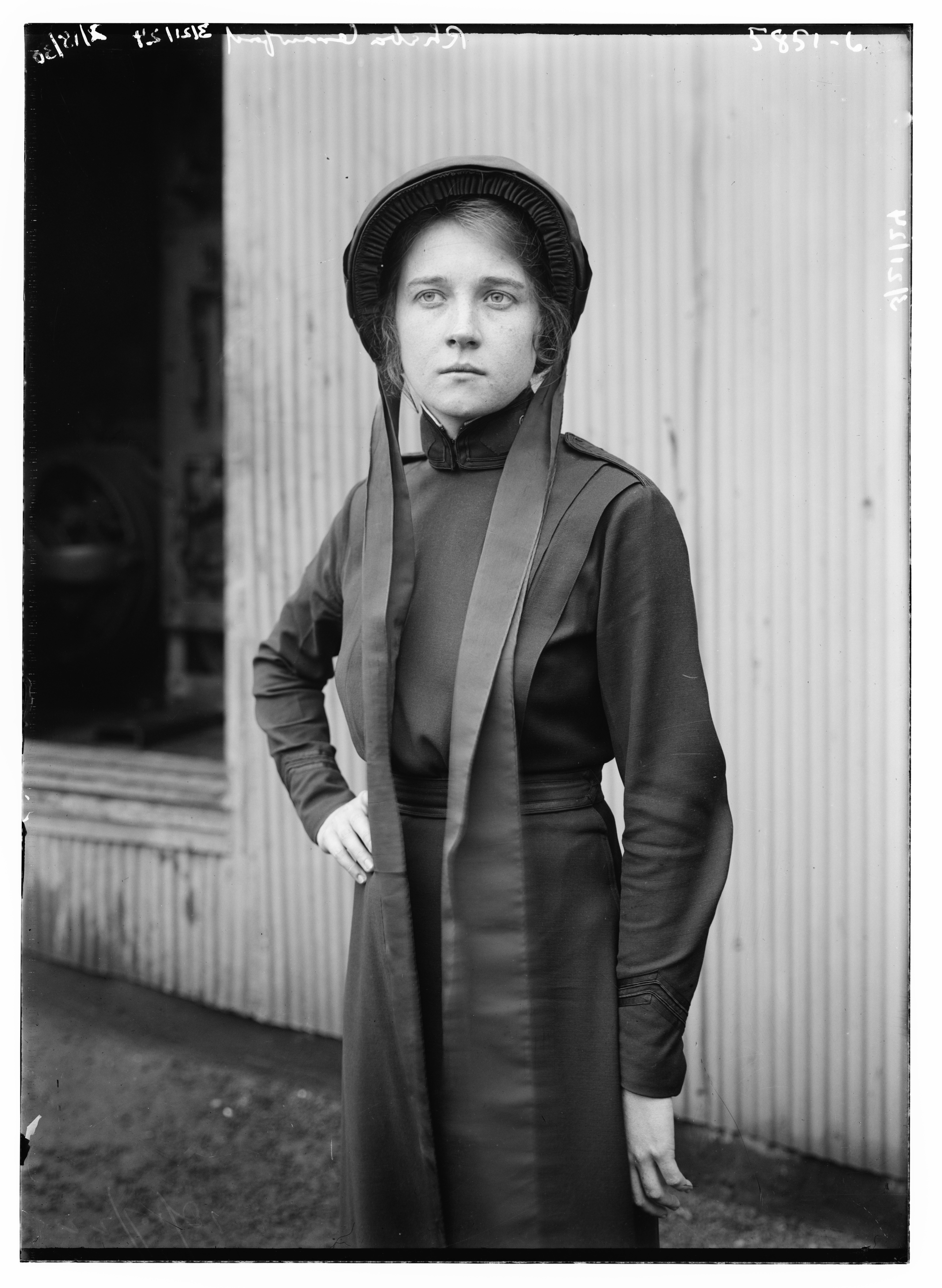
Rheba Crawford in New York City in the 1920s, wearing her Salvation Army uniform, a dark plain dress and bonnet

Christian denominations that observe the wearing of plain dress, such as the Schwarzenau Brethren Anabaptists, do so because Jesus "condemned anxious thought for raiment" in Matthew 6:25–33 and Luke 12:22–31. They teach that the wearing of plain dress is scripturally commanded in 1 Timothy 2:9–10, 1 Peter 3:3–5, and 1 Corinthians 11:5–6, in addition to being taught by the early Church Fathers:

As, then, in the fashioning of our clothes, we must keep clear of all strangeness, so in the use of them we must beware of extravagance. For neither is it seemly for the clothes to be above the knee, as they say was the case with the Lacedaemonian virgins; nor is it becoming for any part of a woman to be exposed. Though you may with great propriety use the language addressed to him who said, "Your arm is beautiful; yes, but it is not for the public gaze. Your thighs are beautiful but, was the reply, for my husband alone. And your face is comely. Yes; but only for him who has married me." But I do not wish chaste women to afford cause for such praises to those who, by praises, hunt after grounds of censure; and not only because it is prohibited to expose the ankle, but because it has been enjoined that the head should be veiled and the face covered; for it is a wicked thing for beauty to be a snare to men. —Paedagogus

In plain communities, women wear Christian headcoverings in keeping with the teaching of Saint Paul in 1 Corinthians 11:5–6, as well as that of the early Church Fathers.

== Practicing groups ==
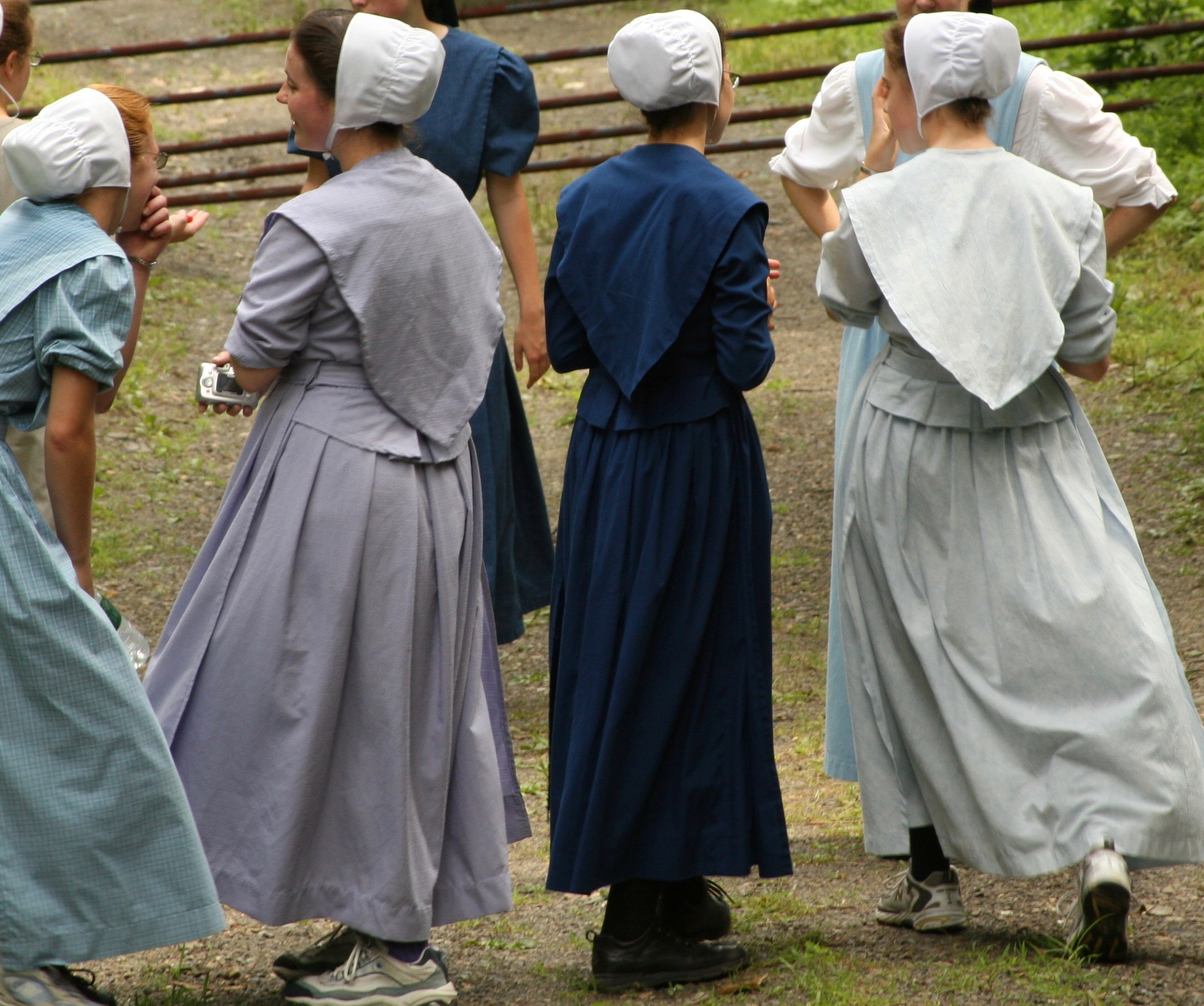
Women of the Old Order River Brethren, an Anabaptist Christian denomination, wearing the cape dress and kapp

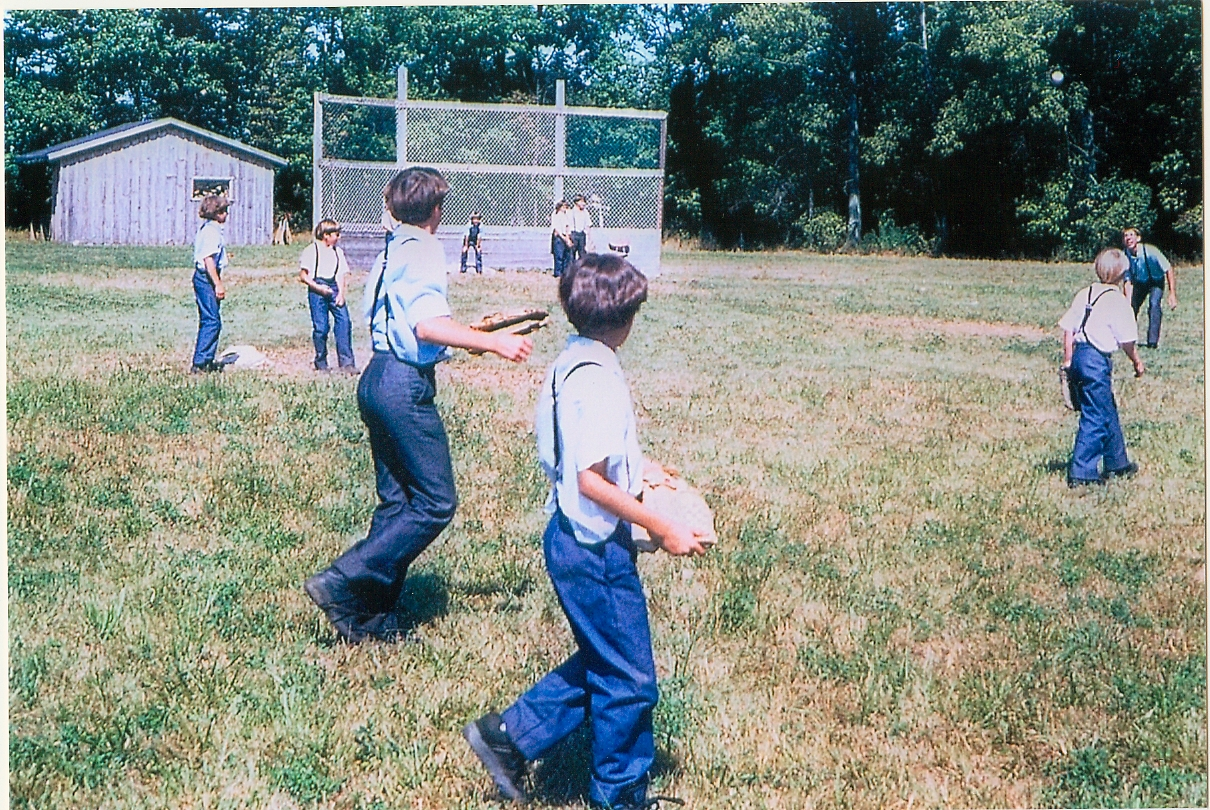
New Order Amish children playing baseball in plain clothing

The practice is generally found among the following Anabaptist branches:

- Amish (Old Order Amish, New Order Amish, Kauffman Amish Mennonites, Beachy Amish Mennonites, Old Beachy Amish),
- Para-Amish (Believers in Christ, Vernon Community, Caneyville Christian Community).
- Mennonites (Old Order Mennonites, Conservative Mennonites, traditional "Russian" Mennonites, Holdeman Mennonites).
- Hutterites, (Schmiedeleut, Dariusleut, Lehrerleut, Bruderhof, Hutterite Christian Communities).
- Schwarzenau Brethren (Old Brethren, Old German Baptist Brethren, Old German Baptist Brethren, New Conference, Old Order German Baptist Brethren, Old Brethren German Baptist, Dunkard Brethren).
- River Brethren (Old Order River Brethren, Calvary Holiness Church).

Plain dress is also practiced by some Conservative Friends and Holiness Friends (Quakers), in which it is part of their testimony of simplicity, as well as Old Regular Baptists, Plymouth Brethren, Cooperites and fundamentalist Mormon subgroups.

Among traditional Anabaptist groups, plain dress is an expression of their beliefs regarding modesty and veiling, as well as nonconformity to the world—which they see as consistent with the Bible and teachings of the early Church Fathers. Plain, simple and serviceable gender-identifying dress is governed by an unwritten code of conduct, called "ordnung" among Anabaptists, which is strictly adhered to by Amish, Old Order Mennonites, and conservative Brethren.

Members of the Moravian Church traditionally wore plain dress.

Historically, Methodists were known for wearing plain dress, a tradition carried on by those in the conservative holiness movement, such as communicants of the Allegheny Wesleyan Methodist Connection and Evangelical Wesleyan Church, as well as some Holiness Pentecostal denominations in the Wesleyan-Arminian tradition. The Church of God (Restoration) also observes plain dress.

Adventists wear plain dress as taught by the founder of that faith Ellen White, who asked that they "adopt a simple, unadorned dress of modest length". The Church Manual of the Seventh-day Adventist Church teaches "To dress plainly, and abstain from display of jewelry and ornaments of every kind is in keeping with our faith." Adherents of the Seventh-day Adventist Church have historically not worn wedding rings.

Other groups adhering to a conservative dress code include Buddhist and Christian monks, Orthodox Jews, and more conservative Muslims such as Salafis, but these forms of dress normally are not called "plain dress".

== Practices ==
Plain dress is attributed to reasons of theology and sociology. In general, plain dress involves the covering of much of the body (often including the head, forearms and calves), with minimal ornamentation, rejecting jewelry and sometimes print fabrics, trims, and fasteners. Non-essential elements of garments such as neckties, collars, and lapels may be minimized or omitted. Practical garments such as aprons and shawls may be layered over the basic ensemble. Plain dress garments are often handmade and may be produced by groups of women in the community for efficiency and to ensure uniformity of style. Plain dress practices can extend to the grooming of hair and beards and may vary somewhat to allow children and older people more latitude. In plain communities, women traditionally wear Christian headcoverings in keeping with the teaching of Saint Paul in 1 Corinthians 11:5–6.

Within these general practices, distinctions abound. Among some groups, the headcovering worn by women is lacy or translucent; in others, it must be opaque.

=== Anabaptist ===
The traditional plain dress worn by the Old Order Anabaptists and Conservative Anabaptists has long sleeves with a set waist, long skirt, and no adornment. It denotes "utility, modesty, long wear and inconspicuousness", does not display any trademark, and is not dictated by fashion trends. Shawl, aprons, bonnets and cap are part of plain dress.

Clothing worn by Bruderhof women includes a headcovering, as well as long skirts or dresses; men wear contemporary clothes of a modest nature.

=== Quaker ===
As a part of their testimony of simplicity, Quakers (Religious Society of Friends) traditionally wore plain dress; "Ruffles and lace and other forms of ornamentation, as well as unnecessary cuffs and collars and lapels and buttons, were forbidden." George Fox implored fellow Quakers to wear plain dress:

Friends, keep out of the vain fashions of the world; let not your eyes, minds, and spirits run after every fashion (in attire) of the nations; for that will lead you from the solid life into unity with that spirit that leads to follow the fashions of the nations, after every fashion of apparel that gets up: but mind that which is sober and modest, and keep to your plain fashions, that you may judge the world's vanity and spirit, in its vain fashions, and show a constant spirit in the truth and plainness.

This classical Quaker belief practice continues to be maintained by Conservative Friends, as well as the Holiness Friends. For Conservative Friends, plain dress for men usually includes "a broad-brimmed felt or straw hat, trousers with suspenders instead of a belt, and muted colors in the fabrics: blacks, whites, greys, browns", sometimes with "broad-fall trouser cuts". Quaker men traditionally are clean-shaven. Conservative Quaker women practice headcovering by wearing a "scarf, bonnet, or cap" and "wear long-sleeved, long dresses". Most Quakers these days wear simple, practical, unpretentious modern clothes.

=== Firstborn Laestadian Lutherans ===
Evangelical-Lutherans of the Firstborn Laestadian tradition practice plain dress. In the practice of Firstborn Laestadian Evangelical-Lutherans, men do not wear outward adornment, such as ties; additionally, men maintain short haircuts. Women of the Firstborn Laestadian Evangelical-Lutheran tradition wear head coverings during the offering of the Holy Mass, as well as during prayer. In the Firstborn Laestadian Evangelical-Lutheran tradition, modesty is emphasized, and adherents do not wear jewelry (cf. 1 Corinthians 11:1–13, 1 Timothy 2:9–10, 1 Peter 3:3–4).

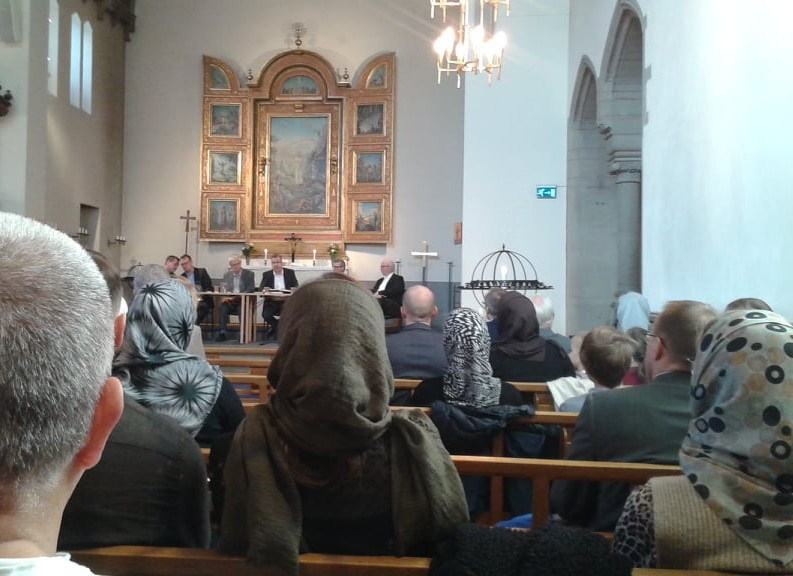
Evangelical-Lutherans of the Firstborn Laestadian tradition attend the offering of the Holy Mass at the Church of Saint Stephen in Stockholm, Sweden

=== Methodist ===
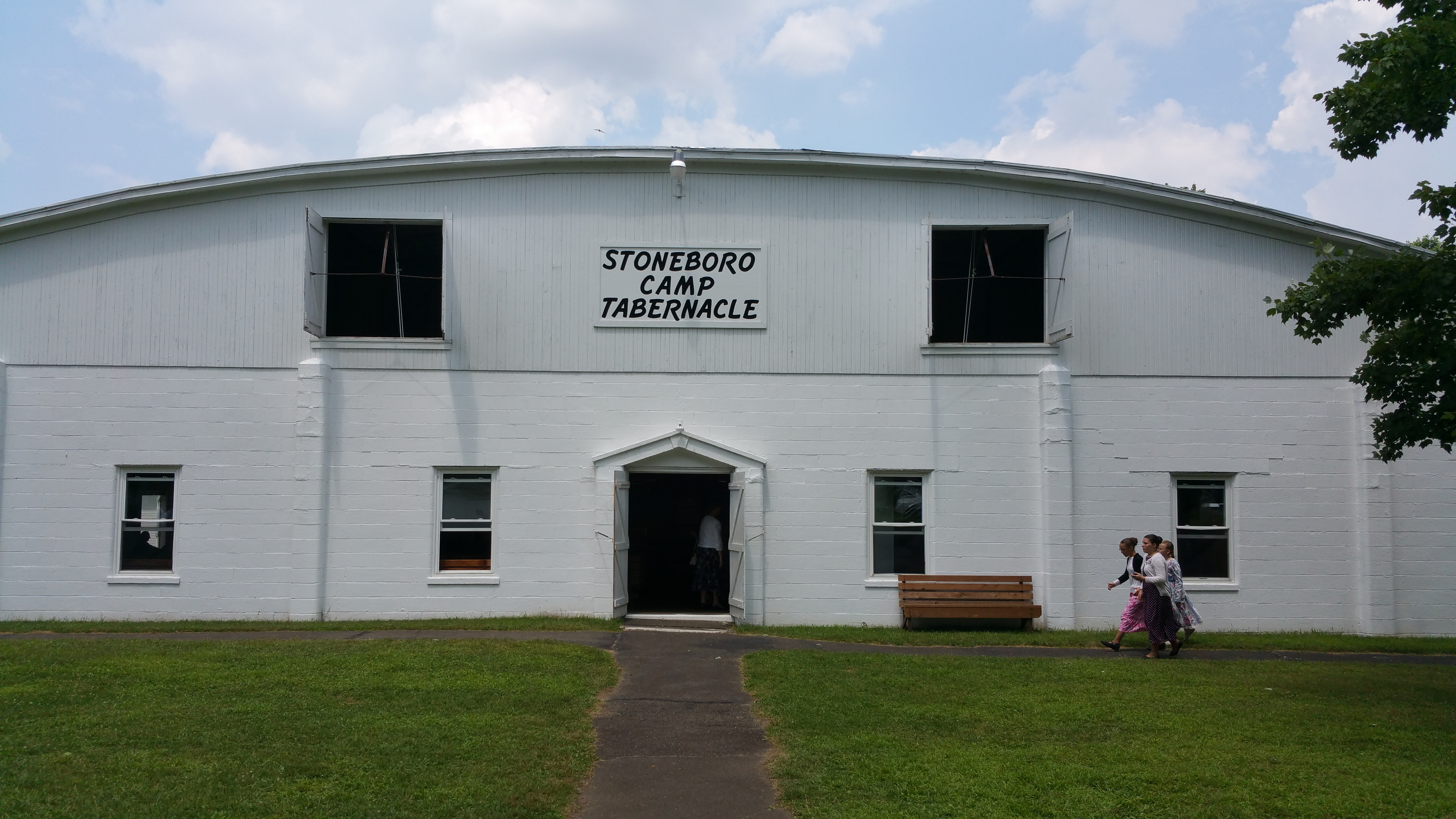
Wesleyan Methodist girls enter the tabernacle at a camp meeting.

Early Methodists wore plain dress, with Methodist clergy condemning "high headdresses, ruffles, laces, gold, and 'costly apparel' in general". John Wesley, the founder of the Methodist movement, recommended that Methodists read his thoughts On Dress, in which he detailed acceptable types and colors of fabrics, in addition to "shapes and sizes of hats, coats, sleeves, and hairstyles"; in that sermon, John Wesley expressed his desire for Methodists: "Let me see, before I die, a Methodist congregation, full as plain dressed as a Quaker congregation." He also taught, with respect to headcovering, that women, "especially in a religious assembly", should "keep on her veil". Those who tried to attend Methodist services in costly apparel were denied admittance. Wesley's teaching was based on his interpretation of 1 Timothy 2:9–10 and 1 Peter 3:3–4, which he stated led him to conclude that "expensive clothes puff up their wearers, promote vanity, incite anger, inflame lust, retard the pursuit of holiness, and steal from God and the poor." The 1858 Discipline of the Wesleyan Methodist Connection stated that "we would not only enjoin on all who fear God plain dress, but we would recommend to our preachers and people, according to Mr. Wesley's views expressed in his sermon on the inefficiency of Christianity, published but a few years before his death, and containing his matured judgment, distinguishing plainness—Plainness which will publicly comment them to the maintenance of their Christian profession wherever they may be." The 1859 novel Adam Bede portrayed the Methodist itinerant preacher, Dinah Morris, wearing plain dress, with the words "I saw she was a Methodist, or Quaker, or something of that sort, by her dress". Peter Cartwright, a Methodist revivalist, lamented the decline of wearing plain dress among Methodists, stating:

The Methodists in that early day dressed plain; attended their meetings faithfully, especially preaching, prayer and class meetings; they wore no jewelry, no ruffles; they would frequently walk three or four miles to class-meetings and home again, on Sundays; they would go thirty or forty miles to their quarterly meetings, and think it a glorious privilege to meet their presiding elder, and the rest of the preachers. They could, nearly every soul of them, sing our hymns and spiritual songs. They religiously kept the Sabbath day: many of them abstained from dram-drinking, not because the temperance reformation was ever heard of in that day, but because it was interdicted in the General Rules of our Discipline. The Methodists of that day stood up and faced their preacher when they sung; they kneedled down in the public congregation as well as elsewhere, when the preacher said, "Let us pray." There was no standing among the members in time of prayer, especially the abominable practice of sitting down during that exercise was unknown among early Methodists. Parents did not allow their children to go to balls or plays; they did not send them to dancing schools; they generally fasted once a week, and almost universally on Friday before each quarterly meeting. If the Methodists had dressed in the same "superfluity of naughtiness" then as they do now, there were very few even out of the Church that would have had any confidence in their religion. But O, how have things changed for the worse in this educational age of the world!

While few wear plain dress in mainline Methodism today, Methodist Churches of the conservative holiness movement, such as the Allegheny Wesleyan Methodist Connection and Evangelical Wesleyan Church, continue to dress plainly, also avoiding the wearing of jewelry (inclusive of wedding rings). The Fellowship of Independent Methodist Churches, which continues to observe the ordinance of women's headcovering, stipulates "renouncing all vain pomp and glory" and "adorning oneself with modest attire."

=== Moravian ===
Historically, members of the Moravian Church wore plain dress:

Their strait, unlapelled, dark brown coat, the broad-brimmed, low-crowned hat, the knee-buckled small clothes, the broad, round-toed shoe, were consistent characteristics of a Moravian brother; whilst the plain drab or black silk bonnet, the three-corned white kerchief, the plain silk gown (Sunday dress), the comfortable hood-finished cloack, the "stuff" shoe, for comfort and convenience, were the sisters' concession to St. Peter's advice, "whose adorning, let it not be that outward adorning of plaiting the hair, and wearing of gold, or putting on of apparel."

The haube is a Christian headovering that has historically been worn by women who belong to the Moravian Church, at least since the 1730s. Nicolaus Zinzendorf, a Moravian divine, "likened the Haube to a 'visible diadem' representative of Jesus' burial cloth." In 1815, Moravian women in the United States switched to wearing the English bonnet of their neighbors. Certain Moravian women continue to wear a headcovering during worship, in keeping with 1 Corinthians 11:5–6. Additionally, in the present-day, Moravian ladies wear a lace headcovering called a haube when serving as dieners in the celebration of lovefeasts.

=== Holiness Pentecostal ===
Certain Holiness Pentecostal denominations enjoin dress standards for their members; the Calvary Holiness Association, a Holiness Pentecostal denomination, teaches:

We urge people to dress with simplicity and modesty, as becometh holiness. Even the ornament of a meek and quiet spirit, which is in the sight of God, of greater price (I Peter 3:3-4; I Tim. 2:9). We consider wearing shorts, bathing suits, ladies' pants, makeup and men without shirts immodest.

== Theological bases ==
Plain dressing Christians cite Paul's advice to the Romans, "Be not conformed to this world," as one Biblical basis for their distinctive dress. Other scripture passages counsel women to wear head coverings while praying (1 Corinthians 11:5), not to cut their hair (1 Corinthians 11:14–15), and for men not to shave or cut their beards (Leviticus 19:27).

The rejection of extravagant clothing is further established in 1 Timothy 2:9–10:

[T]hat women adorn themselves in modest apparel, with shamefacedness and sobriety; not with broided hair, or gold, or pearls, or costly array; but (which becometh women professing godliness) with good works.

Some Mormon Fundamentalist groups such as the FLDS wear plain dress, referring both to Biblical and unique Latter Day Saint Scriptures, such as the Book of Alma and the Doctrine and Covenants, which states, "Thou shalt not be proud in thy heart; let all thy garments be plain, and their beauty of the work of thine own hands" (42:40).

== Social effects ==
Plain dress may establish a sense of belonging within the community while also marking the group's members as different in the wider society. Some practitioners describe their dress as a protection from unwanted attention. Quaker minister Elizabeth Fry considered her plain dress to serve as "a hedge against the world", and "a sort of protector". Marketing through the internet has these sites which propagate plain dress: "Quaker Jane", "Plain and Simple Headcoverings", "Rachel's Seamstress Services" and "Mennonite Maidens".

Simple dress, considered "sensible and useful" and necessary, is sometimes hard to find as the clothing market is dictated by fashion-conscious people who consider plain dress dull.

== In literature ==
Dressing heroines in Victorian literature in plain dress is often assumed to be a way of making characters appear classless and sexless. Others argue that authors like Charlotte Brontë, George Eliot, and Anthony Trollope use plain dress to highlight the marriageability of the character, sexualizing her by emphasizing the female body within. Additionally, plain dress may signify a character's rejection of societal norms and willingness to leave the household to act on her desires.

== Gallery ==
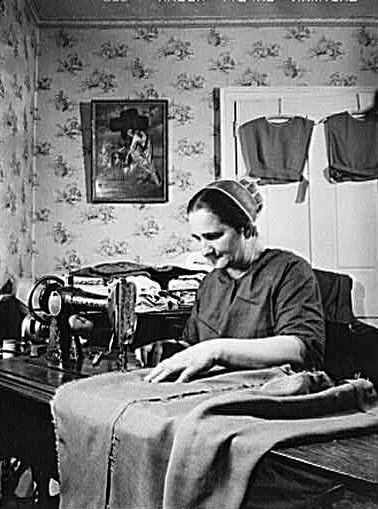
Pennsylvania Dutch Mennonite woman in 1942

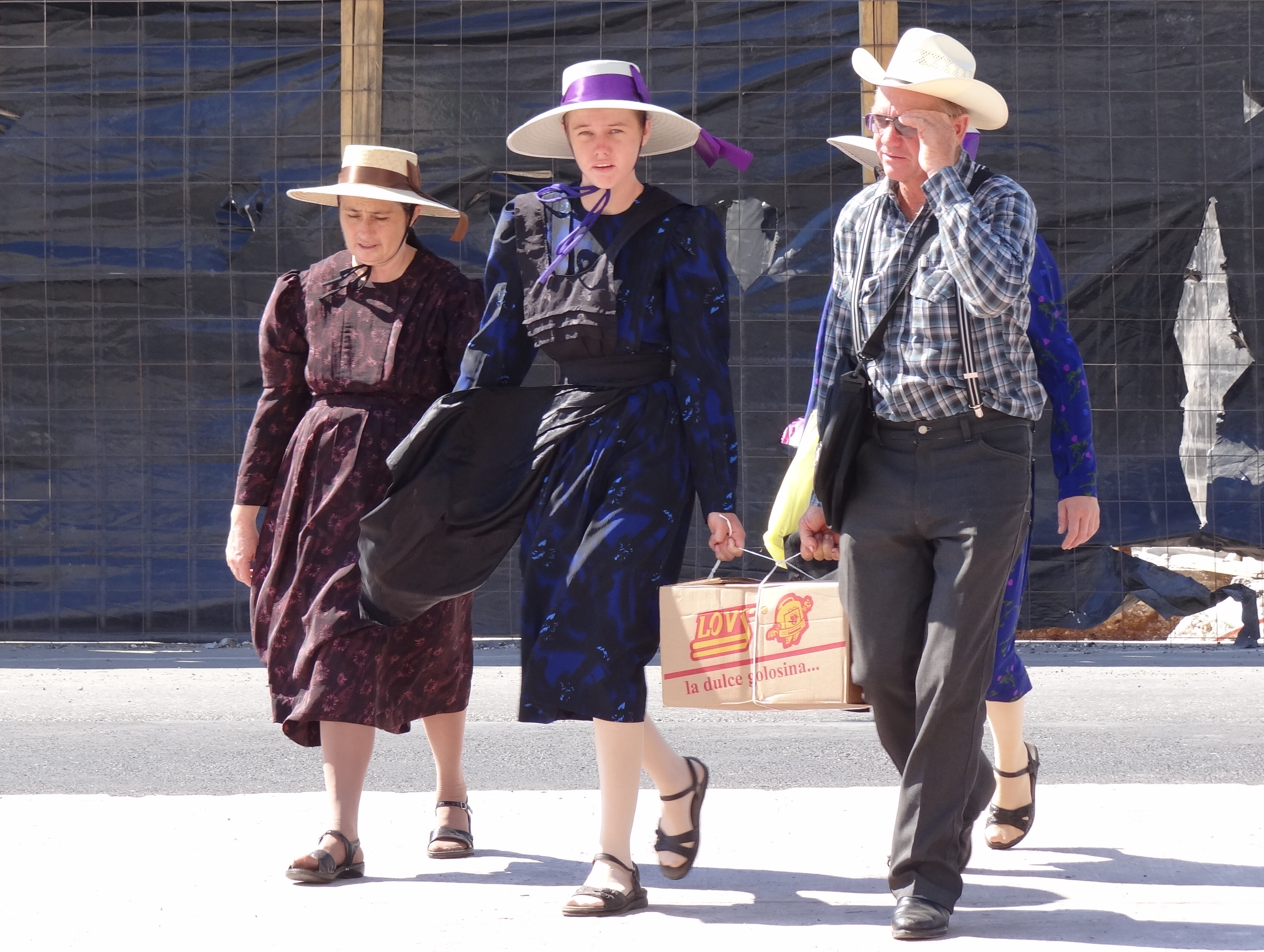
An Old Colony Mennonite family in Campeche, Mexico

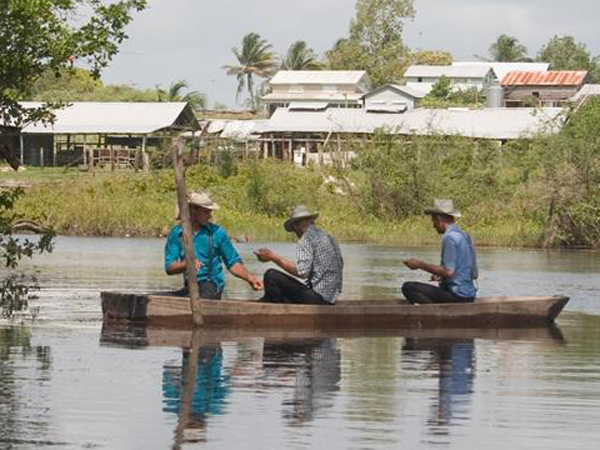
Old Colony Mennonites on New River, Belize

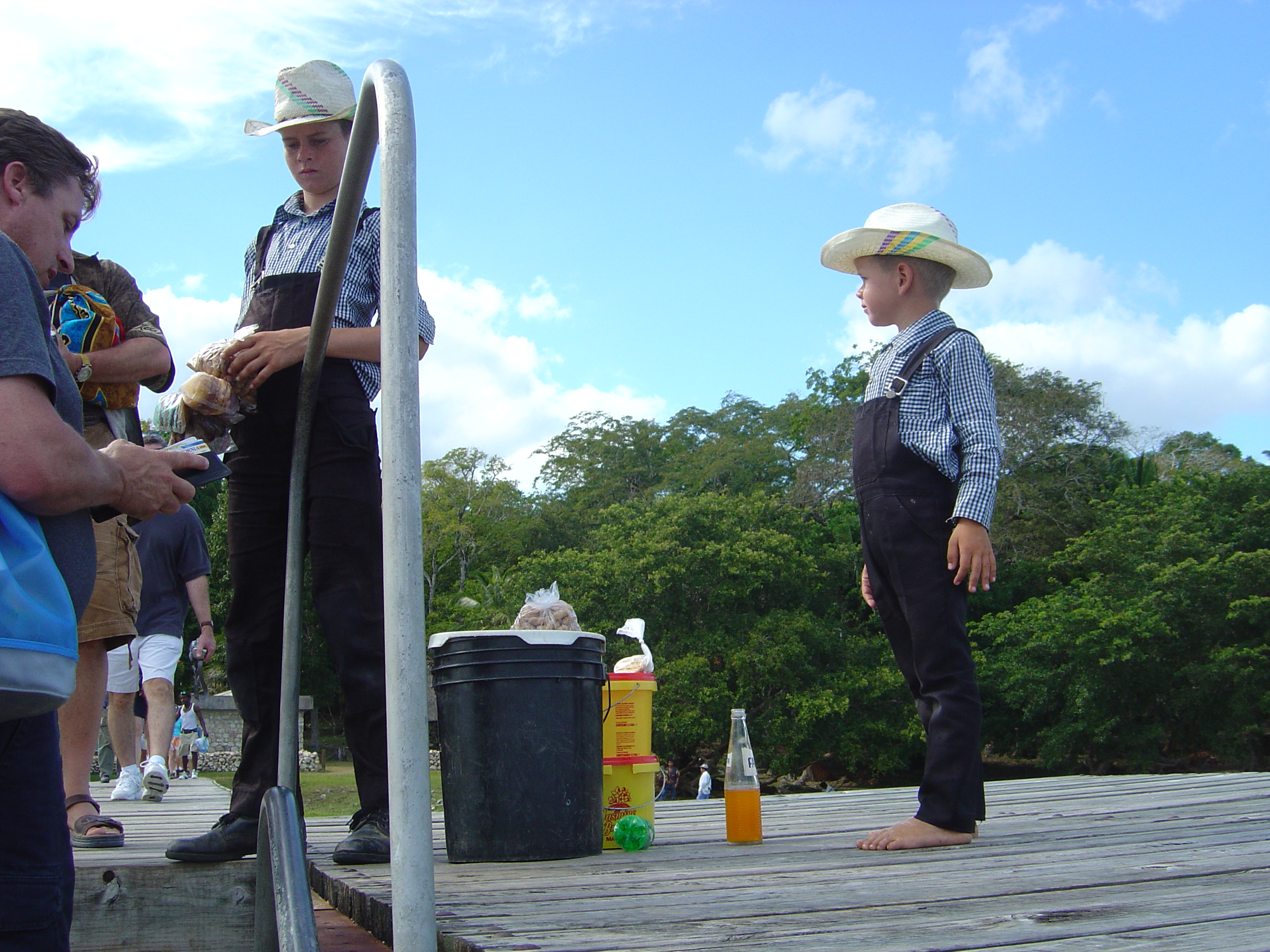
Two plain dressed Old Colony Mennonite boys near Lamanai in Belize

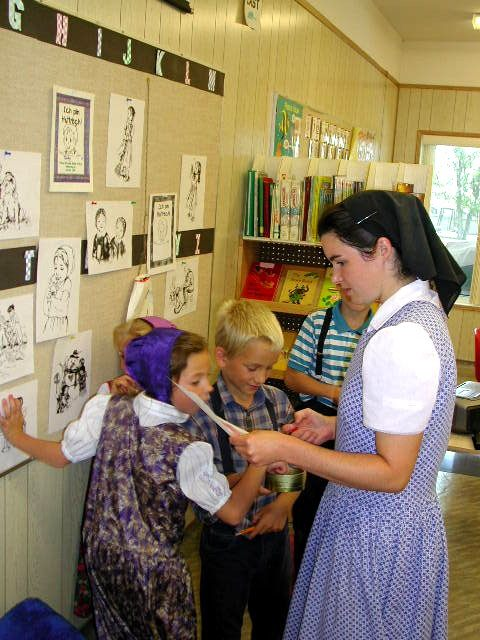
Schmiedeleut Hutterites at school

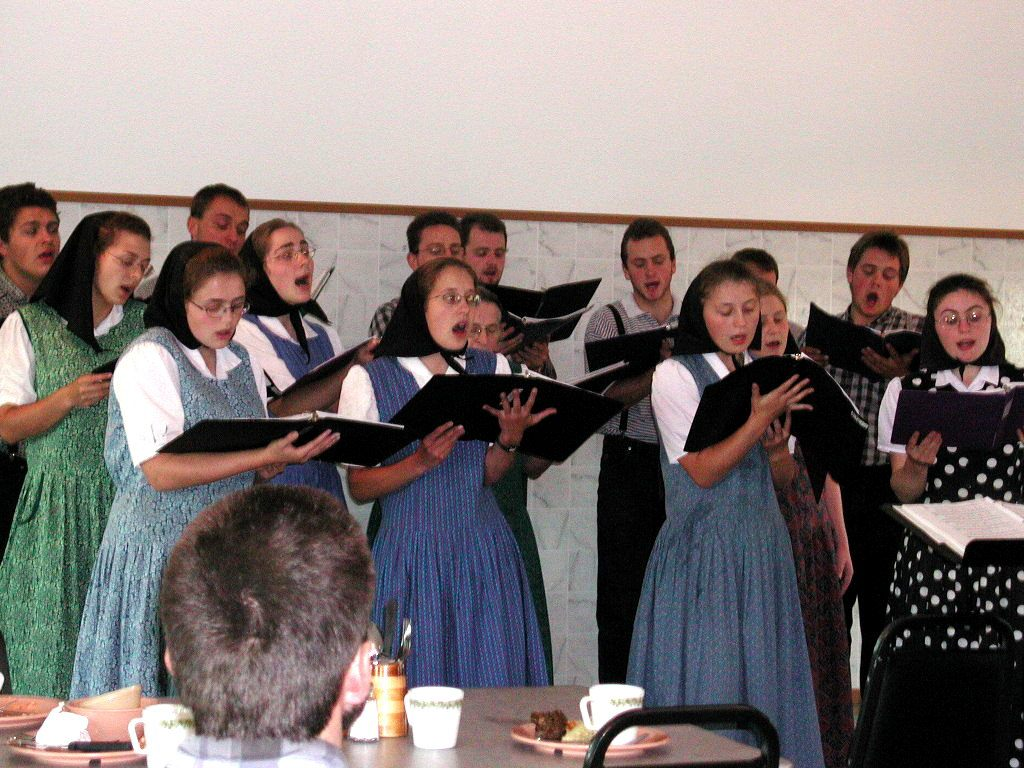
Schmiedeleut Hutterites singing a hymn

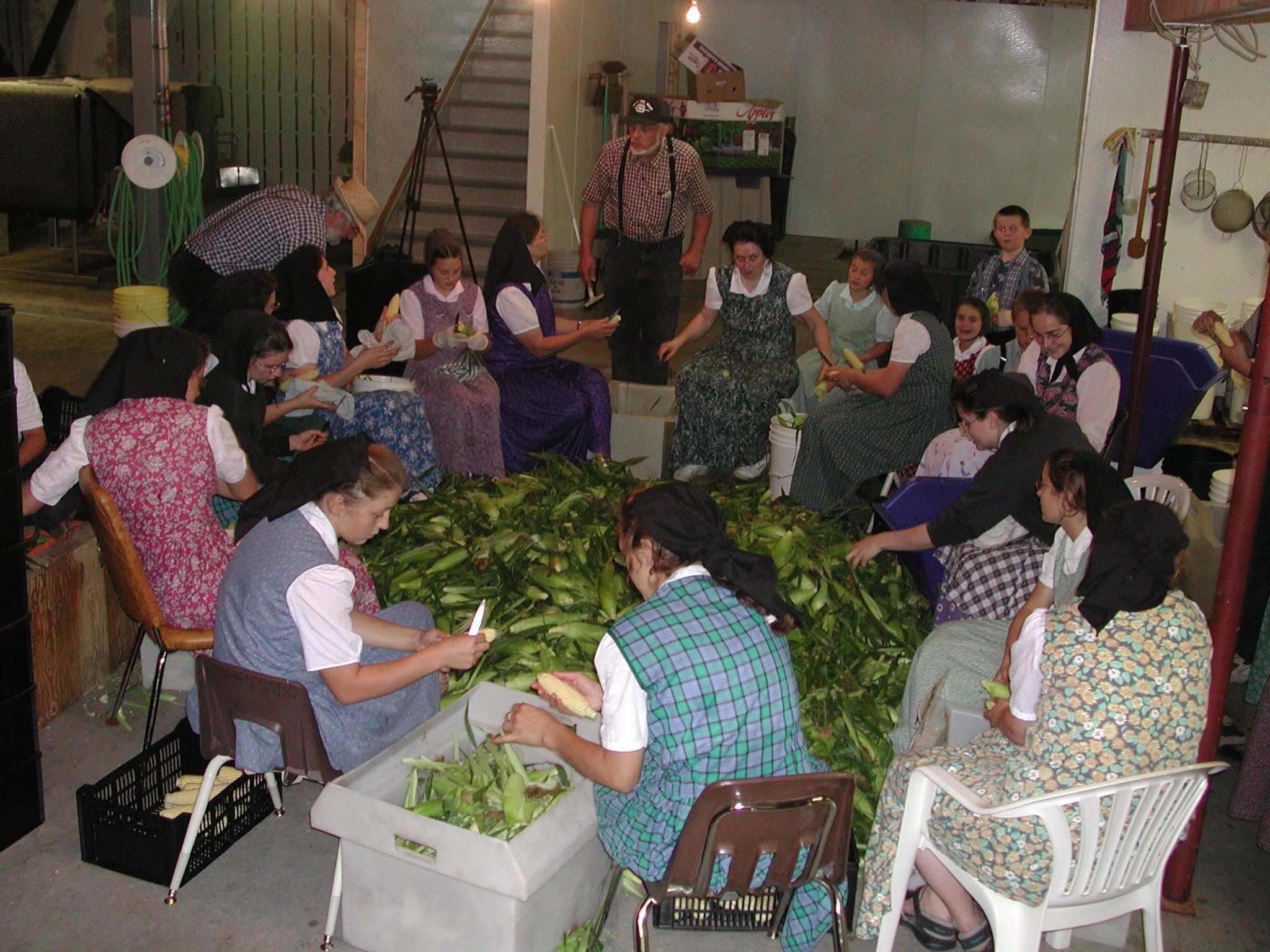
Schmiedeleut Hutterite women at work

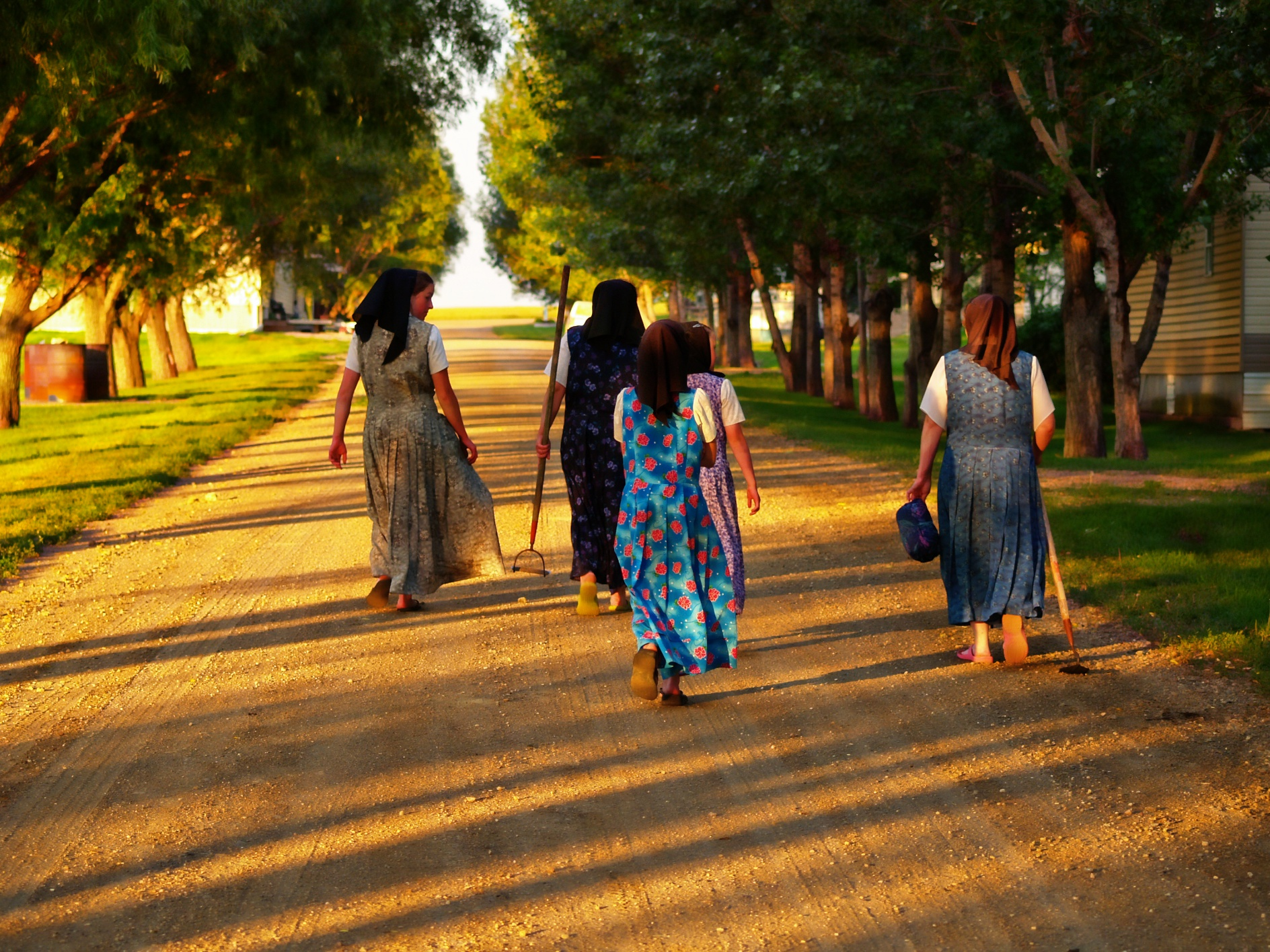
Schmiedeleut Hutterite women return from working in the fields

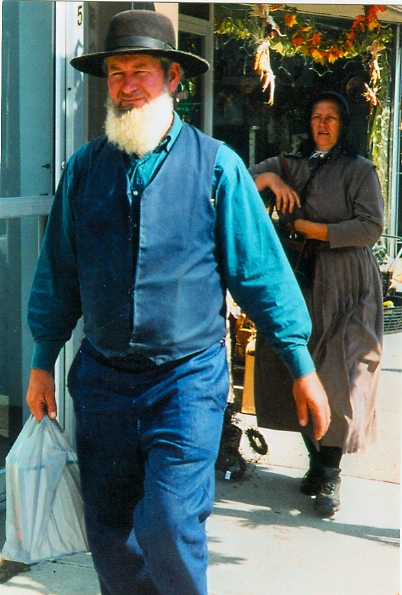
Amish in Aylmer, Ontario

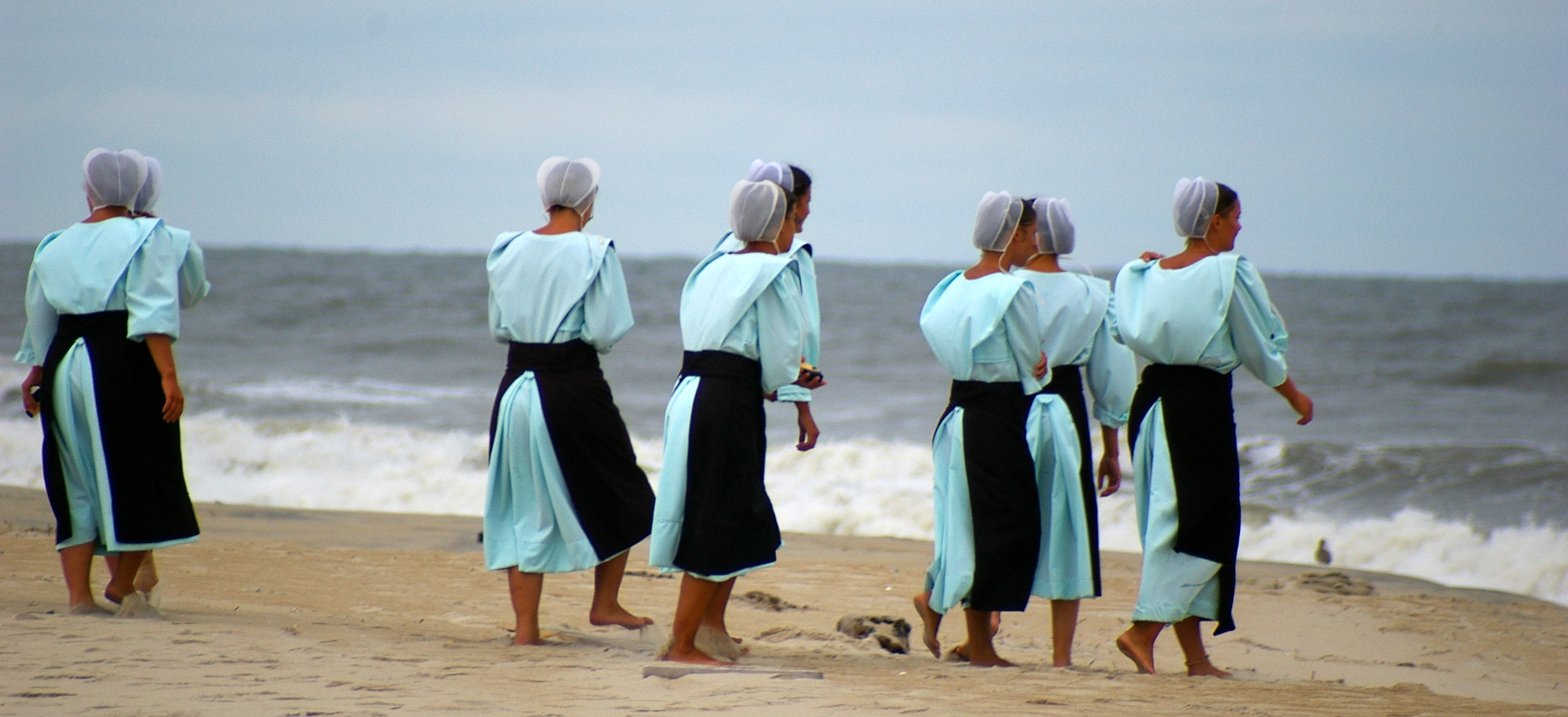
Amish women at the beach, Chincoteague, Virginia

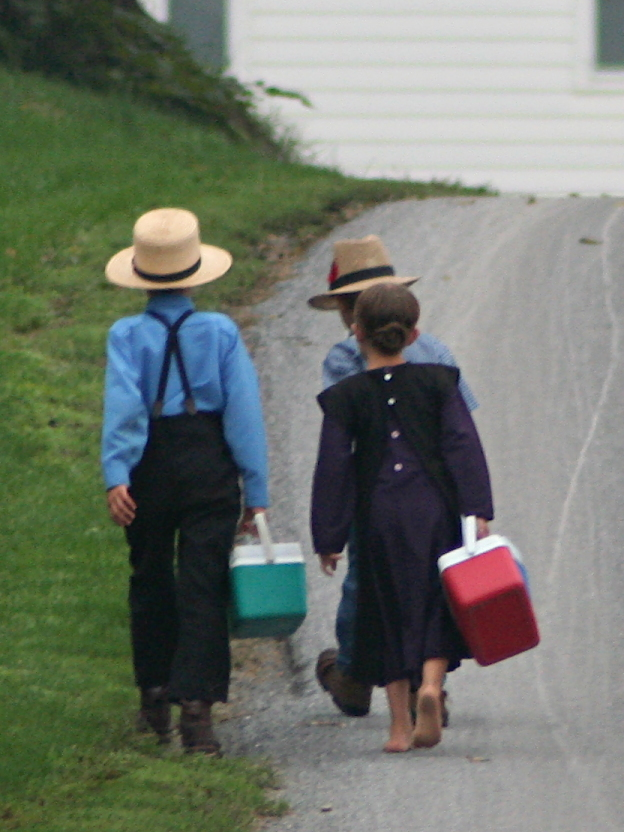
Amish children on the way to school

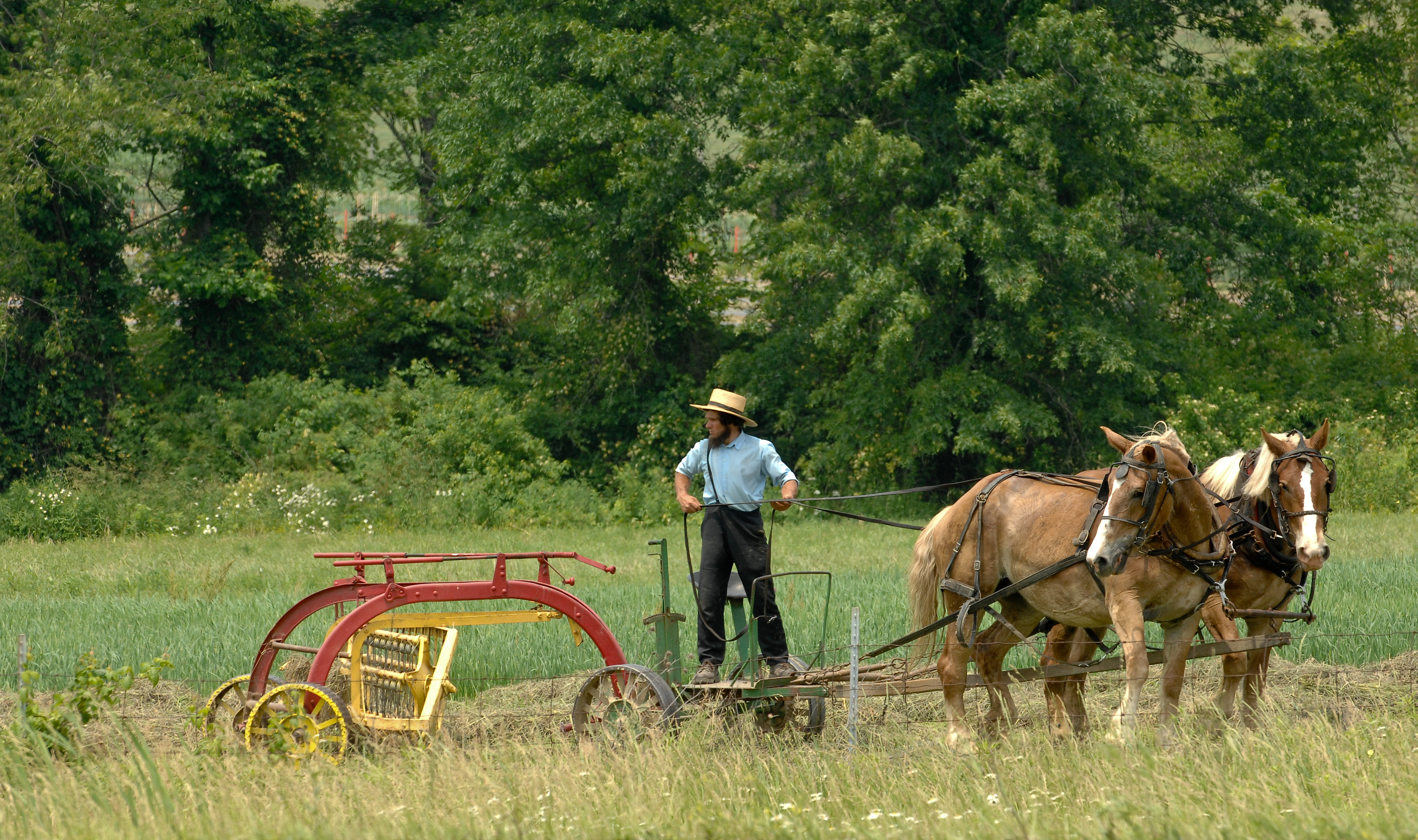
Amish man from one of the very plain "one suspender" groups in southeast Ohio

== See also ==
- Plain people
- Peace churches
- Cape dress
- Prairie dress
- Wandering journeyman
- Normcore
- Modest fashion
- Sufism
- Tazkiyah
