= Hutterite Christian Communities =

Affiliation of Hutterite colonies

The Hutterite Christian Communities are an affiliation of independent Hutterite colonies in the USA. They work closely together and also have their preachers delivering sermons in the other colonies of this affiliation.

== Colonies ==
In early 2026, there are four colonies:

- Altona Christian Community in Henderson, Minnesota, United States (independent since 2005)
- Elmendorf Christian Community in Mountain Lake, Minnesota (founded in 1994, independent since 2005)
- Fort Pitt Farms Christian Community in the Rural Municipality of Frenchman Butte No. 501, Saskatchewan, Canada (independent since 1999)
- Grand River Christian Community in Jamesport, Missouri, United States (since 2014)

=== Former colony ===
- Detention River Christian Community, formerly known as Rocky Cape Christian Community, on the Australian island of Tasmania (2005-2022)

== Population ==
In early 2026, the four communities have a total of approximately 570 people.

== History ==
Hutterites arrived in America in 1874, and formed several communities, including Schmiedeleut Hutterites.

In 1999, the Fort Pitt Hutterite Colony was excommunicated from the church.

In 2003 the Elmendorf Community was excommunicated from the Schmiedeleuts and became independent. They were supported by the Altona Community, which was then also excommunicated.

In 2006 Elmendorf Christian Community started a new community, named Rocky Cape Christian Community, on the Australian island of Tasmania. In 2014 they established Grand River Christianity Community, near the town of Jamesport, Missouri.

== See also ==
- Caneyville Christian Community
- Christian Communities (Elmo Stoll)
- Believers in Christ, Lobelville
- Michigan Amish Churches
