= G. C. Waldrep =

American poet and historian (born 1968)

- Born: George Calvin Waldrep III; 1968 (age 57–58); South Boston, Virginia
- Education: Harvard University; Duke University; University of Iowa
- Writing career
- Genre: Poetry

G. C. Waldrep (born George Calvin Waldrep III; 1968) is an American poet and historian.

== Biography ==
Waldrep was born in South Boston, Virginia. He earned undergraduate and doctoral degrees in history at Harvard University and Duke University, respectively, before receiving an MFA in creative writing from the University of Iowa.

He was visiting professor at Kenyon College, and editor of Kenyon Review. He previously taught at Bucknell University, before his retirement in December 2025, where he edited the journal West Branch. He also serves as Editor-at-Large for The Kenyon Review.

His work has appeared in Poetry, Ploughshares, Boston Review, Beloit Poetry Journal, Colorado Review, Gettysburg Review, New American Writing, American Letters & Commentary, Seneca Review, Tin House, Quarterly West, Octopus, Harper's, Gulf Coast and elsewhere.

He wrote an article about spinoff groups from the Old Order Anabaptist groups that no other scholar had covered and was thus widely received.

In 2010 he was appointed to be the final judge of the Akron Poetry Prize.

In 2012, he co-edited the poetry anthology The Arcadia Project.

He is a member of the Old Order River Brethren.

== Awards ==
- Academy of American Poets
- North Carolina Arts Council
- The PIP Gertrude Stein Award for Innovative Poetry in English
- 2001 Illinois Prize for history
- 2003 Colorado Prize for Poetry, for Goldbeater's Skin
- 2005 Campbell Corner Poetry Prize
- 2005 George Bogin Memorial Award
- 2006 Alice Fay di Castagnola Award, Poetry Society of America
- 2007 NEA grant
- 2008 Dorset Prize, for Archicembalo

== Bibliography ==
=== Poetry ===
Collections

- Goldbeater's skin: poems. Center for Literary Pub. 2003. ISBN 978-1-885635-06-8.
- The Batteries: poems. New Michigan Press. 2006. ISBN 978-0-9762092-5-6.
- Disclamor: poems. BOA Editions, Ltd. 2007. ISBN 978-1-929918-97-3.
- Archicembalo: poems. Tupelo Press. 2009. ISBN 978-1-932195-74-3.
- Your Father on the Train of Ghosts: poems. BOA Editions, Ltd. 2011. ISBN 978-1-934414-48-4. (collaboration with John Gallaher)
- feast gently: poems. Tupelo Press. 2015. ISBN 978-1938160639.
- The Earliest Witnesses: poems. Tupelo Press. 2021. ISBN 978-1-800170360.
- The Opening Ritual: poems. Tupelo Press. 2024 978-1-961209-14-5

Chapbooks

- Testament: poem. BOA Editions, Ltd. 2015. ISBN 978-1938160639.

List of poems

Title	Year	First published	Reprinted/collected
A pause	2025	Waldrep, G. C. (Winter 2025). "A pause". 32 Poems. 44: 22.	

- "III. Palm Beach, Florida, 1987"; "IV. Santa Monica, California, 1988"; "XXII. Snow Hill, Maryland, 1989"; "XXIII. Charleston, South Carolina, 1989"; "XLI. Isle of Palms, South Carolina, 1989", Typo Magazine
- "How Water Is Manufactured", Memorious 11
- "Canticle for the Second Sunday in Lent", Blackbird, Fall 2003
- "What Begins Bitterly Becomes Another Love Poem", Blackbird, Fall 2003
- "Apologia Pro Vita Tua", Poetry Daily
- "Blazon", NEA
- Waldrep, G. C. (2013). "Internal monument". In Henderson, Bill (ed.). The Pushcart Prize XXXVII : best of the small presses 2013. Pushcart Press. pp. 579–580.

=== Non-Fiction ===
- Southern workers and the search for community: Spartanburg County, South Carolina. University of Illinois Press. 2000. ISBN 978-0-252-06901-7.
- The New Order Amish and Para-Amish Groups: Spiritual Renewal Within Tradition, in The Mennonite Quarterly Review 3 (2008), pages 396–426.
- Homage to Paul Celan. Marick Press. 2012. ISBN 978-0-9779703-4-6.
