= Old Order Anabaptism =

Branch of Anabaptist Christianity

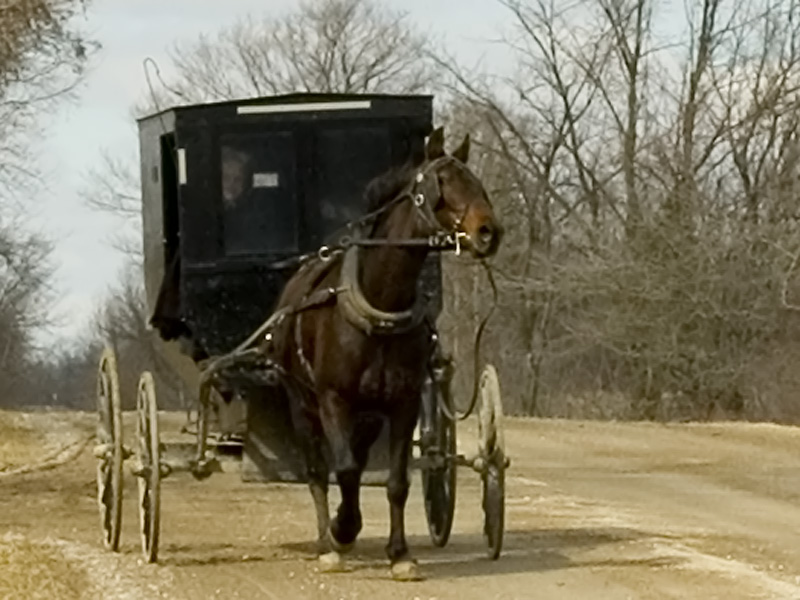
Old Order Mennonite horse and carriage in Oxford County, Ontario (2006)

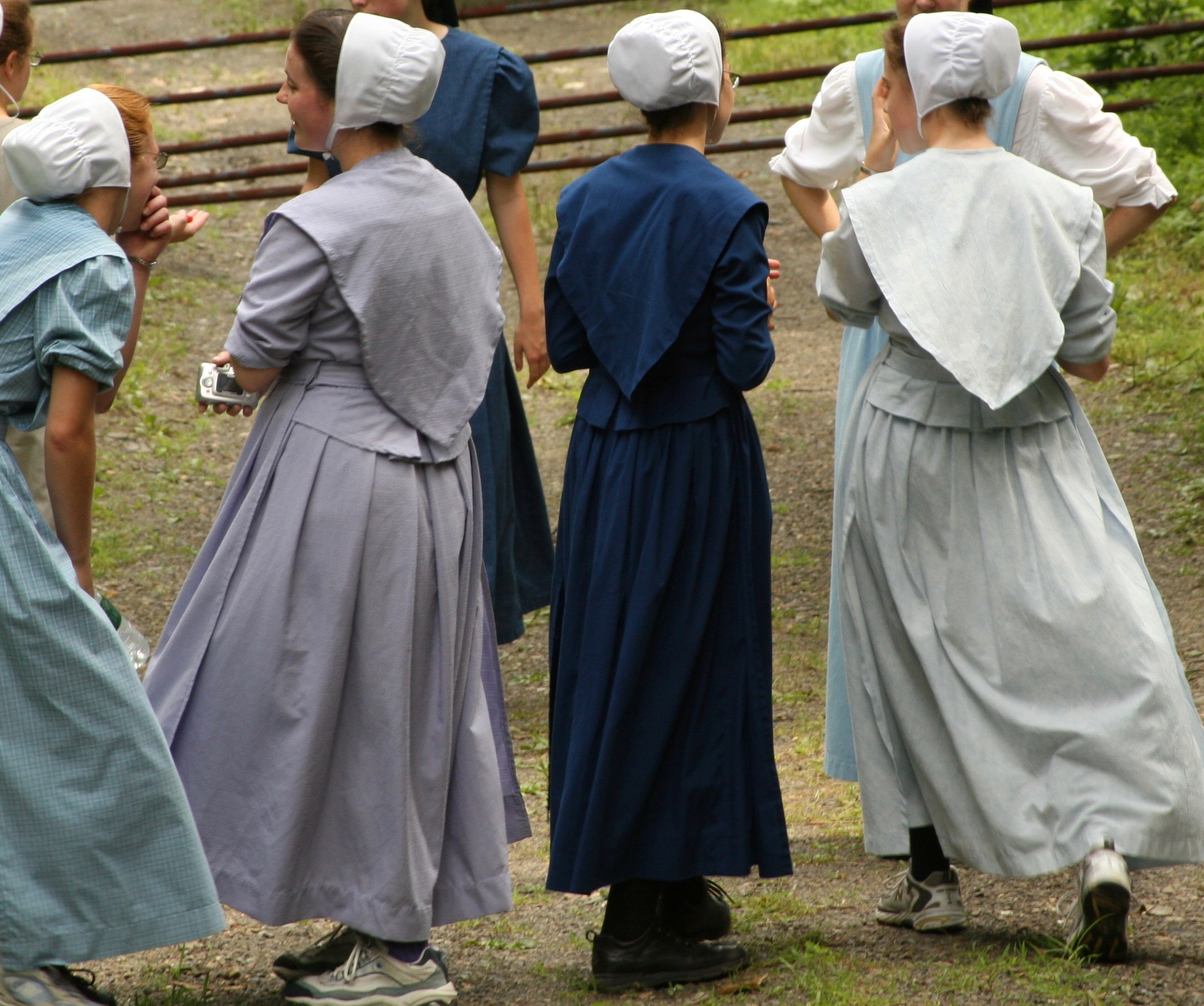
Old Order River Brethren young women wearing cape dresses and kapp headcoverings (2006)

Old Order Anabaptism is a collection of communities that have preserved the old ways of Anabaptist Christian religion and lifestyle.

Historically, an Old Order movement emerged in the second half of the 19th century among the Amish, Mennonites of South German and Swiss ancestry as well as the Schwarzenau Brethren and River Brethren in the United States and Canada. The Hutterites are additionally regarded as being Old Order Anabaptists, as they continued the practice of communal living. The Old Order movement led to several Old Order divisions from mainstream Anabaptist groups between 1845 and 1901. All Old Order Anabaptist groups that emerged after 1901 divided from established Old Order Anabaptist groups or were formed by people coming from different Old Order Anabaptist groups.

In 1989, Sandra L. Cronk wrote about the Old Order Anabaptists:

The Old Order Amish and the Old Order Mennonites [...] are not premodern relics from a bygone era. The Old Order movement is a conscious attempt to maintain a style of Christian living based on principles different from those of the larger society.

By the close of the 20th century, there were over a quarter of a million Old Order Anabaptists in North America alone. Old Order Anabaptists enjoy a rich spiritual and community life, which has attracted seekers who desire to become church members of Old Order Anabaptist denominations.

== Belief and practice ==
Old Order Anabaptist groups do not have seminary trained pastors and never developed written sophisticated theology. Many practices among the Old Orders stem from the biblical principle of nonconformity to the world, according to Romans 12:2 and other Bible verses.

The avoidance of technologies by Old Order Anabaptist communities is based not on a belief that the technology is in some way evil, but over a concern for the nature of their communities. Community is important to members of Old Order Anabaptist groups, and a technology or practice is rejected if it would adversely affect it. This means that the prohibitions are not usually absolute; a member who would not own a car may accept a ride in a car or other modern transport if a pressing need arises. This basis also means that most Old Orders see no contradiction in having electricity in their milking barn, since that is necessary to comply with regulations on milk cooling, but not in their house.

Other aspects of Old Order Anabaptist life are concerned with plainness, which dictates their distinctive dress. “Plain” to Old Orders is the opposite of showy, fancy or ostentatious, and is considered a virtue opposed to pridefulness, related to humility. It is based on the belief that a person's true worth is spiritual, and so does not lie in their clothes or appearance. The foundation of plain dress comes from the desire to obey the New Testament's instructions against outward adornment and fashionable, expensive clothing.

Nonresistance and loving one's enemies is a belief held by all Old Order groups.

According to Donald Kraybill and Carl Bowman the following additional practices are common among the Old Orders:

- A capella singing
- Believer's baptism
- Excommunication
- Fermented wine in communion
- Foot washing
- Holy Kiss
- Kneeling for prayer
- Multiple ministers lead in worship
- Ordination of leaders by lot
- Separation by gender during worship
- Self-examination before communion

=== Dress ===
All Old Order Anabaptist groups dress plain and many of their forms of dress share the same roots as the Pennsylvania Quaker dress style. The differences between Old Order Anabaptist clothing styles and the Religious Society of Friends are due to the countries of origin for these groups. Whereas Quaker men's coats were considered plain because they had no collar, the Anabaptist men's coats are considered plain because they retain the standing collar of their Bavarian, Austrian and Swiss areas of origin. Men living in these areas of Europe today often wear traditional standing collar coats, sometimes referred to as Trachten coats.

=== Buggies and cars ===
All Old Order Amish groups are horse and buggy groups, including the New Order Amish. Among the Old Order Mennonites, there are both horse and buggy and car driving groups. The same is true for the Old Orders among the Schwarzenau Brethren. The Old Order River Brethren are a car driving group, except a small subgroup of about half a dozen members, that still use horse and buggy transportation. Old Order German Baptist Brethren are a group of 3 congregations in Ohio who still use horses and buggies, and do not have electricity in their homes. The Hutterite groups are entirely car-driving.

=== Language ===
Almost all Old Order Amish groups speak a German dialect in everyday life, either Pennsylvania German, or one of two Alemannic dialects (Swiss Amish), or in the case of the Hutterites—Hutterite German. Among the Old Order Mennonites, all horse and buggy groups, except the Virginia groups, speak Pennsylvania German. The car driving groups of Old Order Mennonites shifted to English in the second half of the 20th century. The groups from which the Old Order Schwarzenau Brethren and Old Order River Brethren split, had already started shifting to English in the 19th century and mostly completed it in the first half of the 20th century.

== Demographics ==
There are about 350,000 Old Order Amish, 60,000 to 80,000 Old Order Mennonites, about 7,000 Old Order Brethren, about 350 Old Order River Brethren, and around 50,000 Hutterites. The Amish and Mennonite Old Orders have growth rates between 3 and 5 percent a year, in average about 3.7 percent. Old Order Schwarzenau and River Brethren groups in contrast have low growth rates and were even shrinking during the 20th century. All English speaking groups tend to grow much more slowly than their German speaking brothers.

== Groups ==
The Old Order Anabaptists comprise the following groups:

- Amish (selection of affiliations; there are some 40 major affiliations, partly with subgroups, and more than 100 unaffiliated congregations)
  - Nebraska Amish, the most conservative of all Old Order groups, emerged in 1881 as a split from the Byler Amish
  - Swartzentruber Amish, largest very conservative group, emerged between 1913 and 1917
  - Swiss Amish, two different groups, speak two different Alemannic dialects instead of Pennsylvania German
  - Buchanan Amish, most spread out affiliation, emerged in 1914
  - Andy Weaver Amish, relatively conservative, emerged in 1952
  - Troyer Amish, emerged in 1932 as a split from the Swartzentrubers
  - Byler Amish, a very early split, emerged in 1849
  - Renno Amish, a quite conservative group, emerged in 1863
  - Holmes Old Order Amish, second largest Amish affiliation
  - Elkhart-LaGrange Amish, third largest Amish affiliation
  - Lancaster Amish, largest Amish affiliation, relatively liberal
  - Michigan Amish Churches, emerged in the 1970s, in many aspects similar to the New Order Amish
  - New Order Amish, emerged in the 1960s, the most liberal among the Amish Old Orders
- Old Order Mennonites (groups with more than 300 members)
  - Groffdale Conference Mennonite Church, largest horse and buggy group, emerged 1927 in Pennsylvania as a split from the Weaverland Mennonite Conference
  - Weaverland Mennonite Conference, largest car driving group, emerged in 1893, allowed cars in the mid-1920s
  - Ontario Mennonite Conference, largest horse and buggy group in Canada, emerged 1889
  - Markham-Waterloo Mennonite Conference, largest car driving group in Canada, emerged 1939 as a division from the Ontario Mennonite Conference
  - Stauffer Mennonite, oldest Old Order group, emerged in 1845
  - Ohio-Indiana Mennonite Conference, emerged in 1872, now a car driving group
  - Orthodox Mennonites, emerged in 1958, a merger of several very conservative groups
  - Noah Hoover Mennonite, emerged in 1963 through a long process that started in 1940s, concerning technology the most restricted of all groups
  - David Martin Mennonites, emerged in 1917, the most isolated from other Old Order groups, do not talk about their belief with outsiders
  - Virginia Old Order Mennonite Conference, emerged in 1901, the latest Old Order split from a mainstream group
  - Reidenbach Old Order Mennonites, emerged in 1942 as a split from the Groffdale Conference, divided in very small endogamous subgroups
  - John Dan Wenger Mennonites, emerged in 1952/53 as a split from the Virginia Old Order Mennonites
- Schwarzenau Brethren
  - Old German Baptist Brethren, emerged 1881, the largest Old Order group of the Schwarzenau Brethren and more liberal than the following three groups
  - Old Brethren, emerged 1913, a bit more conservative than the Old German Baptist Brethren but in many aspects similar to them
  - Old Order German Baptist Brethren, emerged 1921, a horse and buggy group that uses tractors for field work
  - Old Brethren German Baptists, emerged 1939, a horse and buggy group that uses horses also for field work, the most conservative group
  - Old German Baptist Brethren, New Conference, emerged 2009, a more liberal split from the Old German Baptist Brethren
- Old Order River Brethren, emerged 1856, divided in three subgroups, mostly car driving, the only Old Orders among the River Brethren.
- Hutterites
  - Lehrerleut, the most traditional of the Hutterite groups that emerged in 1877
  - Schmiedeleut, Hutterite group emerging in 1859
  - Dariusleut, a branch of the Hutterites that emerged in 1860
- Para-Amish groups
  - Believers in Christ, Lobelville, emerged in 1973 when members of different Old Order groups formed a new one
  - Vernon Community, Hestand, emerged in 1996 as a split from the Believers in Christ, Lobelville
  - Caneyville Christian Community, emerged in 2004 when members of different Old Order groups formed a new one

== See also ==
- Conservative Anabaptism
