= Amish in Wisconsin =

Amish community in Wisconsin

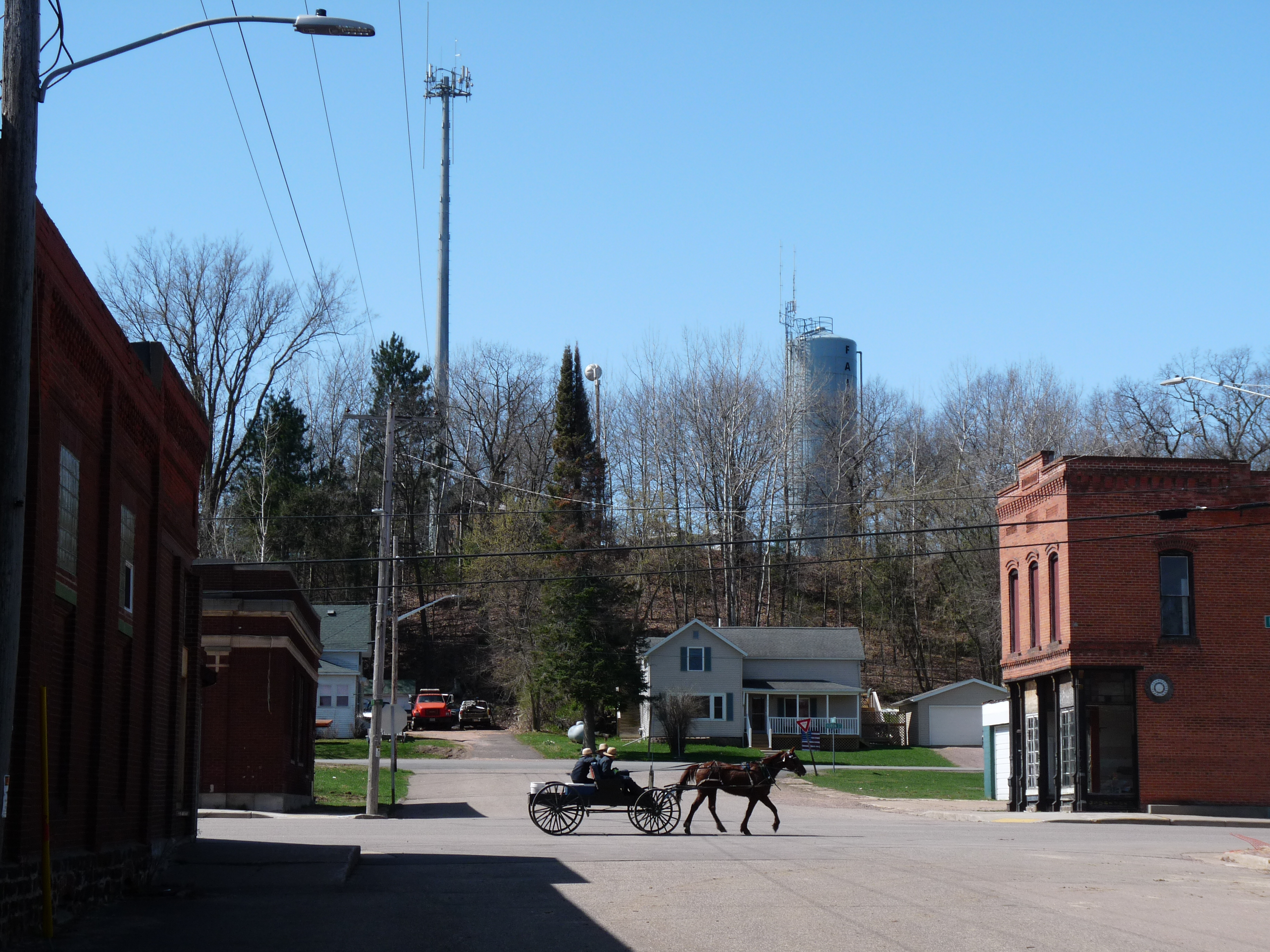
Young men driving a horse and buggy in Fairchild, Eau Claire County

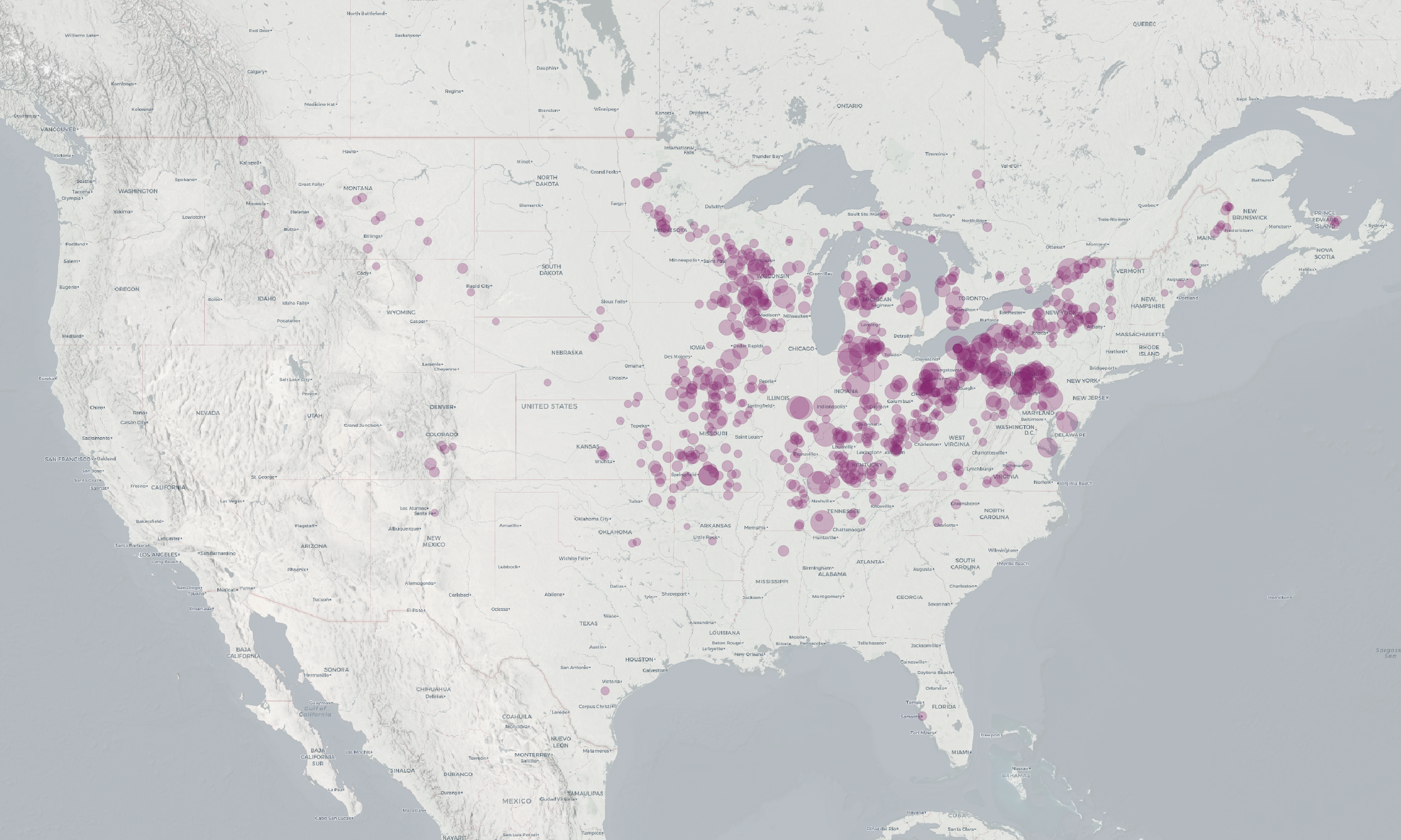
Map of Amish settlements in North America

Wisconsin has the fourth-largest Amish population in the United States, (Note: Only Pennsylvania (96,5 thousand), Ohio (87,8 th.), and Indiana (68 th.) have more Amish people.) with an estimated 28,940 adherents in 2026. The first Amish settlement was founded in 1909 by settlers from western states, but it dissolved by 1927. The oldest settlement still in existence is at Medford, founded in 1920. The Amish population of Wisconsin has grown quickly since the 1960s. The largest Amish settlement is at Cashton, followed by Kingston, Augusta, Platteville-Darlington, and Wilton-Tomah. Like Amish communities broadly, Wisconsin Amish have historically relied on dairy agriculture. However, since 2018 the proportion of Amish engaged in dairy farming has decreased.

== History ==
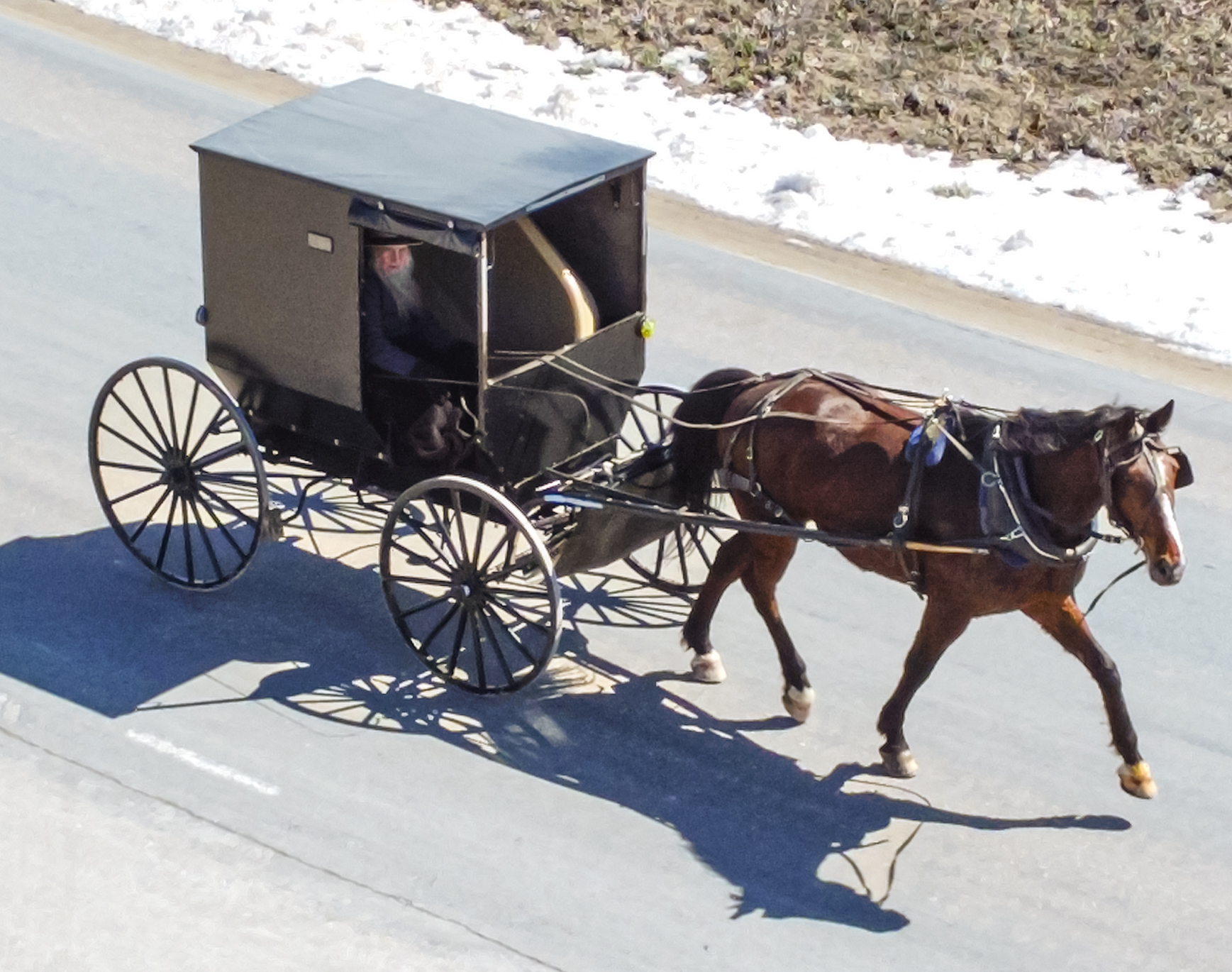
Man driving a horse and buggy in the Cashton area

The first Amish settlement in Wisconsin was established in 1909 at Exelund in Sawyer County. The Exelund settlers were from North Dakota, Montana, and other states in the west. The Exelund Amish settlement became extinct in 1927. In 1920, a settlement was founded at Medford by Amish from Kansas, which is the oldest settlement that still exists. The same year, a settlement was founded at Glen Flora in Rusk County, which survived until 1942.

The Amish population of Wisconsin has grown rapidly since the 1960s, with Amish from other states migrating to Wisconsin to maintain an agrarian lifestyle. A high birth rate, with the Amish population roughly doubling every 20 years, has also contributed to this rise.

== Demographics and distribution ==
Evolution of the Amish population in Wisconsin in recent years
Year	Pop.	±% p.a.
1992	6,785	—
2000	9,390	+4.15%
2010	15,360	+5.04%
2020	22,235	+3.77%
2021	23,195	+4.32%
2022	24,105	+3.92%
2023	24,920	+3.38%
2024	26,365	+5.80%
2025	27,535	+4.44%
2026	28,940	+5.10%
Sources: 1992, 2000, 2010, 2020s

As of 2026, the Amish population of Wisconsin is estimated at 28,940, divided into 72 settlements and 219 church districts. Wisconsin's largest settlement is at Cashton.

Most of the major groupings of Amish affiliations are found in Wisconsin. Midwestern Amish are generally moderate by Old Order standards, although Cashton is noted as being more conservative and forming its own affiliation group; it has been identified as "at the Andy Weaver-Amish level." Augusta, the third-largest settlement in Wisconsin, is associated with Cashton. Kingston, the second-largest community, is a daughter settlement of Elkhart-LaGrange in Indiana. Platteville-Darlington, Fennimore, and Chaseburg are affiliated with Lancaster Amish in Pennsylvania. There is a New Order Amish (electricity-using) settlement at Spencer, Marathon County.

The most common surnames among Wisconsin Amish are Miller, Borntrager, Yoder (which together comprised nearly half of all Amish in 2002), Gingerich, and Hershberger. These surnames, along with Amish given names, have been used by academics to map Amish presence in the state.

Amish settlements in Wisconsin with over 500 people
Settlement	County	Established	est. Amish population (2025)	est. Amish population (2026)	▲/▼
Cashton	Vernon, Monroe	1966	2,660	2,800	▲5.3%
Kingston	Green Lake, Marquette, Columbia	1977	2,520	2,660	▲5.5%
Augusta	Eau Claire	1978	1,570	1,585	▲1.0%
Platteville/Darlington	Lafayette	1999	1,545	1,620	▲4.9%
Hillsboro	Vernon, Richland	1985	1,380	1,455	▲5.4%
Wilton/Tomah	Monroe	1969	1,360	1,430	▲5.1%
Granton	Clark	1981	1,295	1,355	▲4.6%
Loyal	Clark	1989	1,065	1,115	▲4.7%
Fennimore	Grant	1998	930	990	▲6.5%
Chaseburg	Vernon	1994	765	810	▲5.9%
Loganville/Hillpoint	Sauk	1988	685	715	▲4.4%
Wautoma	Waushara, Marquette	1983	695	705	▲1.4%
Bonduel	Shawano	1987	620	625	▲0.9%
Marion	Waupaca	1995	600	630	▲5.0%
Readstown	Richland, Vernon	1990	570	575	▲0.9%

== Economy ==
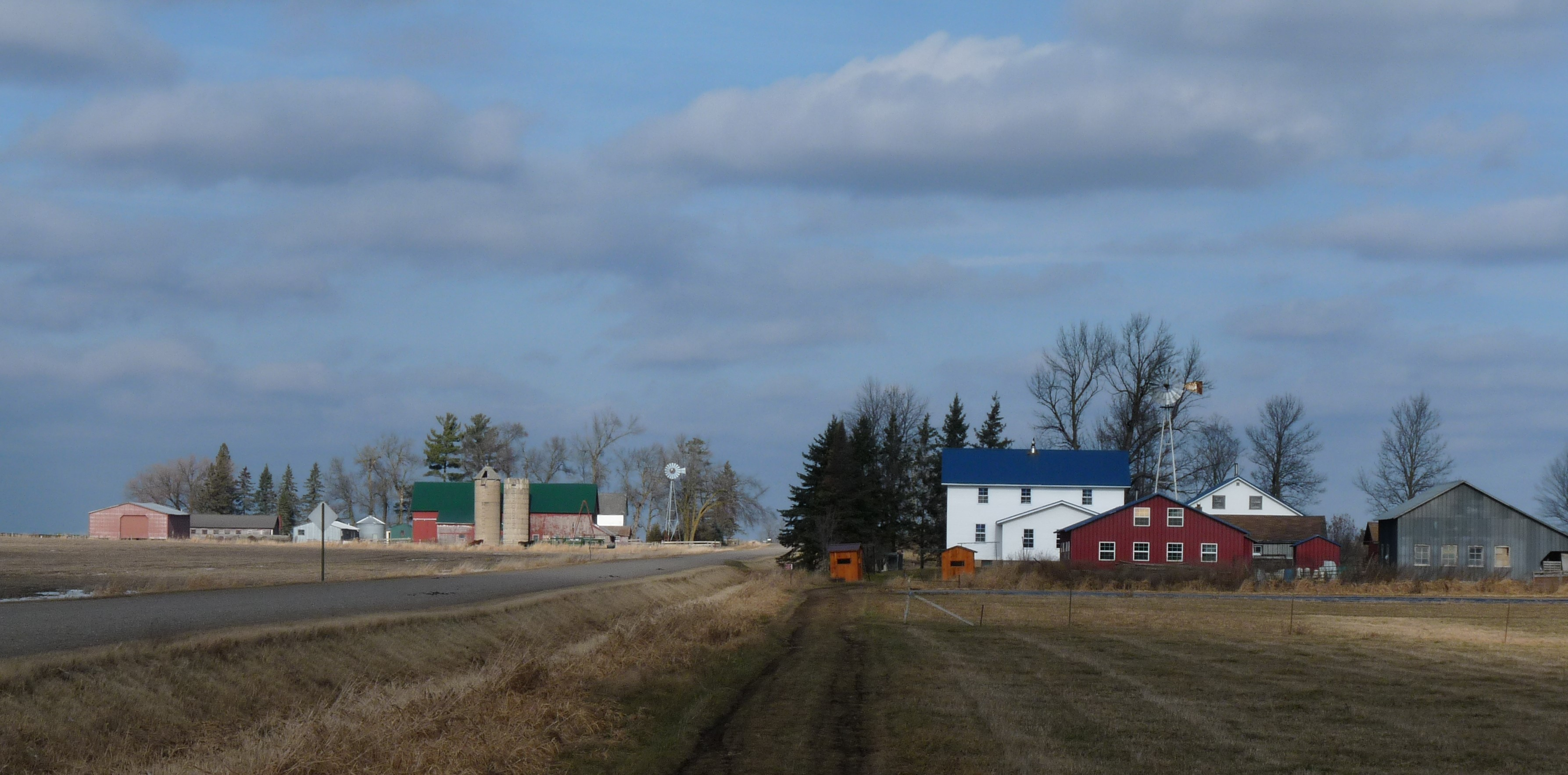
Amish farms in the vicinity of Holway, Taylor County

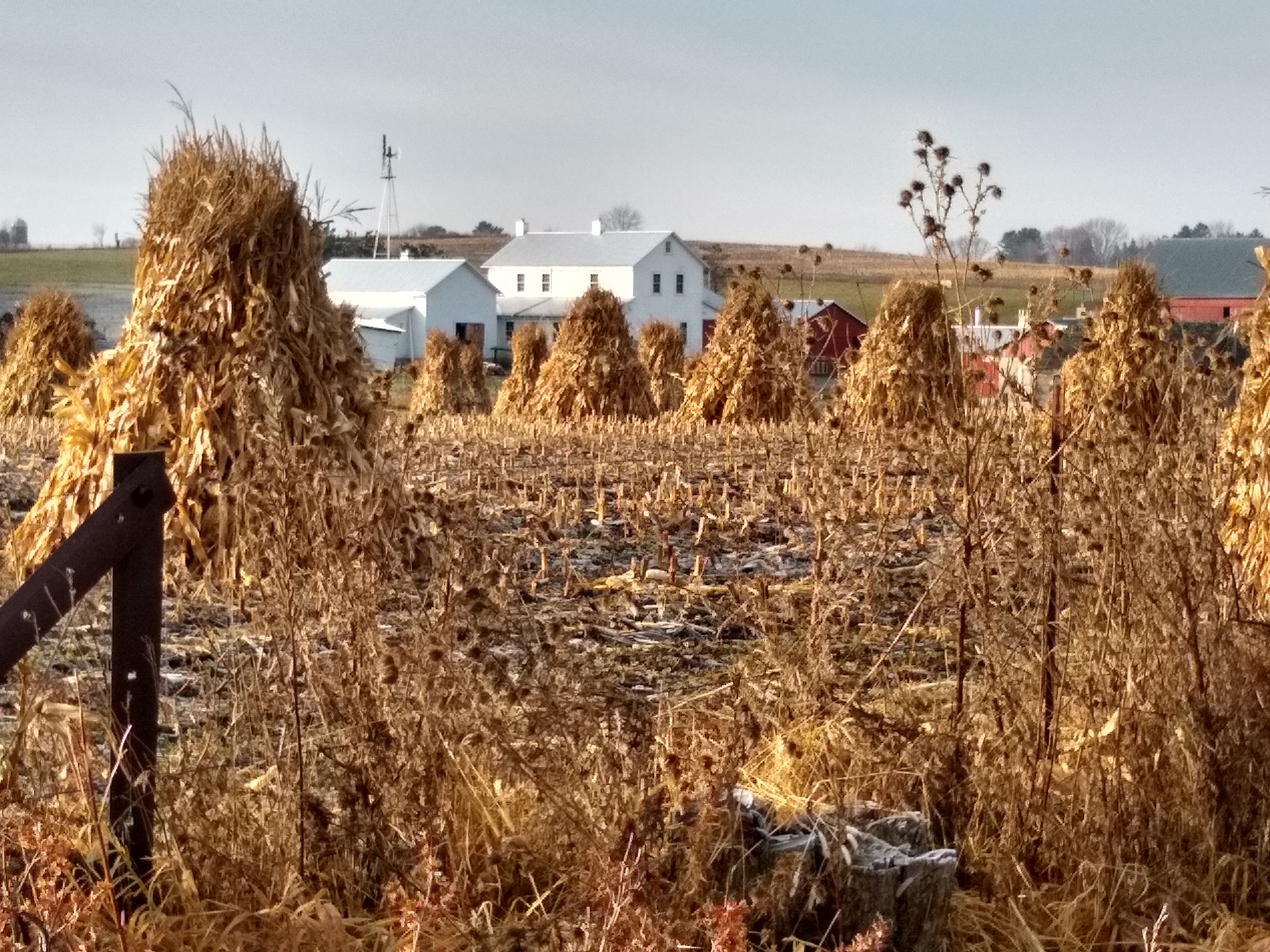
Corn shocks on an Amish farm in Weston, Clark County

The Amish are traditionally farmers. In states such as Pennsylvania and Ohio, the proportion of Amish engaged in farming has decreased due to a lack of available agricultural land. In Wisconsin this has not historically been the case, and Amish from eastern states have migrated to Wisconsin seeking to preserve an agrarian lifestyle. In 2016, around 10% of dairy herds in Wisconsin were Amish-owned, and the majority of Amish households engaged in dairy agriculture. Amish engagement in dairy farming continued to expand even as the total number of dairy farms has decreased; by 2018, Amish families owned almost 13% of dairy herds in Wisconsin. From 2018 onward, Amish dairy herds have begun to decrease due to lower milk prices and other economic pressures. A trade war started by US president Donald Trump which resulted in other countries putting tariffs on American dairy exports, as well as poor weather in 2018 and 2019, put stress on dairy farmers in Wisconsin. Amish farms who used milk cans (as opposed to bulk milk tanks) were particularly affected.

== Healthcare ==
The Amish are predisposed to genetic disorders, due to being a largely closed community (with few converts and outside marriages) and the founder effect. Disorders known to be more prevalent among Plain Anabaptist communities include phenylketonuria, maple syrup urine disease, and severe combined immunodeficiency. Disorders which cause severe neurological disease among infants are particularly prevalent among Amish communities.

Amish people do not reject modern medicine, but it is not routinely used. They also do not typically do preventative care, such as vaccines and brushing teeth. Generally, the Amish prefer to rely on faith and folk medicine. Amish folk medicine involves herbalists, lay midwives, and brauche healers.

In Wisconsin, medical professionals and academics have made outreach efforts to Amish communities, such as the Swartzentruber settlement in Clark County. Plain Anabaptists in Wisconsin have been described as medically underserved. A rural clinic in La Farge, which is near a number of Amish communities, has established an outreach program to provide healthcare and evaluations for genetic and metabolic disorders.
