= Andy Weaver Amish =

Andy Weaver Amish may refer to:

- Andy Weaver (Old Order Amish), an exceptionally conservative group within the Old Order Amish
- Andy Weaver (Swartzentruber), an exceptionally conservative group within the Swartzentruber Amish, which are the most conservative of the major Amish groups
