= Swartzentruber =

Swartzentruber may refer to:

- Don Swartzentruber, an American artist
- Naomi Swartzentruber, an American author and content creator
- Swartzentruber Amish, a subgroup of the Old Order Amish

== See also ==
- Brandon Swartzendruber (*1985), an American soccer player
