= Holmes Old Order Amish affiliation =

The Holmes Old Order Amish affiliation is a subgroup of Amish, that is almost only present at the Holmes-Wayne Amish settlement in Ohio. With 140 church districts there in 2009 it is the main and dominant Amish affiliation there, even though there were 61 another church districts of 10 other affiliations in the settlement. It is third in numbers of adherents of all Amish affiliation.

== History ==
The Holmes County Amish settlement was founded in 1808 and the Holmes Old Order Amish affiliation was the main Amish body there, from which many other Amish affiliations separated, for example the Swartzentruber Amish in 1913 or the Andy Weaver Amish in 1952. In the early 1960s, one of the two major New Order Amish groups emerged in the Holmes County Amish settlement.

== Practice and belief ==
The Holmes Old Order Amish affiliation is not very conservative concerning the use of technology, but more conservative than the Lancaster Amish affiliation and parts of the Elkhart-LaGrange affiliation, see table below.

Affiliation	Tractor for fieldwork	Roto-tiller	Power lawn mower	Propane gas	Bulk milk tank	Mechanical milker	Mechanical refrigerator	Pickup balers	Inside flush toilet	Running water bath tub	Tractor for belt power	Pneumatic tools	Chain saw	Pressurized lamps	Motorized washing machines
Swartzentruber	No	No	No	No	No	No	No	No	No	No	No	Some	No	No	Yes
Nebraska	No	No	No	No	No	No	No	Some	No	No	No	No	Some	No	Yes
Swiss (Adams)	No	No	Some	No	No	No	No	No	Some	No	No	Some	Some	Some	Some
Buchanan/Medford	No	No	No	No	No	No	No	No	No	No	No	Some	No	Yes	Yes
Danner	No	No	No	Some	No	No	Some	No	Yes	Yes	Yes	No	No	Yes	No
Geauga I	No	No	No	No	No	No	No	Some	Yes	Yes	Yes	Yes	Yes	Yes	Yes
Holmes	No	Some	Some	No	No	No	Some	Yes	Yes	Yes	Yes	Yes	Yes	Yes	Yes
Elkhart-LaGrange	No	Some	Some	Some	Some	Some	Some	Some	Yes	Yes	Yes	Yes	Yes	Yes	Yes
Lancaster	No	No	Some	Yes	No	Yes	Yes	Yes	Yes	Yes	Yes	Yes	Yes	Yes	Yes
Nappanee	No	Yes	Yes	Yes	Yes	Yes	Yes	Yes	Yes	Yes	Yes	Yes	Yes	Yes	Yes
Kalona	Yes	Yes	Yes	Yes	Yes	Yes	Yes	Yes	Yes	Yes	Yes	Yes	Yes	Yes	Yes
Percentage of use by all Amish	6	20	25	30	35	35	40	50	70	70	70	70	75	90	97

Unlike in most other Amish communities, a significant percentage of children from the Holmes County Old Orders attend local public schools, which in turn have often adapted to accommodate Amish practices.

== Settlements and districts ==
In 2011 the Holmes Old Orders were present in only one state, Ohio, in only two settlements, but with 147 church districts. It represents about 7 percent of the Old Order Amish population, that is about 20,000 people out of about 300,000 in 2015. It is the most geographically concentrated of all other Amish affiliations.

== Literature ==
- Charles Hurst and David McConnell: An Amish Paradox. Diversity and Change in the World's Largest Amish Community, Johns Hopkins University Press, Baltimore MD 2010 ISBN 9780801893988
- Jon Kinney: The Amish of Holmes County: A Culture, A Religion, a Way of Life, Orrville, Ohio 1996.
- Steven Nolt and Thomas J. Meyers: Plain Diversity: Amish Cultures and Identities, Baltimore MD 2007. ISBN 9780801886058
- Donald B. Kraybill: The Riddle of Amish Culture, Baltimore MD 2002. ISBN 9780801867712
- Donald B. Kraybill, Karen M. Johnson-Weiner and Steven M. Nolt: The Amish, Johns Hopkins University Press, Baltimore MD 2013. ISBN 9781421425665
