= Nebraska Amish =

Most conservative Amish subgroup

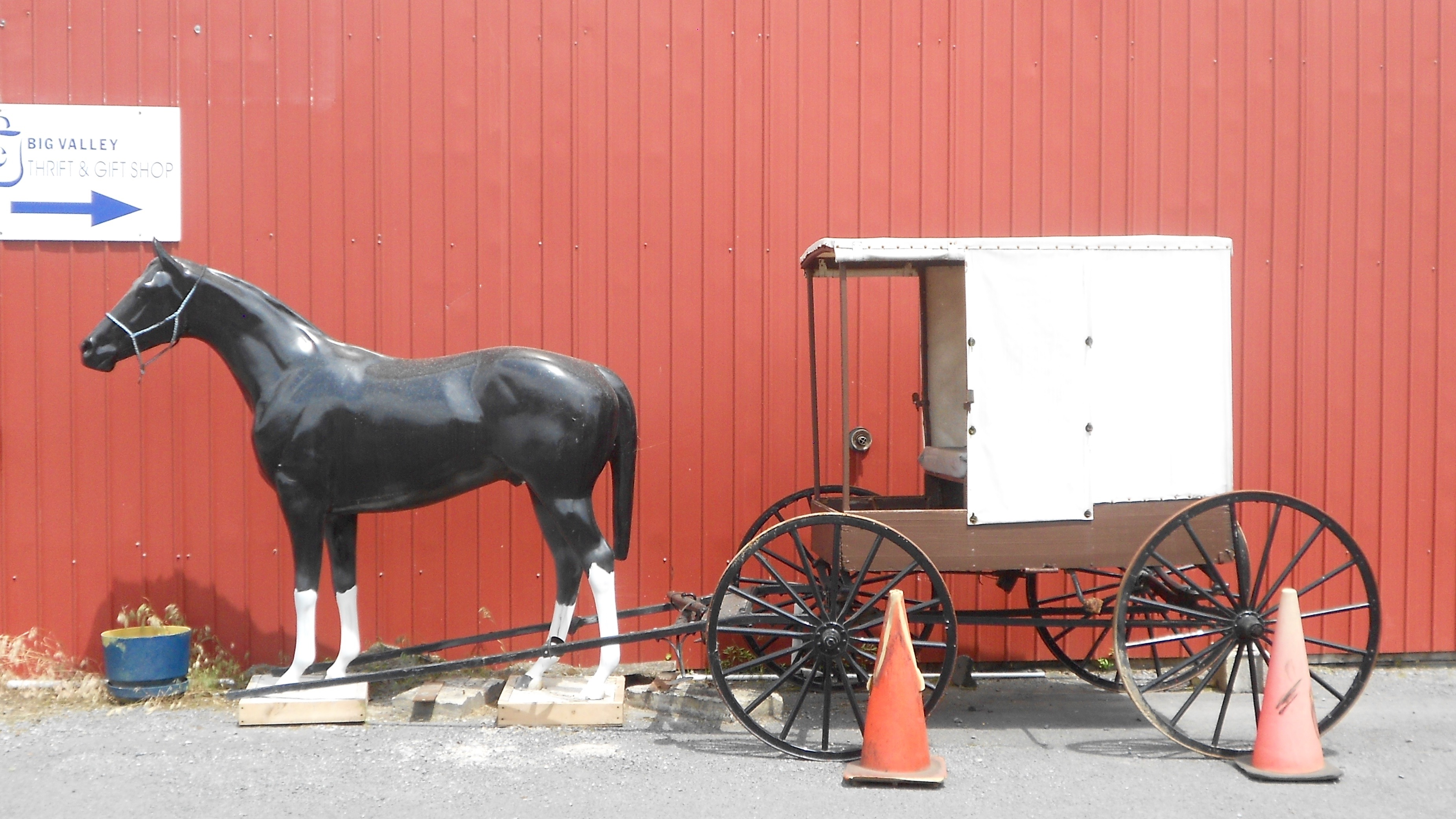
White-topped buggy of the Nebraska Amish

The Nebraska Amish, also called Old Schoolers, are a relatively small affiliation of the Amish. They are the most conservative subgroup of Amish, indicated not only by their use of technology but also by their particular style of dress. They emerged in 1881 as a conservative split from the Byler Amish, who themselves emerged as the first conservative splinter group from the Amish mainstream in 1849.

== History ==
Amish settled in the Mifflin County region of Pennsylvania – the Kishacoquillas Valley – as early as 1791, coming from Lancaster County, Pennsylvania. In the 1840s there were three Amish congregations in the region with a membership of 290. In 1849 Samuel B. King, a conservative bishop who warned against adopting the use of rubber tires on buggies and who was also accused of giving sermons that were too long, was "silenced", that is he was removed from his ministerial duties. One of the three districts, the "lower" district sided with King and split from the other two districts forming the Byler Amish as the first conservative split from the Amish mainstream in North America.

Around 1880, Bishop Yost H. Yoder from the Kishacoquillas Valley settlement led nine families from Juniata County, Pennsylvania, to Gosper County in south-central Nebraska, founding an Old Order Amish settlement there in the hope of maintaining their traditional distinct church and family life.

Yoder went back to the Kishacoquillas Valley in Pennsylvania in 1881 to assist in the establishment of a conservative splinter group originating from the Byler Amish. Yoder eventually became the leader of the new group. Because Yoder had been living in Nebraska for some time, the group was nicknamed the Nebraska Amish by others.

In 1933, a group called the Zook faction broke away from the Nebraska Amish over the use of projecting roof gables, and formed a separate district, holding their own worship services and having their own bishops. The Zook group split again in 1978. Though differences exist, they are almost unnoticeable to outsiders. Since the late 1970s they have split several times. Groups include the Rufus Zook group, the Chris Yoder group, and others.

In the early 1980s several church districts of the Swartzentruber Amish in Minnesota, Tennessee, and Ohio split from the Swartzentruber church districts elsewhere because of disagreements over shunning ("Bann und Meidung"). This group, known as the "Jeck Jeckey Leit" is now affiliated with the Nebraska Amish.

== Practice and belief ==
Nebraska Amish dress the most conservatively of all Amish groups. Their dress is quite different from other Old Order groups because it is less influenced by the plain dress that the Quakers had developed earlier. Men are known for not wearing suspenders, trousers are laced up in the back instead. Men also wear white shirts, brown denim trousers and jackets and hair at shoulder length. The hats of the men are very broad brimmed. Women do not wear bonnets, wearing black kerchiefs and flat straw hats instead. Women in the Kish Valley and in Union County do not wear straw hats but wear white bonnet like prayer caps and in cold weather wear black head scarves over the bonnet. The head scarves are often monogrammed with names or initials. Many of the monograms are completed with fabric paint rather than using thread.

Concerning the use of technologies, the Nebraska Amish are about as restrictive as the Swartzentruber Amish, see table below. Like other Old Order Amish, the Nebraska Amish do not use motorized equipment or indoor plumbing. Other differences include the fact that they do not place screens on their doors or windows, men only wear white shirts, curtains are not used in homes, buggy tops must be white, men's hair must be shoulder length, no lawn mowers are allowed and houses must not have projecting roofs. Recently it was observed in the Kish Valley front mountain Nebraska Amish several minor changes have taken place. LED lights are now replacing kerosene lanterns on buggies and inside homes. The power tool batteries are charged using small solar panels. The retail price of white kerosene in the valley is currently at $7.999 a gallon so these changes could be economically related. Recently at Amish auctions, used stainless steel lamp reflectors were being sold as they are no longer needed with kerosene lanterns being replaced with 20-volt LED household lamps.

Affiliation	Tractor for fieldwork	Roto-tiller	Power lawn mower	Propane gas	Bulk milk tank	Mechanical milker	Mechanical refrigerator	Pickup balers	Inside flush toilet	Running water bath tub	Tractor for belt power	Pneumatic tools	Chain saw	Pressurized lamps	Motorized washing machines
Swartzentruber	No	No	No	No	No	No	No	No	No	No	No	Some	No	No	Yes
Nebraska	No	No	No	No	No	No	No	Some	No	No	No	No	Some	No	Yes
Swiss (Adams)	No	No	Some	No	No	No	No	No	Some	No	No	Some	Some	Some	Some
Buchanan/Medford	No	No	No	No	No	No	No	No	No	No	No	Some	No	Yes	Yes
Danner	No	No	No	Some	No	No	Some	No	Yes	Yes	Yes	No	No	Yes	No
Geauga I	No	No	No	No	No	No	No	Some	Yes	Yes	Yes	Yes	Yes	Yes	Yes
Holmes	No	Some	Some	No	No	No	Some	Yes	Yes	Yes	Yes	Yes	Yes	Yes	Yes
Elkhart-LaGrange	No	Some	Some	Some	Some	Some	Some	Some	Yes	Yes	Yes	Yes	Yes	Yes	Yes
Lancaster	No	No	Some	Yes	No	Yes	Yes	Yes	Yes	Yes	Yes	Yes	Yes	Yes	Yes
Nappanee	No	Yes	Yes	Yes	Yes	Yes	Yes	Yes	Yes	Yes	Yes	Yes	Yes	Yes	Yes
Kalona	Yes	Yes	Yes	Yes	Yes	Yes	Yes	Yes	Yes	Yes	Yes	Yes	Yes	Yes	Yes
Percentage of use by all Amish	6	20	25	30	35	35	40	50	70	70	70	70	75	90	97

Because Nebraska Amish have a relatively small number of youth, they allow dating over the line. So young people of different Nebraska Amish groups can date each other; however, when they want to marry they have to decide which of the groups they will join. The Nebraska Amish practice bundling.

== Members and congregations ==
In 1900 the Old School—i.e., the Nebraska Amish—had 2 districts with 159 members, in 1956 the original Yoder group had 70 and the Zook group 60 members. As of 2000, the Nebraska Amish had 14 church districts and 775 members and a total population of 1,744, mostly in northeastern Mifflin County. As of 2011 they had 19 church districts in 5 settlements. The main Nebraska Amish settlement is found in Mifflin County, Pennsylvania, with small extensions into Centre, Huntingdon, and Union counties. There are 3 other Nebraska Amish settlements in Pennsylvania and one settlement near Andover, Ohio, just at the border to Pennsylvania, which was founded in 1992.
