= Buchanan Amish affiliation =

Amish subgroup located in Buchanan County, Iowa

The Buchanan Amish affiliation is a subgroup of Amish that was formed in 1914 in Buchanan County, Iowa. It is among the most conservative in the entire Amish world. It is the fourth largest of all Amish affiliations, having almost as many church districts as the Holmes Old Order Amish affiliation. Geographically it is more dispersed than any other Amish affiliation.

== History ==
The Buchanan Amish affiliation emerged in 1914 when seven families from the Kalona Amish settlement in Johnson County, Iowa (established in 1846), moved to Buchanan County, seeking a more conservative church discipline. Later they were joined by families from Kansas, Wisconsin, Indiana and other places. In 1912 there had been a conflict over the use of telephones in the Kalona Amish settlement that led to a division in which many change-minded families had left the Old Order church to establish a more liberal Amish Mennonite church.

Part of the conflict about compulsory education past 8th grade — which was settled by the Wisconsin v. Yoder case of the United States Supreme Court — took place among the Buchanan affiliation in Buchanan County. The famous photo of November 1965, showing Amish school children running into a cornfield to flee the police, was taken in Buchanan County.

== Customs and belief ==
There is a very limited use of technology among the Buchanan affiliation, quite similar to the Swartzentruber Amish and the Swiss Amish of Adams County, Indiana. The Buchanan Amish affiliation was known in the 1980s for its conservatism and slowness to change their customs. They do not allow running water in homes, flush toilets, bath tubs, pneumatic tools, chainsaws, bicycles and scooters. For more details, see below:

| Affiliation | Tractor for fieldwork | Roto-tiller | Power lawn mower | Propane gas | Bulk milk tank | Mechanical milker | Mechanical refrigerator | Pickup balers | Inside flush toilet | Running water bath tub | Tractor for belt power | Pneumatic tools | Chain saw | Pressurized lamps | Motorized washing machines |
|---|---|---|---|---|---|---|---|---|---|---|---|---|---|---|---|
| Swartzentruber | No | No | No | No | No | No | No | No | No | No | No | Some | No | No | Yes |
| Nebraska | No | No | No | No | No | No | No | Some | No | No | No | No | Some | No | Yes |
| Swiss (Adams) | No | No | Some | No | No | No | No | No | Some | No | No | Some | Some | Some | Some |
| Buchanan/Medford | No | No | No | No | No | No | No | No | No | No | No | Some | No | Yes | Yes |
| Danner | No | No | No | Some | No | No | Some | No | Yes | Yes | Yes | No | No | Yes | No |
| Geauga I | No | No | No | No | No | No | No | Some | Yes | Yes | Yes | Yes | Yes | Yes | Yes |
| Holmes | No | Some | Some | No | No | No | Some | Yes | Yes | Yes | Yes | Yes | Yes | Yes | Yes |
| Elkhart-LaGrange | No | Some | Some | Some | Some | Some | Some | Some | Yes | Yes | Yes | Yes | Yes | Yes | Yes |
| Lancaster | No | No | Some | Yes | No | Yes | Yes | Yes | Yes | Yes | Yes | Yes | Yes | Yes | Yes |
| Nappanee | No | Yes | Yes | Yes | Yes | Yes | Yes | Yes | Yes | Yes | Yes | Yes | Yes | Yes | Yes |
| Kalona | Yes | Yes | Yes | Yes | Yes | Yes | Yes | Yes | Yes | Yes | Yes | Yes | Yes | Yes | Yes |
| Percentage of use by all Amish | 6 | 20 | 25 | 30 | 35 | 35 | 40 | 50 | 70 | 70 | 70 | 70 | 75 | 90 | 97 |

== Settlements and districts ==
In 2011 the Buchanan affiliation was present in 19 states in 67 settlements with 140 church districts. It represents about 7 percent of the Old Order Amish population, that is about 20,000 people out of about 300,000 in 2015. It is present in more states than any other Amish affiliation and with 67 settlements it has the most settlements of all Amish affiliations.

== Literature ==
- Steven Dale Reschly: The Amish on the Iowa Prairie, 1840-1910, Baltimore and London, 2000.
- Clara Nisley and Miriam Hershberger: History and Happenings of the Buchanan County Amish, 1914-1997, Sugarcreek, OH 1999.
- Elmer Schwieder and Dorothy Schwieder: A Peculiar People: Iowa’s Old Order Amish, Iowa City 1975.
- Charles Hurst and David McConnell: An Amish Paradox: Diversity and Change in the World's Largest Amish Community, Johns Hopkins University Press, Baltimore MD 2010 ISBN 9780801893988
- Steven Nolt and Thomas J. Meyers: Plain Diversity: Amish Cultures and Identities, Baltimore MD 2007. ISBN 9780801886058
- Donald B. Kraybill: The Riddle of Amish Culture, Baltimore MD 2001.
- Donald B. Kraybill, Karen M. Johnson-Weiner and Steven M. Nolt: The Amish, Johns Hopkins University Press, Baltimore MD 2013. ISBN 9781421425665
