= Naomi Swartzentruber =

American author and social-media content creator

- Born: 1980 (age 45–46); Michigan, U.S.
- Occupation: Author · social-media personality
- Years active: 2023–present (author); 1999–2020 (exotic dancer)
- Known for: Memoir: The Amazing Adventures of an Amish Stripper (2023)
- Partner: Nick Bauer
- Children: 1
- Website: Instagram

Naomi Swartzentruber (born 1980) is an American author and social-media content creator whose 2023 self-published memoir, The Amazing Adventures of an Amish Stripper, recounts her departure from a conservative Amish upbringing, two decades as an exotic dancer, and her subsequent recovery from addiction. She shares reflections on Amish culture and sobriety with more than 400,000 followers on TikTok and Instagram.

== Early life ==
Naomi Swartzentruber was born in 1980 on a dairy farm in a Swartzentruber Amish district of rural Michigan, a subgroup that bans electricity, telephones and most motorized equipment. She is the ninth of twelve children, seven brothers and four sisters. She began rebelling: at night she and her cousins drove with non-Amish boys, smoked cigarettes, drank beer and had sex.

Caught sneaking out in early 1997, the 17-year-old concluded she would "never know true independence" if she stayed and feared being forced into baptism, which would bring lifelong shunning should she leave. She stole her birth certificate from her father's desk and enlisted a non-Amish log buyer to help her escape, leaving him a voicemail that asked to be collected at midnight. On 13 July 1997 she pushed out her window screen, climbed onto the roof, jumped twelve feet to the ground and hid in a shed until dawn, then telephoned the couple from a neighbor's house and was driven to safety. With their guidance she obtained a driver's permit the day after her 18th birthday and started her first wage job at Burger King, later saying she sought "freedom and technology" even though she feared she "was going to go to hell" for leaving.

== Career ==
Swartzentruber has described her entry into exotic dancing as accidental. In an April 2024 interview on Jesse Watters Primetime she said that, after running away from home at age 17, she accompanied a friend to a Minneapolis strip club where the dancers brought her backstage, dressed her in a "hot-pink bikini" and pushed her onto the stage; the US$55 she earned that night persuaded her to keep performing.

A separate profile in People adds that she was then working at Burger King, and the tip money "covered a week's rent," launching a career that lasted about twenty years. During that time she also engaged in escort work and developed a cocaine and crack-cocaine addiction, which she later called "a blur of cash, drugs, and self-loathing." Swartzentruber told Watters that dancing gave her "a sense of empowerment" and that, for the first time in her life, she felt she "owned [her] sexuality."

She eventually retired from performing during the COVID-19 pandemic and after the birth of her daughter in 2021, redirecting her experiences into a memoir and social-media advocacy.

== Social-media work and personal life ==
After retiring from dancing, Swartzentruber began posting short videos as @Amishinspiration on TikTok and Instagram. Her clips, often filmed in her Arizona kitchen, demonstrate Amish-inspired gardening, natural cleaning mixtures of vinegar, baking soda and dish soap, and reflections on sobriety. By late 2024 she had amassed "more than 400,000 followers across platforms." Her TikTok cleaning-tip videos also drew tabloid attention; an April 2024 feature in The Sun highlighted a clip in which she explained that her Amish family sometimes used newspaper instead of toilet paper in their outhouse.

Away from social media she lives near Phoenix, Arizona, with her partner Nick Bauer and their daughter, born in 2021. Swartzentruber remains in regular contact with her Amish parents, who do not approve of Bauer and avoid discussing her memoir or stripping career, yet she describes the relationship as now "great" and built on mutual respect. Her parents have not read her memoirs. Swartzentruber discussed the dynamic at length on the Cults to Consciousness podcast, saying she hopes her transparency helps others reconcile with their families.

== Selected works ==
- The Amazing Adventures of an Amish Stripper (self-published, 2023) ISBN 979-8-9882632-1-0
