= Elkhart-LaGrange Amish affiliation =

Amish Christian subgroup

The Elkhart-LaGrange Amish affiliation is the second largest Old Order Amish affiliation and as such a subgroup of Amish. Its origin and main settlement lie in Elkhart and LaGrange counties in Indiana. While the Amish of Holmes County, Ohio, and adjacent counties split into several different affiliations in the last 100 years, the Elkhart-LaGrange affiliation remained united, but with a considerable internal diversity. The Elkhart-LaGrange affiliation had 177 church districts in 2011.

== History ==
The Elkhart-LaGrange Amish settlement was founded in 1841.

== Practice and belief ==
The Elkhart-LaGrange Amish affiliation is quite liberal compared to other Amish affiliations concerning the use of technology. Regulations of the Ordnung may vary considerably from district to neighboring district as can be seen in the table below, where "some" (yellow) indicates non-uniform regulations:

Affiliation	Tractor for fieldwork	Roto-tiller	Power lawn mower	Propane gas	Bulk milk tank	Mechanical milker	Mechanical refrigerator	Pickup balers	Inside flush toilet	Running water bath tub	Tractor for belt power	Pneumatic tools	Chain saw	Pressurized lamps	Motorized washing machines
Swartzentruber	No	No	No	No	No	No	No	No	No	No	No	Some	No	No	Yes
Nebraska	No	No	No	No	No	No	No	Some	No	No	No	No	Some	No	Yes
Swiss (Adams)	No	No	Some	No	No	No	No	No	Some	No	No	Some	Some	Some	Some
Buchanan/Medford	No	No	No	No	No	No	No	No	No	No	No	Some	No	Yes	Yes
Danner	No	No	No	Some	No	No	Some	No	Yes	Yes	Yes	No	No	Yes	No
Geauga I	No	No	No	No	No	No	No	Some	Yes	Yes	Yes	Yes	Yes	Yes	Yes
Holmes	No	Some	Some	No	No	No	Some	Yes	Yes	Yes	Yes	Yes	Yes	Yes	Yes
Elkhart-LaGrange	No	Some	Some	Some	Some	Some	Some	Some	Yes	Yes	Yes	Yes	Yes	Yes	Yes
Lancaster	No	No	Some	Yes	No	Yes	Yes	Yes	Yes	Yes	Yes	Yes	Yes	Yes	Yes
Nappanee	No	Yes	Yes	Yes	Yes	Yes	Yes	Yes	Yes	Yes	Yes	Yes	Yes	Yes	Yes
Kalona	Yes	Yes	Yes	Yes	Yes	Yes	Yes	Yes	Yes	Yes	Yes	Yes	Yes	Yes	Yes
Percentage of use by all Amish	6	20	25	30	35	35	40	50	70	70	70	70	75	90	97

== Settlements and districts ==
In 2011 the Elkhart-LaGrange affiliation was present in 3 states in 9 settlements with 177 church districts, forming the second largest Amish affiliation. It represents about 7 percent of the Old Order Amish population, that is about 20,000 people out of about 300,000 in 2015. It is the most geographically concentrated of the larger Amish affiliations.

== Literature ==
- Charles Hurst and David McConnell: An Amish Paradox. Diversity and Change in the World's Largest Amish Community, Johns Hopkins University Press, Baltimore MD 2010 ISBN 9780801893988
- Steven Nolt and Thomas J. Meyers: Plain Diversity: Amish Cultures and Identities, Baltimore MD 2007. ISBN 9780801886058
- Thomas J. Meyers and Steven M. Nolt: An Amish Patchwork: Indiana's Old Orders in the Modern World. Bloomington, IN et al. 2005. ISBN 9780253345387
- Donald B. Kraybill: The Riddle of Amish Culture, Baltimore MD 2001. ISBN 9780801867712
- Donald B. Kraybill, Karen M. Johnson-Weiner and Steven M. Nolt: The Amish, Johns Hopkins University Press, Baltimore MD 2013. ISBN 9781421425665
