= Lancaster Amish affiliation =

Subgroup of Amish

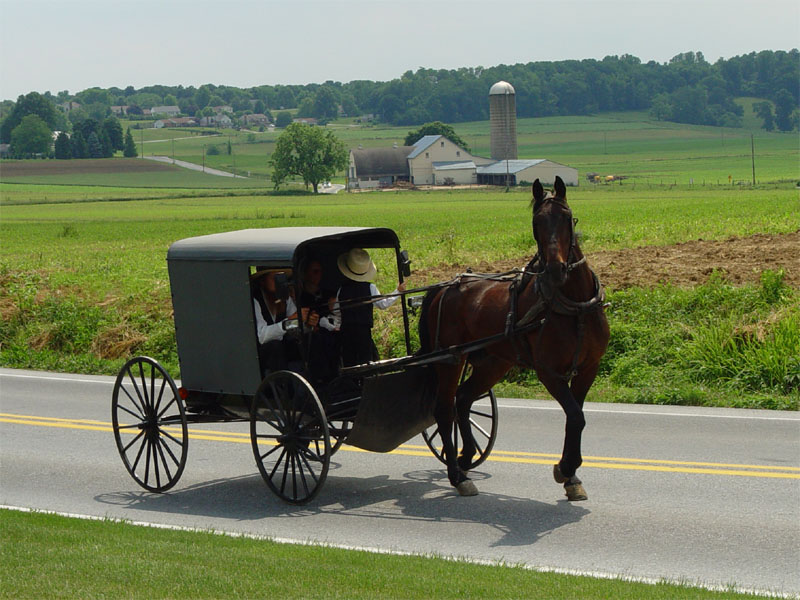
A grey top buggy of the Lancaster Amish affiliation.

The Lancaster Amish affiliation is the largest affiliation among the Old Order Amish and as such a subgroup of Amish. Its origin and largest settlement is Lancaster County, Pennsylvania, United States. The settlement in Lancaster County, founded in 1760 near Churchtown is the oldest Amish settlement that is still in existence.

== Practice and belief ==
Even though the Lancaster affiliation is quite liberal concerning the use of technology compared to other Amish affiliations (see table below), it is an affiliation that practices strenge Meidung (strict shunning). Lancaster affiliation buggies have gray tops.

Affiliation	Tractor for fieldwork	Roto-tiller	Power lawn mower	Propane gas	Bulk milk tank	Mechanical milker	Mechanical refrigerator	Pickup balers	Inside flush toilet	Running water bath tub	Tractor for belt power	Pneumatic tools	Chain saw	Pressurized lamps	Motorized washing machines
Swartzentruber	No	No	No	No	No	No	No	No	No	No	No	Some	No	No	Yes
Nebraska	No	No	No	No	No	No	No	Some	No	No	No	No	Some	No	Yes
Swiss (Adams)	No	No	Some	No	No	No	No	No	Some	No	No	Some	Some	Some	Some
Buchanan/Medford	No	No	No	No	No	No	No	No	No	No	No	Some	No	Yes	Yes
Danner	No	No	No	Some	No	No	Some	No	Yes	Yes	Yes	No	No	Yes	No
Geauga I	No	No	No	No	No	No	No	Some	Yes	Yes	Yes	Yes	Yes	Yes	Yes
Holmes	No	Some	Some	No	No	No	Some	Yes	Yes	Yes	Yes	Yes	Yes	Yes	Yes
Elkhart-LaGrange	No	Some	Some	Some	Some	Some	Some	Some	Yes	Yes	Yes	Yes	Yes	Yes	Yes
Lancaster	No	No	Some	Yes	No	Yes	Yes	Yes	Yes	Yes	Yes	Yes	Yes	Yes	Yes
Nappanee	No	Yes	Yes	Yes	Yes	Yes	Yes	Yes	Yes	Yes	Yes	Yes	Yes	Yes	Yes
Kalona	Yes	Yes	Yes	Yes	Yes	Yes	Yes	Yes	Yes	Yes	Yes	Yes	Yes	Yes	Yes
Percentage of use by all Amish	6	20	25	30	35	35	40	50	70	70	70	70	75	90	97

== Settlements and districts ==
Lancaster affiliation had 141 church districts in 1991 and 286 in 2010. In 2011 it was present in eight states in 37 settlements with 291 church districts. It represents about 15 percent of the Old Order Amish population, that is about 45,000 out of about 300,000 in 2015.

== Literature ==
- Donald B. Kraybill, Karen M. Johnson-Weiner and Steven M. Nolt: The Amish, Johns Hopkins University Press, Baltimore MD 2013. ISBN 9781421425665
- Charles Hurst and David McConnell: An Amish Paradox. Diversity and Change in the World's Largest Amish Community, Johns Hopkins University Press, Baltimore MD 2010 ISBN 9780801893988
- Steven Nolt and Thomas J. Meyers: Plain Diversity: Amish Cultures and Identities, Baltimore MD 2007. ISBN 9780801886058
- Donald B. Kraybill: The Riddle of Amish Culture, Baltimore MD 2002. ISBN 9780801867712
