= Andy Weaver (Old Order Amish) =

Subgroup of Old Order Amish

The Andy Weaver Amish, locally also called "Dan Church", "Dan Amish" or "Danners", are a conservative subgroup of Old Order Amish. They are more conservative than average Old Order Amish.

Andy Weaver Amish are considered a subgroup of the Old Order Amish, although they do not fellowship or intermarry with more liberal Old Order Amish. They speak Pennsylvania German as their mother tongue as well as English with outsiders.

A subgroup of the Swartzentruber Amish is also called "Andy Weaver".

== History ==
In Holmes County, Ohio, the Andy Weaver Amish were formed in 1952 over the issue of shunning. They were named after Andrew J. Weaver, a conservative minister who took a stand against "drift", that is moving towards mainstream society.

== Customs and technology ==
They are less conservative than the Swartzentruber Amish but more conservative than the Old Order main body. Compared to them they have greater restrictions on farm, business and home technologies, a stricter interpretation of shunning, stricter youth regulations and a greater tolerance of alcohol and tobacco.

Affiliation	Tractor for fieldwork	Roto-tiller	Power lawn mower	Propane gas	Bulk milk tank	Mechanical milker	Mechanical refrigerator	Pickup balers	Inside flush toilet	Running water bath tub	Tractor for belt power	Pneumatic tools	Chain saw	Pressurized lamps	Motorized washing machines
Swartzentruber	No	No	No	No	No	No	No	No	No	No	No	Some	No	No	Yes
Nebraska	No	No	No	No	No	No	No	Some	No	No	No	No	Some	No	Yes
Swiss (Adams)	No	No	Some	No	No	No	No	No	Some	No	No	Some	Some	Some	Some
Buchanan/Medford	No	No	No	No	No	No	No	No	No	No	No	Some	No	Yes	Yes
Danner	No	No	No	Some	No	No	Some	No	Yes	Yes	Yes	No	No	Yes	No
Geauga I	No	No	No	No	No	No	No	Some	Yes	Yes	Yes	Yes	Yes	Yes	Yes
Holmes	No	Some	Some	No	No	No	Some	Yes	Yes	Yes	Yes	Yes	Yes	Yes	Yes
Elkhart-LaGrange	No	Some	Some	Some	Some	Some	Some	Some	Yes	Yes	Yes	Yes	Yes	Yes	Yes
Lancaster	No	No	Some	Yes	No	Yes	Yes	Yes	Yes	Yes	Yes	Yes	Yes	Yes	Yes
Nappanee	No	Yes	Yes	Yes	Yes	Yes	Yes	Yes	Yes	Yes	Yes	Yes	Yes	Yes	Yes
Kalona	Yes	Yes	Yes	Yes	Yes	Yes	Yes	Yes	Yes	Yes	Yes	Yes	Yes	Yes	Yes
Percentage of use by all Amish	6	20	25	30	35	35	40	50	70	70	70	70	75	90	97

== Districts and populations ==
Most of the Andy Weaver Amish live in Holmes County, Ohio, where they had 30 church districts in 2009. There are three other settlements, including a settlement in Ashland County, Ohio, and in one upstate New York. All together, there were 40 church districts in 2011.

Andy Weaver Amish have the highest rates of retention of their children in the church among all Amish. The retention rate is estimated at 97%. On the other hand Andy Weavers have left agriculture on a larger scale than other Amish with only 6% active in farming.

== Literature ==
- Donald B. Kraybill, Karen M. Johnson-Weiner and Steven M. Nolt: The Amish, Johns Hopkins University Press, Baltimore MD 2013. ISBN 9781421425665
- Karen Johnson-Weiner: New York Amish: Life in the Plain Communities of the Empire State, Cornell University Press, Ithaca, NY 2017. ISBN 9781501707605
- Charles Hurst and David McConnell: An Amish Paradox. Diversity and Change in the World's Largest Amish Community, Johns Hopkins University Press, Baltimore MD 2010 ISBN 9780801893988
