= Troyer Amish =

Subgroup of Old Older Amish

The Troyer Amish or Stutzman-Troyer Amish are a conservative subgroup of Old Order Amish.

== History ==
In 1932 bishop Eli A. Troyer withdrew from the Swartzentruber Amish in the Holmes/Wayne County settlement in Ohio and began the Troyer church in Wayne County, Ohio. He did this over several issues, e.g. Bann (excommunication) and hat brims.

Swartzentruber wore hats the same as the rest of the Amish up to this time. Up to 1942 free moving from one sect to another was also allowed without penalty in the Troyer Church.

== Beliefs and practices ==
Troyer Amish are very conservative. Their order resembles that of the Swartzentruber. They do not allow indoor plumbing, linoleum flooring, carpeting, upholstered furniture, or lamps powered by means other than oil. It is forbidden to ride in a car unless it is an emergency. Their primary focus for income is farming and dairy products, though they do allow themselves to work with the Englishers and tourist trade.

== Settlements and populations ==
The Troyer church eventually moved to numerous locations in Pennsylvania, New York, Michigan and Canada as did the Swartzentruber Church. In 1949 the Troyer Amish started a settlement in the Conewango Valley in New York. In 2010 there was only one church district left in the Holmes/Wayne County Amish settlement, where they originated.

As of 2011 the Troyer Amish had 53 church districts in 6 states.

== Literature ==
- Donald B. Kraybill, Karen M. Johnson-Weiner and Steven M. Nolt: The Amish, Johns Hopkins University Press, Baltimore MD 2013. ISBN 9781421425665
- Charles Hurst and David McConnell: An Amish Paradox. Diversity and Change in the World's Largest Amish Community, Johns Hopkins University Press, Baltimore MD 2010 ISBN 9780801893988
