= Subgroups of Amish =

Over the years, as Amish churches have divided many times over doctrinal disputes, subgroups have developed. The "Old Order Amish", a conservative faction that withdrew in the 1860s from fellowship with the wider body of Amish, are those that have most emphasized traditional practices and beliefs. There are many different subgroups of Amish with most belonging, in ascending order of conservatism, to the Beachy Amish, New Order, Old Order, or Swartzentruber Amish groups.

== Amish affiliations ==
Donald B. Kraybill, Karen M. Johnson-Weiner and Steven M. Nolt speak of different Amish "affiliations" in their book The Amish. They define an affiliation as "a cluster of two or more districts with at least twenty years of shared history". They continue: "affiliated congregations share similar Ordnungs, which specify distinctive lifestyles and visible symbols that set them apart from other affiliations". When referring to affiliations, Amish themselves speak of "our people" (unser Leit) and "our way" to do things. By 2012 there were more than 40 affiliations, with smaller subgroups within some affiliations counted, there were more than 65. In addition to that, there were more than 130 fairly independent congregations.

The majority of affiliations reflects mainly the different local Ordnungen (Orders) in different Amish settlements, e.g., Lancaster Amish, Elkhart-LaGrange Amish or Holmes Old Order Amish, even though there are also other differences. Other affiliations are the result of splits over major questions, such as shunning, and reflect Ordnungen that are either more conservative or more progressive than the Old Order mainstream. Examples for this are the Swartzentruber and Kenton Amish (very conservative), Andy Weaver Amish (conservative) and Michigan Amish Churches of Amish, which still use horse-drawn carriages, but are considered by many to be relatively liberal.

Amish convert and independent scholar Christopher Petrovich has challenged Kraybill, Johnson-Weiner, and Nolt's definitions of an affiliation on the grounds that their delineations of affiliations rest on somewhat arbitrary grounds, that they conflate the concept of a settlement and religious affiliation, that their imposition of a 20-year minimum of shared history to count as an affiliation is not only arbitrary but is inconsistently applied, and that their fragmenting of the Amish world into tiny factions not only ignores the reality of Amish religious relations but is useless to researchers looking for an ordinal scale of affiliations.

Petrovich proposes that Amish affiliations be sorted along the following variables: (1) Shared identity arising from historic breaches in fellowship (2) Disciplinary procedures (3) Technology allowances and prohibitions (4) Theological beliefs (5) Community practices

From these criteria, he identifies six Amish religious affiliations: (1) Swartzentruber (2) Kenton (3) Andy Weaver (4) Old Order-mainstream (5) New Order-traditional (6) New New Order

Kraybill et al.'s original scheme critiqued by Petrovich is provided in "Amish affiliations Ranked by Number and Church Districts, 2011":

Affiliation	Date estab- lished	Origin	States	Settle- ments	Church districts
Lancaster	1760	Pennsylvania	8	37	291
Elkhart-LaGrange	1841	Indiana	3	9	177
Holmes Old Order	1808	Ohio	1	2	147
Buchanan/Medford	1914	Indiana	19	67	140
Geauga I	1886	Ohio	6	11	113
Swartzentruber	1913	Ohio	15	43	119
Geauga II	1962	Ohio	4	27	99
Swiss (Adams)	1850	Indiana	5	15	86
Troyer	1931	Ohio	6	17	53
Swiss (Allen)	1852	Indiana	7	17	46
Dover, Delaware	1915	Delaware	10	16	42
Andy Weaver/Dan	1955	Ohio	1	4	40
Nappanee, Indiana	1841	Indiana	1	1	37
New Order non-electric	1967	Ohio	7	13	35
Arthur, Illinois	1864	Illinois	2	4	31
New Wilmington, Pennsylvania	1847	Pennsylvania	2	6	28
Daviess	1868	Indiana	1	1	26
Kenton	1953	Indiana	6	13	25
Ashland	1954	Ohio	6	9	23
Jamesport/Bloomfield	1953	Missouri	3	5	20
Michigan-related	1970	Michigan	3	15	20
Nebraska	1881	Pennsylvania	2	5	19
Renno	1863	Pennsylvania	2	4	19
New Order-electric	1972	Pennsylvania	6	16	17
Fredericktown	1972	Ohio	2	4	15
Kalona, Iowa	1846	Iowa	1	3	13
Kansas/Oklahoma	1883	Kansas	3	6	12
Milverton, Ontario	1824	Ontario	1	4	12
Missouri/Illinois	1960	Missouri	2	9	11
Somerset	1772	Pennsylvania	3	6	10
Tobe Hostetler	1940	Ohio	1	4	10
Milroy/West Union	1969	Indiana	3	3	9
Guys Mills/Fredonia	1972	Pennsylvania	2	4	7
Aylmer	1953	Ontario	1	3	5
Byler	1849	Pennsylvania	2	1	5
New Order-Tobe	1967	Ohio	1	1	5
Abe Miller	1970	Tennessee	2	3	4
New Order Fellowship	1983	Ohio	3	4	4
Turbotville	1970	Pennsylvania	1	1	3
Kokomo	1848	Indiana	1	1	2
Subtotal	n/a	n/a		410	1,780
Unclassified	n/a	n/a			133
Total	n/a	n/a			1,913

=== Use of technology by different Old Order Amish affiliations ===
The table below indicates the use of certain technologies by different Amish affiliations. The use of cars is not allowed by all Old and New Order Amish, as well as radio, television and in most cases the use of the internet. The three affiliations: "Lancaster", "Holmes Old Order" and "Elkhart-LaGrange" are not only the three largest affiliations, they also represent the Old Order mainstream among the Amish. The most conservative affiliations are above, the most modern ones below. Technologies used by very few are on the left, the ones used by most are on the right. The percentage of all Amish, who use a technology is also indicated approximately.

Affiliation	Tractor for fieldwork	Rototiller	Power lawn mower	Propane gas	Bulk milk tank	Mechanical milker	Mechanical refrigerator	Pickup balers	Inside flush toilet	Running water bath tub	Tractor for belt power	Pneumatic tools	Chain saw	Pressurized lamps	Motorized washing machines
Percentage of use by all Amish	6	20	25	30	35	35	40	50	70	70	70	70	75	90	97
Swartzentruber	No	No	No	No	No	No	No	No	No	No	No	Some	No	No	Yes
Nebraska	No	No	No	No	No	No	No	Some	No	No	No	No	Some	No	Yes
Swiss (Adams)	No	No	Some	No	No	No	No	No	Some	No	No	Some	Some	Some	Some
Buchanan/Medford	No	No	No	No	No	No	No	No	No	No	No	Some	No	Yes	Yes
Milverton, Ontario	No	No	No	No	No	Yes	No	No	No	No	No	Yes	Yes	Yes	Yes
Dover, Delaware	No	No	No	No	No	No	No	No	Yes	Yes	Yes	Yes	Yes	Yes	Yes
Andy Weaver/Dan	No	No	No	No*	No	No	No	No	Yes	Yes	Yes	Yes	Yes	Yes	Yes
Geauga I	No	No	No	No	No	No	No	Some	Yes	Yes	Yes	Yes	Yes	Yes	Yes
Aylmer	No	No	Yes	No	Yes	No	No	No	Yes	Yes	Yes	Yes	Yes	Yes	Yes
Renno	No	No	No	No	Some	No	Some	Yes	Yes	Yes	Yes	Yes	Yes	Yes	Yes
Holmes Old Order	No	Some	Some	No*	No	No	Some	Yes	Yes	Yes	Yes	Yes	Yes	Yes	Yes
Elkhart-LaGrange	No	Some	Some	Some	Some	Some	Some	Some	Yes	Yes	Yes	Yes	Yes	Yes	Yes
Lancaster	No	No	Some	Yes	Yes	Yes	Yes	Yes	Yes	Yes	Yes	Yes	Yes	Yes	Yes
Nappanee, Indiana	No	Yes	Yes	Yes	Yes	Yes	Yes	Yes	Yes	Yes	Yes	Yes	Yes	Yes	Yes
Arthur, Illinois	No	Yes	Yes	Yes	Yes	Yes	Yes	Yes	Yes	Yes	Yes	Yes	Yes	Yes	Yes
New Order Non-electric	No	Yes	Yes	Yes	Yes	Yes	Yes	Yes	Yes	Yes	Yes	Yes	Yes	Yes	Yes
Somerset	Yes	Yes	Yes	Yes	Yes	Yes	Yes	Yes	Yes	Yes	Yes	Yes	Yes	Yes	Yes
Kalona, Iowa	Yes	Yes	Yes	Yes	Yes	Yes	Yes	Yes	Yes	Yes	Yes	Yes	Yes	Yes	Yes

* Natural gas allowed

== Old Order Amish ==
Old Order Amish are the main group of Amish who resisted innovations both in society and in church work. A series of conferences held in the years from 1862 to 1878 resulted in a clearer separation between the conservatives who later became known as "Old Order Amish" and the progressives who then referred to themselves as "Amish Mennonites".

The Old Order Amish are distinguished from less conservative groups of Amish by their strict adherence to the practice of forbidding automobile ownership and their traditional manner of dress. The Old Order Amish is the concept many outsiders have when they think of "Amish".

In 1990, Old Order Amish settlements existed in 20 states in the United States and in one province in Canada. Membership was estimated at over 80,000 in almost 900 church districts. By 2002, there were over 1,200 districts. According to sociologist Julia Erickson, of Temple University in Philadelphia, Pennsylvania, the Amish are among the fastest-growing populations in the world. Old Order Amish groups include the Byler group, Nebraska Amish in Mifflin County, Pennsylvania, the Reno group, and the Swartzentruber Amish in Holmes County, Ohio.

Old Order Amish subscribe to the Dordrecht Confession of Faith, a Dutch Mennonite Confession of Faith adopted in 1632. Doctrinally they are similar to other Swiss Mennonites but show the influence of the Dutch Mennonites. They practice shunning of excommunicated members, and emphasize that a person can only hope to be saved and that it is a form of pride to claim the assurance of salvation. Feet washing is observed twice annually, in connection with the Communion. Non-resistance, including refusal of military service in any form, is a standard practice.

Almost all Old Order Amish do not build church houses but meet for service in private homes every other Sunday. Because of this, they are sometimes called "House Amish".

In the following, subgroups of Old Order Amish are listed from conservative to progressive:

=== Nebraska Amish ===
The Nebraska Amish are perhaps the most conservative group of Old Order Amish. They live mostly in Pennsylvania but they also have one small settlement in Ohio. Around 1880, Bishop Yost H. Yoder led nine families from Juniata County, Pennsylvania, to Gosper County in south-central Nebraska, founding an Old Order settlement that would last until 1904. Yoder went back to the Kishacoquillas Valley in Pennsylvania in 1881 to assist a conservative Amish group. Because bishop Yoder was living in Nebraska for some time the group was nicknamed the Nebraska Amish by others.

Like other Old Order Amish, the Nebraska Amish do not use motorized equipment or indoor plumbing and wear very conservative clothing. Differences include the fact that the men do not wear suspenders and the women do not wear bonnets (wearing black kerchiefs and flat straw hats instead). Other differences include the fact that they do not place screens on their doors or windows, men only wear white shirts, curtains are not used in homes, buggy tops must be white, men's hair must be shoulder length, no lawn mowers are allowed and houses must not have projecting roofs.

As of 2000, the Nebraska Amish had 14 districts, 775 members, a total population of 1,744 mostly in northeastern Mifflin County, Pennsylvania.

=== Swartzentruber Amish ===
The Swartzentruber Amish are an Old Order Amish group that is about as conservative as the Nebraska Amish but much more numerous and therefore much better known. They formed as the result of a division that occurred among the Amish of Holmes County, Ohio, in 1917. The bishop who broke away was Sam E. Yoder. The Swartzentruber name was applied later, named after bishop Samuel Swartzentruber who succeeded him. There are nineteen districts of Swartzentruber in Holmes County and Wayne County, where the subgroup originated. Now there are groups of Swartzentruber Amish settled in 15 other states, with the largest group in the U.S. located in the Holmes/Wayne County settlement.

Swartzentruber Amish speak Pennsylvania German, and are considered a subgroup of the Old Order Amish, although they do not fellowship or intermarry with more liberal Old Order Amish. Like some other Old Order groups, they avoid the use of electricity and indoor plumbing. Many other common devices and technologies are also disallowed for being too worldly, including buttons, Velcro and bicycles. Swartzentruber farms and yards are often unkempt. The Swartzentrubers discourage interest in outward appearance, as such an interest could promote vanity and pride. Their farms can be identified by dirt drives and surrounding roads, while most roads of the Old Order contain either gravel or paving to keep out the mud. The roofs of the houses and outbuildings are often made of tin. The clothing differs from that of the other Old Order Amish in subtle ways: all colors are dark and somber rather than the bright blues and mauves; more common is navy, dark burgundy, and even gray. The dresses of the women, rather than reaching mid-calf, usually reach to the top of the shoes. The tack on the horses and buggies is often all black, rather than brown leather.

Swartzentruber Amish use reflective tape on the back of their buggies, in place of bright triangular slow moving signs for road travel, which they regard as too worldly. These buggies will also use lanterns, rather than battery-operated lights, or reflectors. The lanterns are also often staggered, one side slightly higher than the other, so as not to appear like the tail lights of a vehicle. There have been several court cases across the country where the state and county challenged the local Swartzentruber group to use the regulation orange triangle. So far, even as far as the federal Supreme Court, the Amish have prevailed, although statistics suggest that in areas where these groups exist, accidents involving buggies are more prevalent.

As of 2000, the Swartzentruber Amish had 64 church districts, 3,165 members, and a total population of 7,101 in 12 states with 33 districts in Ohio alone. As of 2011 the Swartzentruber Amish had 119 church districts in 15 states.

=== Buchanan Amish ===
The Buchanan Amish affiliation was formed in 1914 in Buchanan County, Iowa. It is among the most conservative in the entire Amish world. It is the fourth largest of all Amish affiliation, having almost as many church districts as the Holmes Old Order Amish affiliation. Geographically it is more spread out than any other Amish affiliation.

=== Swiss Amish ===
The Swiss Amish immigrated to the United States mostly in the middle of the 19th century directly from Switzerland and the Alsace and not in the 18th century via the Palatinate as most Amish did. They do not speak Pennsylvania German, but either a form of Bernese German or a Low Alemannic Alsatian dialect. Their main settlements are in Adams County, Indiana (Bernese Amish) and in Allen County, Indiana (Alsatian Amish). They form two distinct Amish affiliations.

The Swiss Amish are more conservative concerning the use of technology than the majority of the Amish. Characteristic of the Swiss Amish is the use of open buggies only and the marking of graves with plain wooden stakes bearing only the initials of the deceased. The Swiss Amish are notable for their yodeling which they took from their Swiss homeland. Yodeling is an important symbol of their particular Swiss Amish identity.

=== Andy Weaver Amish ===
In Holmes County, Ohio, the Andy Weaver Amish were formed in 1952 over the issue of shunning. They are less conservative than the Swartzentruber Amish but more conservative than the Old Order main body. Compared to them they have greater restrictions on farm, business and home technologies, a stricter interpretation of shunning, stricter youth regulations and a greater tolerance of alcohol and tobacco.

There are about 30 Andy Weaver districts in the Holmes County settlement and some more outside of Holmes County, including settlements in Ashland County, Ohio, and in upstate New York.

=== Troyer Amish ===
In 1932 bishop Eli A. Troyer withdrew from the Swartzentruber Amish and began the Troyer church in Wayne County, Ohio. He did this over several issues, one of which was hat brims.

Swartzentruber wore hats the same as the rest of the Amish up to this time. Up to 1942 free moving from one sect to another was also allowed without penalty in the Troyer Church.

The Troyer church eventually moved to numerous locations in Pennsylvania, New York, Michigan and Canada as did the Swartzentruber Church.

As of 2011 the Troyer Amish had 53 church districts in 6 states.

=== Byler Amish ===
The Byler Amish were formed in 1849 in Mifflin County, Pennsylvania. Byler Amish buggies have yellow tops in contrast to normally black (Ohio, Indiana), gray (Pennsylvania) or brown tops. As of 2000, the Byler had three churches in Mifflin County and are also affiliated with districts near New Wilmington, Pennsylvania.

=== Renno Amish ===
The Renno or Peachey Amish, also called "black toppers", because they have buggies with black top, were formed in 1863 in Mifflin County, Pennsylvania. Their Ordnung allows men to wear only one suspender, while women wear black bonnets. As of 2000, the Renno Amish had about a dozen church districts primarily in Pennsylvania.

=== Holmes Old Order ===
The Holmes Old Order Amish affiliation is third in numbers of adherents of all Amish affiliation. It is almost only present at the Holmes-Wayne Amish settlement in Ohio. With 140 church districts there in 2009, it is the main and dominant Amish affiliation there, even though there were 61 another church districts of 10 other affiliations in the settlement.

=== Elkhart-LaGrange ===
The Elkhart-LaGrange Amish affiliation is the second largest Old Order Amish affiliation. Its origin and main settlement lies in Elkhart and LaGrange counties in Indiana. It is quite liberal compared to other Amish affiliations concerning the use of technology. Regulations of the Ordnung may vary considerably from district to neighboring district. It was present in 3 states in 9 settlements with 177 church districts in 2011.

=== Lancaster Amish ===
The Lancaster Amish affiliation is the largest affiliation among the Old Order Amish. Its origin and largest settlement is Lancaster County in Pennsylvania. The settlement in Lancaster County, founded in 1760, is the oldest Amish settlement that is still in existence.

Even though the Lancaster affiliation is quite liberal concerning the use of technology, compared to other Amish affiliations, it is an affiliation that practices strenge Meidung (strict shunning). Lancaster affiliation buggies have gray tops.

Lancaster affiliation had 141 church districts in 1991 and 286 in 2010. In 2011 it was present in 8 states in 37 settlements with 291 church districts. It represents about 15 percent of the Old Order Amish population, that is about 45,000 out of about 300,000 in 2015.

=== Tobe Amish ===
The Tobe Amish, or Tobe church, was a splinter group from the Troyer Amish, formed in the 1940s. Eventually, they returned to the main Old Order body, but retaining some distinctive pattern of dress and buggy style.

In the spring of 1942, Troyer bishop, Abe Troyer moved to close the door between sects by excommunicating those who joined another sect of Amish outside of the fellowship and when the dust settled, the excommunicated families, led by Tobe Hochstetler, were called the Tobe church. The Tobe church remained mainly in Wayne County, although they split into Old Order Tobe and New Order Tobe.

=== Michigan Amish Churches ===
The Michigan Amish Churches or Michigan related Amish are an affiliation of Old Order Amish, that emerged in 1970 in Michigan. This affiliation is more evangelical and more open to outsiders, so-called seekers, than other Old Order Amish affiliations.

== New Order Amish ==
The New Order Amish are a subgroup of Amish which is close to the Old Order Amish. New Order Amish split from the Old Order Amish in the 1960s for a variety of reasons, which included a desire for "clean" youth courting standards, meaning they do not condone tobacco, alcohol, or the practice of bundling, or non-sexually lying in bed together, during courtship. They also wished to incorporate more evangelical elements into the church, including Sunday school and mission work.

In 1966, around one hundred families split with the Old Order Amish in Lancaster County, Pennsylvania, and created two new congregations, and have since taken on the name "New Order Amish." A separate movement developed in Ohio at around the same time.

Like Old Order groups, New Order Amish drive horses for transportation, wear plain clothing, speak the Pennsylvania German dialect, and practice home worship. As with other Amish, technological restrictions include prohibitions on the internet, television, and radio. Some New Order Amish allow electricity around the home, and some groups permit telephones in the home as well. New Order Amish may be more lenient in the practice of shunning and may be more permissive of photography than lower-order groups. New Order Amish prohibit alcohol and tobacco use (seen in some Old Order groups), an important factor in the original division.

There are several different fellowships which are referred to as being "New Order." New Order Amish communities can be found in around a dozen states, with the largest population in the Holmes County, Ohio settlement.

== Beachy Amish Mennonite ==
Even though called "Amish", the Beachy Amish lack several typical features associated with the Amish, like horse-drawn transportation, the worship in private homes and the preservation of the German language (with exception of Old Beachy Amish). They can be grouped with the Amish Mennonites, with which they share many features.

The Beachy Amish Mennonite constituency is a loose association of Anabaptist churches without a central governing body. Because of the loose structure, few common characteristics are shared by all Beachy congregations. Some similarities include adhering to the Dordrecht Confession of Faith and practicing varying degrees of Anabaptist practice, such as nonresistance, separation from the state, and adult baptism.

=== History ===
The Beachy church arose from a 1927 division in the (Casselman) River Old Order Amish congregation in Somerset County, Pennsylvania. Bishop Moses M. Beachy led the congregation during that time and his name became associated with the faction. The Beachys favored a milder discipline for members whose only offense was transferring membership to other Anabaptist churches, specifically the conservative Amish Mennonite congregation that broke from Moses Beachy's congregation (then not under Beachy's leadership) in 1895.

=== Distinctives ===
In contrast to the Old Order Amish, the Beachys have meetinghouses, Sunday School, and a Bible School for young adults, and most also support missionary work. Excommunication is used less frequently and accompanying bans are even rarer.

Most Beachy churches today more closely resemble the Conservative Mennonites rather than the Old Order Amish. The practices and lifestyle still similar to the Old Order Amish include:

- Women wear head covering
- Married men have beards in most congregations
- Television and radio are forbidden

Practices that distinguish the Beachy church from the Old Order Amish include:

- Filtered Internet is permitted by most congregations
- Men wear ready-made clothing
- Ownership of personal automobiles.
- Most do not speak Pennsylvania Dutch.

=== Population and distribution ===
In 2006, there were 11,487 Beachy members in 207 churches, with the highest representation in Pennsylvania, Indiana and Ohio. International Beachy churches or mission work can be found in El Salvador, Belize, Nicaragua, Costa Rica, Paraguay, Ireland, Ukraine, Romania, Kenya, Australia, and Canada. Mission work is sponsored by Amish Mennonite Aid (AMA), Mennonite Interests Committee (MIC), or individual churches.

== Amish Mennonites ==
The Amish Mennonites came into existence through reform movements among North-American Amish mainly between 1862 and 1878. These Amish moved away from the old Amish traditions and drew near to the Mennonites to become Mennonites of Amish origin. Over the decades all Amish Mennonites groups removed the word "Amish" from the name of their congregations or merged with Mennonite groups except the Kauffman Amish Mennonites, see below.

=== Kauffman Amish Mennonite ===
The Kauffman Amish, also called Sleeping Preacher Churches or Tampico Amish Mennonite Churches, are a Plain, car-driving branch of the Amish Mennonites whose tradition goes back to John D. Kauffman (1847–1913) who preached while being in a state of trance and who was seen as a "sleeping preacher". In 2017 the Kauffman Amish Mennonites had some 2,000 baptized members and lived mainly in Missouri and Arkansas. In contrast to other Amish Mennonites, they have retained their identity over the last hundred years and also largely the Pennsylvania German language and other Amish Mennonite traditions from the late 1800s.

=== Amish Mennonite subgroups outside the Amish Mennonite mainstream ===
Two Amish Mennonite were organized outside the Amish Mennonite mainstream:

- The Egli Amish
- The Stuckey Amish

Both groups, like the rest of the Amish Mennonites, eventually merged with the Mennonite mainstream.

== Para-Amish groups ==
G. C. Waldrep describes several groups he calls "para-Amish". These are groups that share many characteristics with the Amish, like driving horses for transportation, and plain dress. Even though the members of these groups are largely of Amish origin, they are not in fellowship with other Amish groups, because they adhere to theological doctrines like assurance of salvation or practices like community of goods that are normally not accepted among mainstream Amish. These groups are composed of members from different backgrounds, mostly Amish, Old Order Mennonite, Old German Baptist as well as people from non-plain churches, so-called seekers.

The following are groups (past and present) described as "para-Amish" by Waldrep:

- Believers in Christ, Lobelville (since 1973)
- Plain Community in Le Roy, Michigan (1981 -1995/98)
- Plain Community in Manton, Michigan (~1985–1995)
- Plain Community in Ghent, Kentucky (1985–1995)
- The Christian Communities of Elmo Stoll headquartered in Cookeville, Tennessee plus four daughter settlements (1990–2001)
- Vernon Community, Hestand (since 1996)
- Caneyville Christian Community (2005–2021)

Waldrep describes a pattern across these movements that when families that made up a group dispersed, they typically rejoined the Amish, the Charity Movement, other assimilated Anabaptist churches, or one of the other para-Amish groups.

== See also ==
- Plain people
- Amish buggy

== Literature ==
- Donald B. Kraybill, Karen M. Johnson-Weiner and Steven M. Nolt: The Amish, Johns Hopkins University Press, Baltimore, MD, 2013.
- Steven Nolt: A History of the Amish, Intercourse, PA, 1992.
- Karen Johnson-Weiner: New York Amish: Life in the Plain Communities of the Empire State, Cornell University Press, Ithaca, NY, 2010.
- Charles Hurst and David McConnell: An Amish Paradox. Diversity and Change in the World's Largest Amish Community, Johns Hopkins University Press, Baltimore, MD, 2010.
