= Kalona, Iowa =

- City
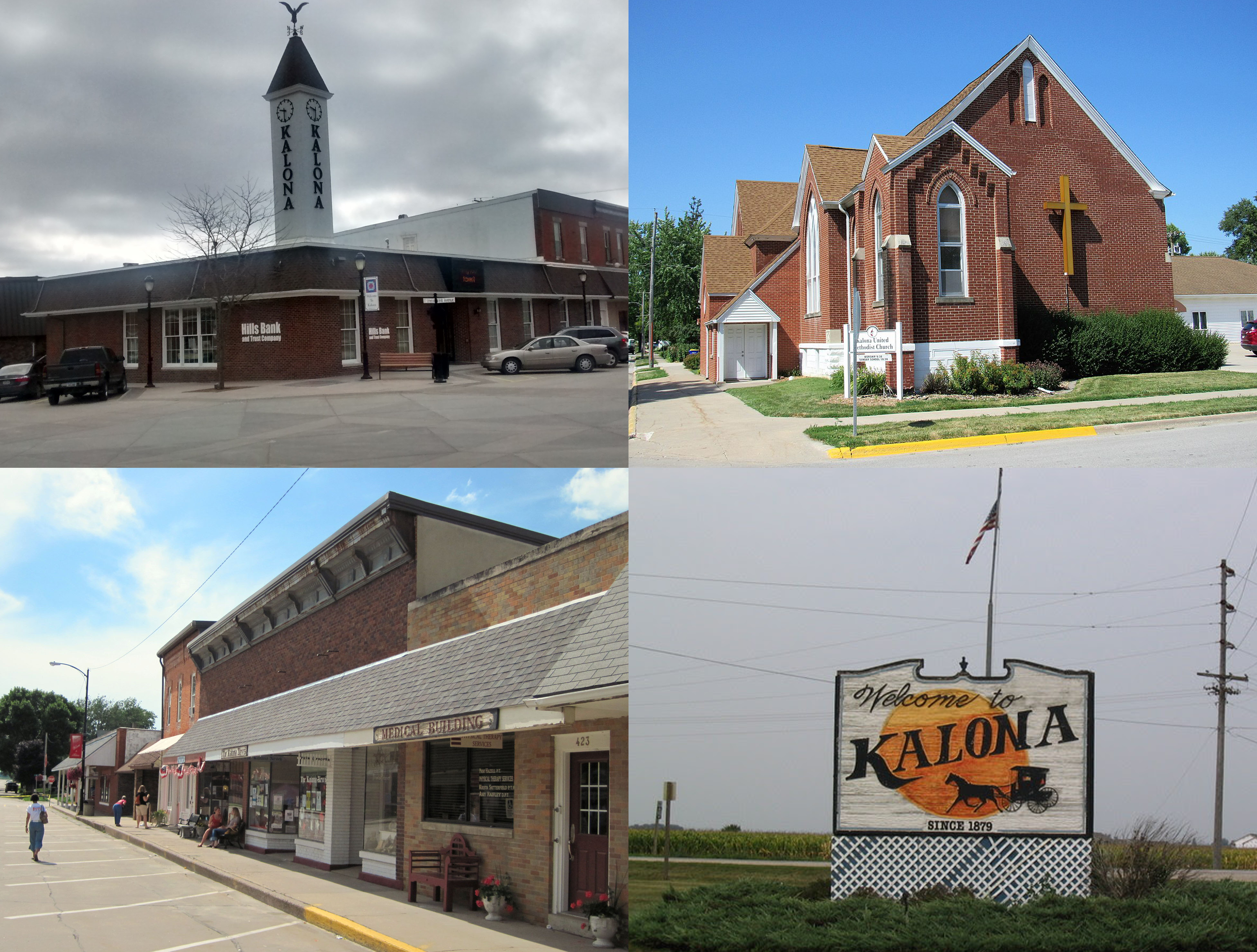
- Left column: Downtown Kalona; Right column: Kalona United Methodist Church, Kalona Welcome Sign
- Nickname: Quilt Capitol of Iowa
- Location of Kalona, Iowa
- Coordinates: 41°29′15″N 91°42′07″W
- Country: United States
- State: Iowa
- County: Washington

Government
  - Mayor: Mark Robe

Area
  - Total: 2.15 sq mi (5.57 km^{2})
  - Land: 2.15 sq mi (5.57 km^{2})
  - Water: 0 sq mi (0.00 km^{2})
- Elevation: 666 ft (203 m)

Population (2020)
  - Total: 2,630
  - Density: 1,220.5/sq mi (471.24/km^{2})
- Time zone: UTC-6 (Central (CST))
  - Summer (DST): UTC-5 (CDT)
- ZIP code: 52247
- Area code: 319
- FIPS code: 19-40170
- GNIS feature ID: 2395485
- Website: www.cityofkalona.org

Kalona is a city in Washington County, Iowa. It is part of the Iowa City metropolitan area. The population was 2,630 at the time of the 2020 census. Kalona is the second-largest city in Washington County.

== History ==
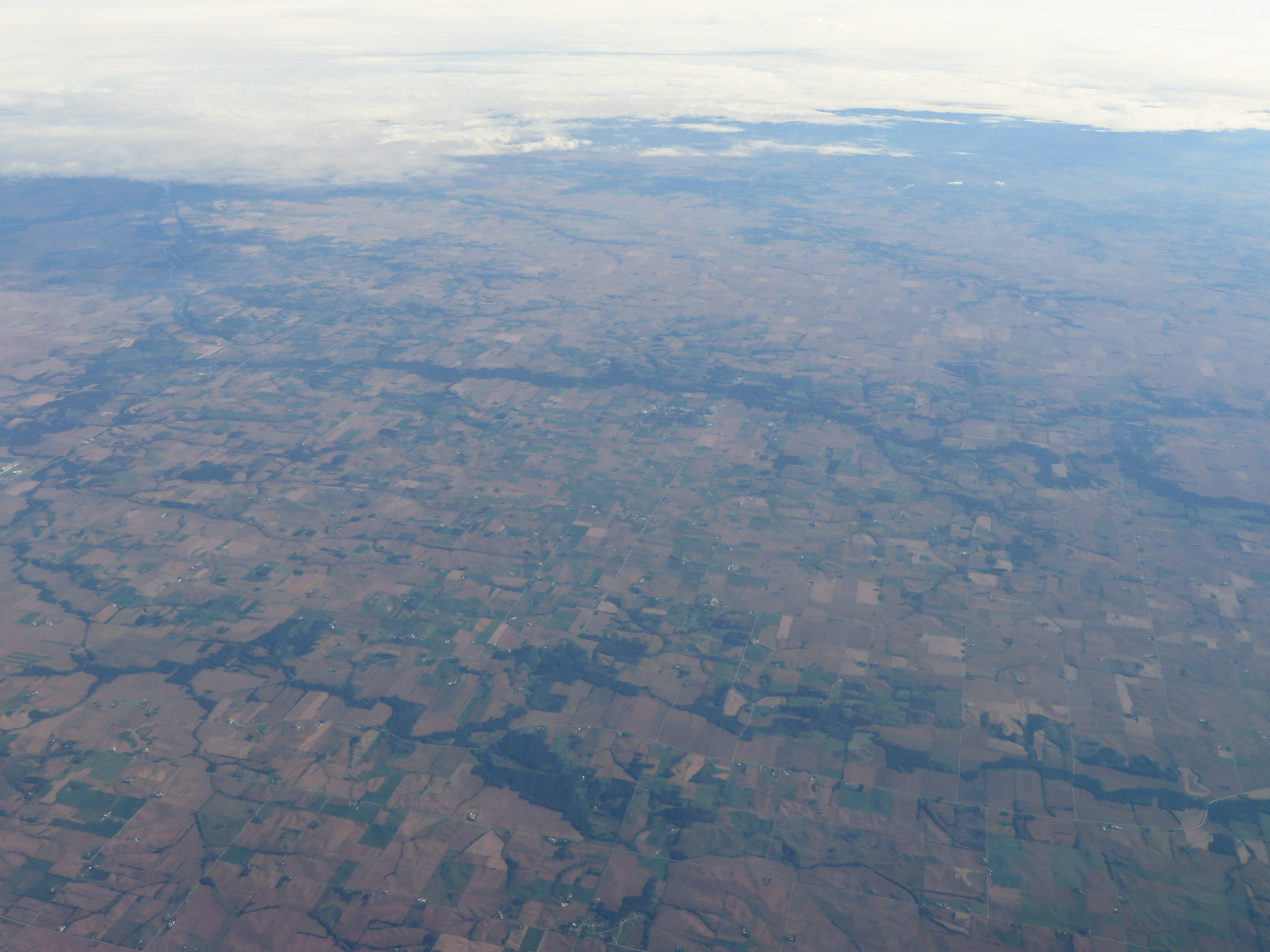
Aerial view of Kalona and the surrounding area

Amish settlement in what is now the Kalona area began in the 1840s, placing the Amish among the first European settlers in the area. The split between Old Order Amish and Amish Mennonites occurred in the 1860s in most places, but it was not until the 1880s that the formal split occurred in Iowa, even though a process of sorting out between conservatives and change-minded Amish had begun a decade earlier or so in Iowa. Most Amish Mennonites later assimilated and lost their Amish identity. The Beachy Amish broke away from the Old Orders in the 1920s.

The Burlington, Cedar Rapids and Northern Railway built a 66-mile branch from Iowa City to What Cheer via Kalona in 1879.

Kalona was established by the railroad on August 6, 1879. The name was suggested to the railroad by a Mr. Myers, who owned a bull of that name. The town remained unincorporated until 1890.

== Geography ==
According to the United States Census Bureau, the city has a total area of 2.15 square miles (5.57 km^{2}), all of it land.

== Demographics ==
Historical populations
Year	Pop.	±%
1890	211	—
1900	530	+151.2%
1910	466	−12.1%
1920	632	+35.6%
1930	704	+11.4%
1940	765	+8.7%
1950	947	+23.8%
1960	1,235	+30.4%
1970	1,488	+20.5%
1980	1,862	+25.1%
1990	1,942	+4.3%
2000	2,293	+18.1%
2010	2,363	+3.1%
2020	2,630	+11.3%
Source:"U.S. Census website". United States Census Bureau. and Iowa Data Center; Source: U.S. Decennial Census

=== 2020 census ===
As of the 2020 census, Kalona had a population of 2,630, with 1,110 households and 680 families. The population density was 1,220.5 inhabitants per square mile (471.2/km^{2}). There were 1,155 housing units at an average density of 536.0 per square mile (207.0/km^{2}); 3.9% of housing units were vacant.

Of the 1,110 households, 26.7% had children under the age of 18 living in them. Of all households, 50.1% were married-couple households, 5.7% were cohabiting-couple households, 16.7% were households with a male householder and no spouse or partner present, and 27.6% were households with a female householder and no spouse or partner present. About 38.7% of all households were non-families, 34.6% were made up of individuals, and 18.0% had someone living alone who was 65 years of age or older.

The median age was 43.2 years. 25.4% of residents were under the age of 20; 4.1% were between the ages of 20 and 24; 23.2% were from 25 to 44; 22.5% were from 45 to 64; and 24.8% were 65 years of age or older. In total, 22.9% of residents were under the age of 18. The gender makeup of the city was 47.6% male and 52.4% female. For every 100 females there were 90.9 males, and for every 100 females age 18 and over there were 87.8 males age 18 and over.

0.0% of residents lived in urban areas, while 100.0% lived in rural areas.

Racial composition as of the 2020 census
Race	Number	Percent
White	2,424	92.2%
Black or African American	27	1.0%
American Indian and Alaska Native	5	0.2%
Asian	9	0.3%
Native Hawaiian and Other Pacific Islander	0	0.0%
Some other race	53	2.0%
Two or more races	112	4.3%
Hispanic or Latino (of any race)	138	5.2%

=== 2010 census ===
As of the census of 2010, there were 2,363 people, 1,053 households, and 657 families living in the city. The population density was 1,158.3 inhabitants per square mile (447.2/km^{2}). There were 1,141 housing units at an average density of 559.3 units per square mile (215.9 units/km^{2}). The racial makeup of the city was 97.2% White, 0.4% African American, 0.3% Native American, 0.2% Asian, 1.1% from other races, and 0.9% from two or more races. Hispanic or Latino of any race were 2.0% of the population.

There were 1,053 households, of which 26.4% had children under the age of 18 living with them, 50.1% were married couples living together, 9.5% had a female householder with no husband present, 2.8% had a male householder with no wife present, and 37.6% were non-families. 33.9% of all households were made up of individuals, and 18.4% had someone living alone who was 65 years of age or older. The average household size was 2.20 and the average family size was 2.82.

The median age in the city was 45.7 years. 21.9% of residents were under the age of 18; 5.6% were between the ages of 18 and 24; 21.5% were from 25 to 44; 28.2% were from 45 to 64; and 23% were 65 years of age or older. The gender makeup of the city was 45.5% male and 54.5% female.

=== 2000 census ===
As of the census of 2000, there were 2,293 people, 947 households, and 597 families living in the city. The population density was 1,119.9 inhabitants per square mile (432.4/km^{2}). There were 986 housing units at an average density of 481.6 units per square mile (185.9 units/km^{2}). The racial makeup of the city was 98.08% White, 0.22% African American, 0.48% Native American, 0.39% Asian, 0.04% Pacific Islander, 0.26% from other races, and 0.52% from two or more races. Hispanic or Latino of any race were 1.09% of the population.

There were 947 households, out of which 27.2% had children under the age of 18 living with them, 55.5% were married couples living together, 6.3% had a female householder with no husband present, and 36.9% were non-families. 33.4% of all households were made up of individuals, and 16.2% had someone living alone who was 65 years of age or older. The average household size was 2.32 and the average family size was 3.00.

In the city, the population was spread out, with 23.5% under the age of 18, 7.2% from 18 to 24, 24.4% from 25 to 44, 21.1% from 45 to 64, and 23.8% who were 65 years of age or older. The median age was 41 years. For every 100 females, there were 80.7 males. For every 100 females age 18 and over, there were 74.7 males.

The median income for a household in the city was $33,750, and the median income for a family was $45,897. Males had a median income of $30,776 versus $24,974 for females. The per capita income for the city was $22,474. About 5.0% of families and 6.7% of the population were below the poverty line, including 7.6% of those under age 18 and 6.2% of those age 65 or over.

== Culture ==
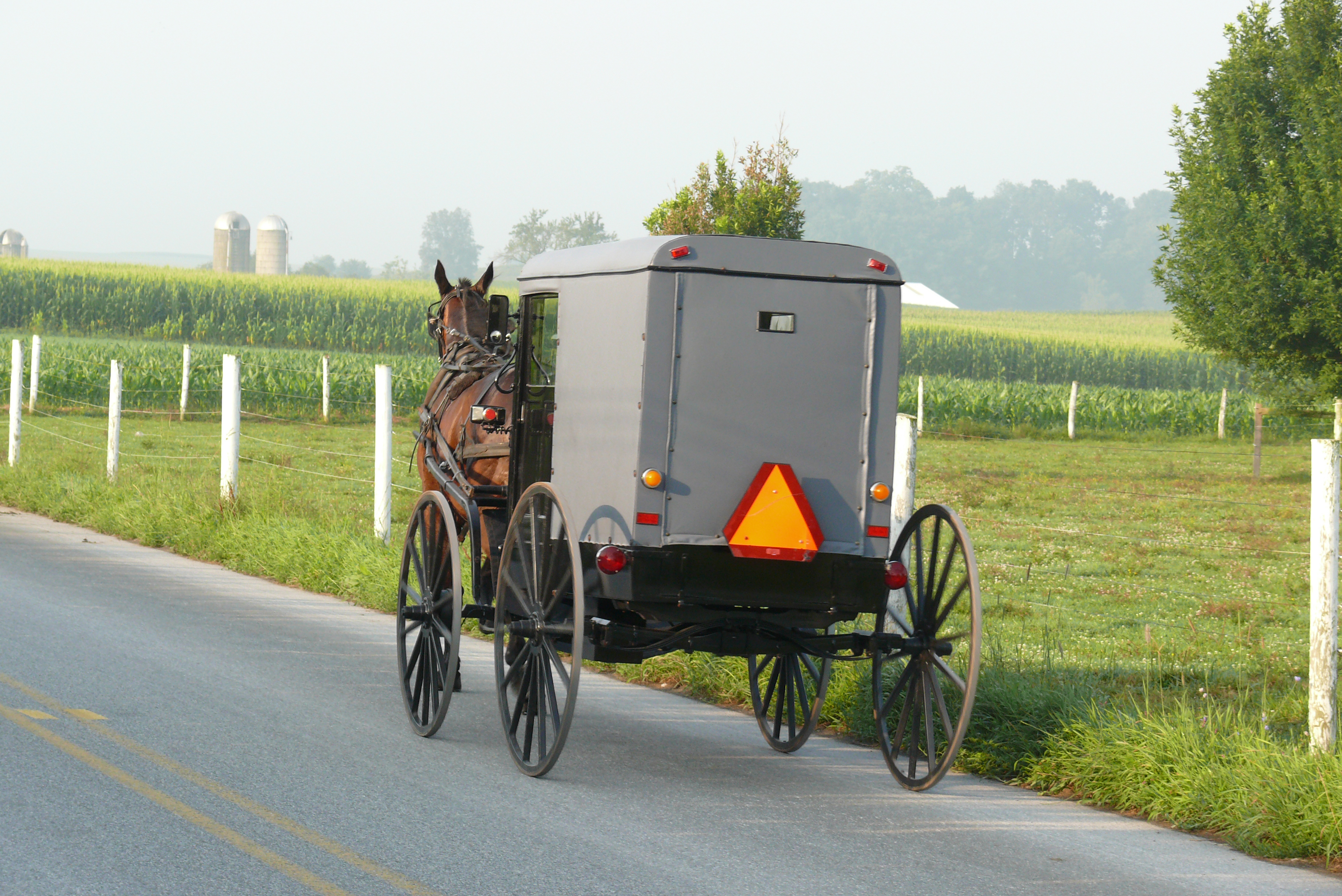
An Amish buggy with a slow moving vehicle triangle on the back

Not far from Kalona is located one of the largest Amish settlements west of the Mississippi with eleven church districts and a population of roughly 1,200 people. It is the oldest in Iowa, founded in 1846. The Kalona New Order Amish affiliation is one of the most liberal concerning the use of technology and allows tractors for field work. Kalona is the home of the Iowa Mennonite Archives, located at the Kalona Historical Village. Noah Troyer (1831–1886), one of two sleeping preachers among the Amish Mennonites, lived three miles north of Kalona.

== Education ==
The Mid-Prairie Community School District operates local area public schools.
