= Swiss Amish =

American groups originally from Switzerland

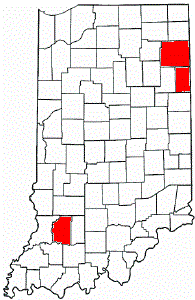
Swiss Amish counties in Indiana: Adams, Allen, and Daviess

The Swiss Amish (Swiss German: Schwyzer Amisch) are a subgroup of the Amish that emigrated to the United States mostly in the middle of the 19th century directly from Switzerland and Alsace, after the 18th-century emigration of most Amish via the Palatinate. They do not speak Pennsylvania German, but either a form of Bernese German or a Low Alemannic Alsatian dialect. Their main settlements are in Adams County, Indiana (Bernese Amish) and in Allen County, Indiana (Alsatian Amish). They form two distinct Amish affiliations.

== History ==
Amish coming directly from Switzerland, neighboring Alsace and the Montbéliard region, first came to the Midwest in the 1830s. Originally these Amish came from Bern and the French-speaking region of the Jura Mountains, where two villages, Mont-Tramelan and Rebévelier, had been settled by German-speaking Mennonites (who partly became Amish after the Amish-Mennonite division) in the early 17th century, thus forming German-speaking language islands there.

In 1835 they migrated to Wayne County, Ohio, but in 1840 they went west and founded the settlement in Adams County, Indiana. In 1850 Amish from the Montbéliard region first settled in Stark County, Ohio, but then founded the settlement in Allen County, Indiana, in 1852. Not all Swiss Amish migrations can be traced. The Amish settlement in Daviess County, Indiana, founded in 1868, was settled largely by Swiss Amish from Allen County, but later was mostly assimilated into the Pennsylvania German Amish culture. There are still speakers of the Alsatian dialect in Daviess County, however.

== Culture and tradition ==
=== Use of technology ===
The Swiss Amish are more conservative concerning the use of technology than the majority of the Amish. Characteristic for the Swiss Amish is the use of open buggies only and the marking of graves with plain wooden stakes bearing only the initials of the deceased.

=== Language ===
Most speakers of the Alsatian dialect also speak or at least understand Pennsylvania German.

=== Yodeling ===
The Swiss Amish of Adams County and to a lesser extent the ones of Allen County maintain the practice of yodeling from their Swiss homeland. According to Chad Thompson, almost every Amish of Adams County can yodel. Yodeling is an important symbol of their particular Swiss Amish identity. Examples of Swiss Amish yodeling can be heard online.

=== Names ===
There are certain last names which are very common among the Swiss Amish and which are not found often elsewhere. These names include: Schwartz, Hilty, Lengacher, Graber, Wittmer, Shetler, Christner, Eicher, Girod, Wengerd and Wickey.

== Population and church districts ==
The estimated population of the Swiss Amish was 1,900 in 1960 and 21,195 in 2015.

As of 2011 the two affiliations of the Swiss Amish had together 152 of the 1,913 Amish church districts, accounting for about seven to eight percent of all Amish. Most Swiss Amish are located in Indiana, but there are Swiss Amish settlements in other states, most notably in Michigan, New York, Missouri and Ohio.

The largest Swiss Amish settlement is located in Adams County, Indiana, near Berne, with a total Amish population of 8,595 people in 2017. The Amish settlement in Daviess County, Indiana, with a total Amish population of 4,855 people in 2017, was originally settled mostly by Swiss Amish but switched to Pennsylvania German language over time.

A large Swiss Amish settlement was founded in 1968 near Seymour, Missouri. It consisted of 16 church districts in 2017 and a total Amish population of about 2,665 people.
