= Groffdale Conference Mennonite Church =

Christian denomination

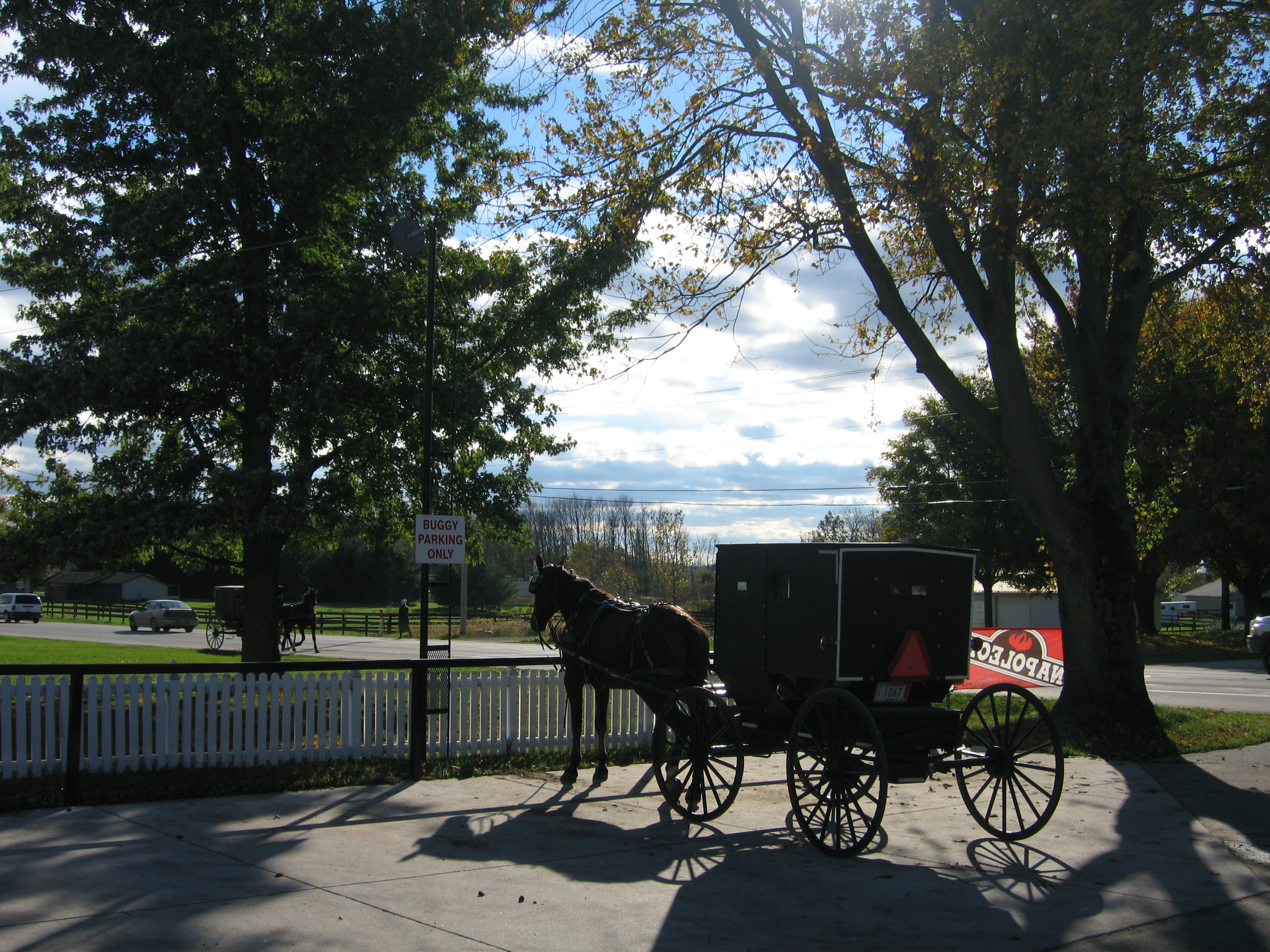
Horse-drawn buggy painted in the Mennonite style, such as the Groffdale Church would use

The Groffdale Conference Mennonite Church, also called Wenger Mennonites, is the largest Old Order Mennonite group to use horse-drawn carriages for transportation. Along with the automobile, they reject many modern conveniences, while allowing electricity in their homes and steel-wheeled tractors to till the fields. Initially concentrated in eastern Lancaster County, Pennsylvania, their numbers had grown to 22,305 people resided in eight other states as of 2015. They share the pulpit with the Ontario (Old Order) Mennonite Conference but have some differences in Ordnung.

== History ==
The Groffdale Conference Mennonites have their roots in the Anabaptist movement of Switzerland and Southwest Germany, including the German-speaking Alsace, that came under French rule starting in the 17th century. In the first two centuries or so this movement was known by the name Swiss Brethren but later adopted the name Mennonite.

=== Anabaptist beginnings ===
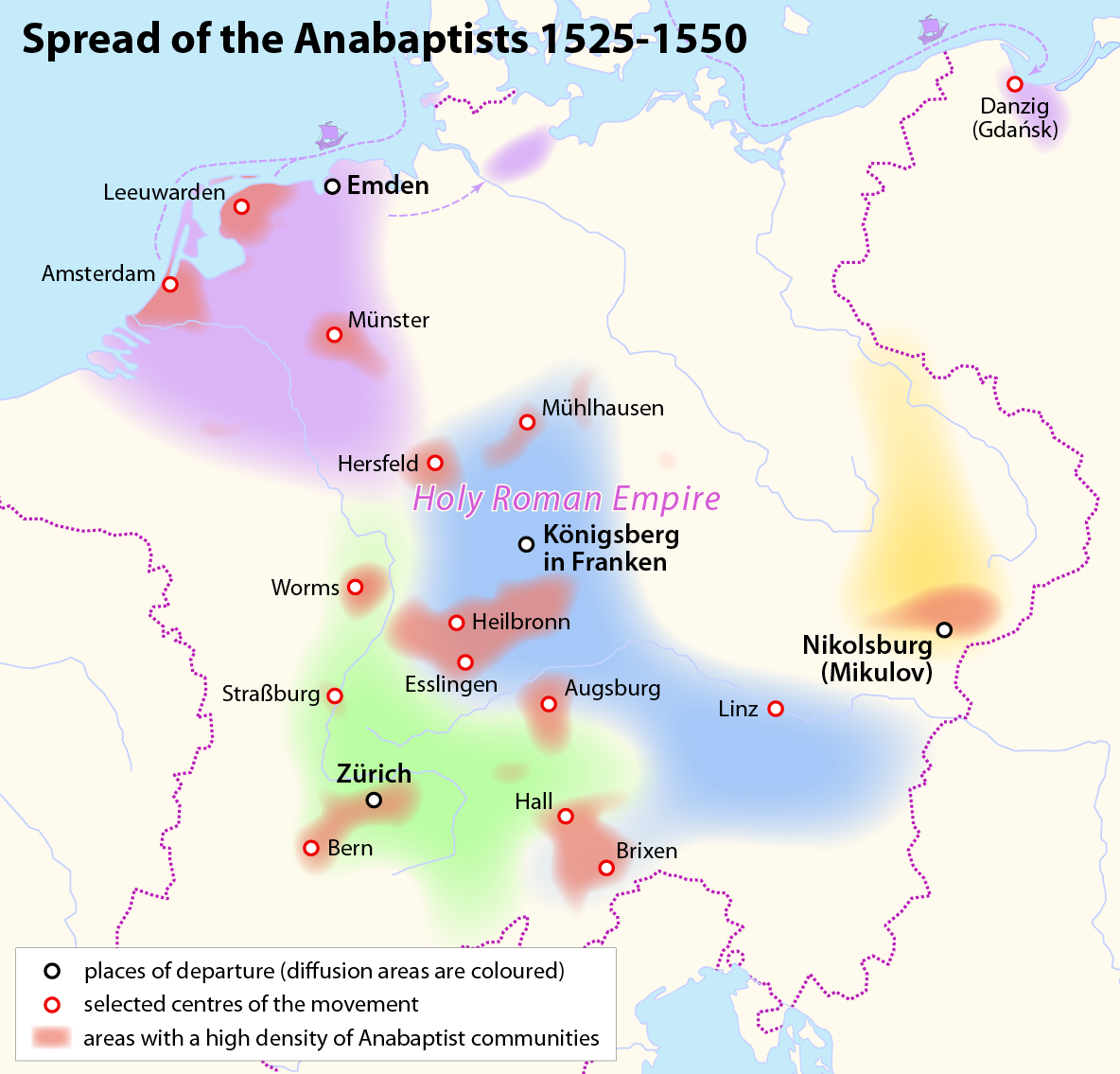
Spread of the early Anabaptists, 1525–1550

The early history of the Mennonites starts with the Anabaptists in the German and Dutch-speaking parts of central Europe. These forerunners of modern Mennonites were part of the Protestant Reformation, a broad reaction against the practices and theology of the Roman Catholic Church. Its most distinguishing feature is the rejection of infant baptism, an act that had both religious and political meaning since almost every infant born in western Europe was baptized into the Roman Catholic Church. Other significant theological views of the Mennonites developed in opposition to Roman Catholic views or to the views of other Protestant reformers such as Martin Luther and Huldrych Zwingli.

Some of the followers of Zwingli's Reformed church thought that requiring church membership beginning at birth was inconsistent with the New Testament. They believed that the church should be completely removed from government (the proto–free church tradition), and that individuals should join only when willing to publicly acknowledge belief in Jesus and the desire to live in accordance with his teachings. At a small meeting in Zurich on January 21, 1525, Conrad Grebel, Felix Manz, and George Blaurock, along with twelve others, baptized each other.

Despite strong repressive efforts of the state churches, the movement spread slowly around western Europe, primarily along the Rhine. Officials killed many of the earliest Anabaptist leaders in an attempt to purge Europe of the new sect.

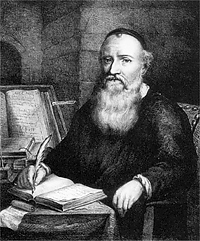
Menno Simons

In the early days of the Anabaptist movement, Menno Simons, a Catholic priest in the Low Countries, heard of the movement and started to rethink his Catholic faith. In 1536, at the age of 40, Simons left the Roman Catholic Church. He soon became a leader within the Anabaptist movement, and was wanted by authorities for the rest of his life. His name became associated with scattered groups of nonviolent Anabaptists whom he helped to organize and consolidate.

=== Migration to North America ===
In the 18th century, about 100,000 Germans mainly from the Palatinate emigrated to Pennsylvania, where they became known collectively as the Pennsylvania Dutch. Of these immigrants, around 2,500 were Mennonites and 500 were Amish. These two groups settled mainly in southeast Pennsylvania, many of them in the Lancaster and adjacent counties.

During the Colonial period, Mennonites were distinguished from other Pennsylvania Germans in three ways: their opposition to the American Revolutionary War, in which other German settlers participated on both sides; resistance to public education; and disapproval of religious revivalism. Contributions of Mennonites during this period include the idea of separation of church and state, and opposition to slavery.

From 1812 to 1860, another wave of Mennonite immigrants from Europe settled farther west in Ohio, Indiana, Illinois and Missouri. These Mennonites, along with another wave of Amish, came from Switzerland, Southwest Germany and the Alsace-Lorraine area.

=== Old Order Movement ===
The Groffdale Conference has its roots in the Old Order divisions, that occurred in Indiana in 1872, and in Lancaster County, Pennsylvania, in 1893, over the question of English language preaching, Sunday Schools and other questions. The trigger for the split in Lancaster County was a quarrel about a pulpit that was to be installed in church instead of the traditional preacher's table.

The modernizing trends that changed the form of religious practice were pushed among the Mennonites especially by two men: John F. Funk and John S. Coffman. The Groffdale Conference Mennonites still call modernized Mennonites Funkeleit, that is Funk people. The traditional minded people left the old conferences to form new ones, not the modernizers.

=== The emergence of the Groffdale Conference ===
The Groffdale Conference arose in 1927 at the conclusion of a seventeen-year disagreement within the Weaverland Old Order Mennonite Conference, over use of the automobile. Five hundred of the more traditional members of the Weaverland conference, about half of the congregation, formed this group in order to retain horse-drawn transportation. The name of the conference comes from the Groffdale churchhouse where Joseph O. Wenger led the first worship services.

=== Further history ===
The John W. Martin Mennonites, a group of Old Order Mennonites from Indiana, merged with the Groffdale Conference in 1973.

In 1974 a new settlement in Yates County, New York, was started. It grew quickly and steadily and with a population of more than 3,000 in 2015 it was almost as large as the Lancaster County settlement.

The Wenger Mennonites ("Joe Wengers", "Wengerleit", "Fuhre Mennischte") or Groffdale Conference Mennonites experienced several smaller splits during their history:

- 1942: Dozens of members refrained from communion because of the Civilian Public Service (CPS) issue, later several more conservative Old Order groups were founded or joined by these people: directly founded: Reidenbach Mennonites, joined: Phares Stauffer Pike Mennonites, then the new formed Aaron Martin Pike Mennonites and further groups in Snyder County, Pennsylvania.
- 1991-93s: For some decades it was a sign of humility and part of the Ordnung, that the ministry has no electricity and phone, or got rid of it when ordained. Having it at neighbors' farm sites and in neighbors´ stables was however acceptable.

People in the lot (for ordinations) had to accept it, otherwise they would be taken out before election. In 1991 a new ordained one refused to deinstall electricity and phone, supported by Bishop Aaron Sensenig. Deacon John Martin demanded expulsion, without success. Finally it was also allowed for the ministry, a fraction broke away and formed under John Martin (former deacon) a new group, in Missouri its leader was Noah W. Leid. The John Martin (Groffdale Conference) Mennonites (for a short time), better known as Leid Church or "Old Order Wenger Church" never grew to big numbers, mostly associated with Missouri and Kentucky. John Martin came from Lancaster County but had no strong support there. This group still exists and had 77 members in the 2010s. Congregations exist at Clearview Old Order Mennonite meeting house, Versailles, MO (shared) and Miller Valley meeting house in Kentucky (alone). In 2021 a one of their bishops joined the Mid-West Conference according to "Die Botschaft", a newspaper for an Old Order audience from Sugarcreek, Ohio.

- 1990s: The rubber belt/steel wheel issue almost created a split in the 1990s. Rubber tires on tractors are forbidden since the later 1930s when the first tractors replaced communal horse power. It is said that Joe Wenger saw people using tractors like cars and then the prohibition had to be discussed, the agreement was to forbid pneumatic tires on tractors to prevent being used like cars, oftentimes with the same speed. Over the time people created a rubber belt which was put under the steel and helped on driving a tractor on streets without destroying so much of the road. The rubber belt split could be prevented, but the issues of steel wheel tractors being used on public roads is still oftentimes a conflicting issue (because of their scratching results on pavement), especially in Western states (see Mitchell County vs. Zimmerman, where the material for roads was changed and less resistant against steel wheels of Wenger Mennonites tractors).
- 2000s: Jacob Oberholtzer was a minister, who for decades tried to establish a functioning tractor-forbidding subgroup among the Wenger Mennonites, therefore moving from county to county, as the issue could hardly be hold, when tractor using families moved into settlements under his control. While in this point ultra conservative, he was more open minded to replace Pennsylvania Dutch and German as official church languages with English, so having another understanding of culture and religion, officially helping converts. Jacob Oberholtzer during his life time moved from Pennsylvania (here moving from one county to another) finally to Kentucky, and after becoming finally bishop in Casey County, Kentucky split off from the Groffdale Conference. This group is currently located close to Spencer, Tennessee, after moving away from Casey County, its location before. Several times Jacob Oberholtzer´s approach created problems due to the enforcement attempts to forbid tractors and a stricter enforcement of material ruling and due to the attempts replacing German by English in obviously steps without consent of the congregation.

All these former splits were smaller ones. The numbers go into the tens, instead of hundreds.

In spring 2018 a big split happened.

- 2018: The split resulted from the computer issue in spring 2018, but especially the conference structure of the church or more rights for the denominations in their settlements for variations also played an important role in it. The nationwide binding of rules was more and more requested, therefore the growing centralizing tendencies and forced upon policies were the critical points. The conference had decided to establish a computer ruling which favored a certain type of computer type. Just one producer was according to one source allowed to rebuild and sell them within their ranks. Other producers were forbidden to build them anymore (according to https://splash4ripples.com/tag/groffdale-conference...), while it is also reported these ones didn´t want it anymore because it would have to be a non-profit company.

This split affected Missouri, Kentucky, New York and Indiana, (and Iowa to a very small part) where bishops, preachers and deacons left the Wenger Mennonites with a big amount of laity, but still (a sometimes high-numbered) minority locally, They formed a loosely connected Midwest Conference according to their Directory it is named "Midwest Conference Mennonite", according to other sources like obituaries it is called "Old Order Midwest Mennonite Conference".

In 2016 already some problems were made public when a bishop of Missouri added some pages to the annual printing of Calendars and later this edition had to be destroyed and a second printing was distributed to the laity (of course without these pages). He mentioned therein rulings which should be established in the next years, conservative rulings. Written by bishop Raymond Shirk, he later joined the Midwest side and organized it in his area.

The split resulted in about 10% (exactly 9.6 %) of the members leaving (current numbers: abt. 1270 members, 2638 people for 2022) with higher percentages in the Mid Western settlements. In Missouri abt. 29 % and Indiana abt. 33 % left the Wenger Mennonite church, in New York 20 % and in Kentucky close to 25 % (although in Christian County up to 30 %). In contrast, in Pennsylvania there weren't even any ministers that left to join the Midwest Conference and no members so far known. They had five bishops joining them. In 2021 they had 21 ministers of whom seven were ordained since the split. They also had 7 deacons who joined and in 2021 had 12 ordained deacons. There are several settlements with meeting houses in upstate New York, Missouri, Indiana, Illinois and Kentucky but also meeting places in Tennessee, Iowa.

Parts of a Stauffer Mennonite current split-off (Arthur Martin movement) in Illinois joined them, these are abt. 20 families in 2022. They exchange ministers with this group and are even present at ordinations. Current reports quote that the shifting of membership from the big Groffdale Mennonite church to the split-off group still grows. The OOMMC works together with the tractor-forbidding former Groffdale Mennonite group of Spencer, Tennessee.

A sign of all these combined churches is that their settlements have the right for slightly changed local rulings, instead of the Groffdale Conference nationwide rulings. That means here and there are material items forbidden or permitted which are not forbidden or permitted elsewhere under the same conference "umbrella". It is understood the special settlement variations are accepted if moving in or out from and to another settlement. A nationwide sign of this movement is the agreement on the computer issue.

== Belief and practice ==
The black carriages (called "Carridge or Fuhr" instead of Amish "Dachwägle") of the Wenger Mennonites distinguish them from the Amish in Lancaster County, Pennsylvania, who use gray ones. with round corners. Groffdale Conference buggies have a small window in the back and big ones in the upper part of left and right front door. It is also allowed to put rubber on the wheels. Currently just conservative Groffdale Conference members have steel on their wheels, while all Amish must have steel, they are not allowed to have rubber put on it. Stauffer Mennonites and Reidenbachers must also have steel. Smoothly driving carriages in Lancaster County belong to the Groffdale Conference, while harder sounding carriages are either Reidenbachers(black with windows) or Stauffers(black without windows, just a frontshield).

Young people during Rumspringen put lining on their carriages’ wheels, which is partly allowed among Reidenbachers. In former times Groffdalers drove a folding top buggy during courting time and as young couples, but that changed to the closed-up wagon type their parents use too, just with fancy lining on wheels etc.. In the late 1990s one could still see some folding-top buggies among them. Quoted Reasonings for the change were that getting cold hands could be prevented better and protection anyhow by the box-like type during heavy weather conditions. Well, this was for decades accepted, so mainly a longing for more comfort was prevailing, which changing times also allowed for the youth later.

They are mainly rural people, who work small farms. Groffdalers rather move than are fixed to landscape like Amish of Lancaster County and have a tendency to still prefer agriculture for everything else. The Amish have instead, staying in Lancaster County mostly, sought for other occupations. Initially concentrated in eastern Lancaster County, Pennsylvania, they resided in eight other states as of 2002.

Church members use modern self-propelled farm machinery and lawn mowers that have been refitted with steel wheels. Starting in the 1970s, some farmers used rubber belts and blocks to give wheels more traction, provide a smoother ride and reduce damage to public roads. This practice caused considerable debate within the community, which was resolved in 1999 with a compromise that allows limited use of rubber in the structure of steel wheels. Hard rubber or pneumatic tires are allowed on bicycles and machinery not requiring a driver, such as walk-behind equipment and wagons. Use of steel wheels ensures tractors are not used as a substitute for automobiles to run errands or to make more extensive trips than are convenient with horse-drawn carriages. The steel wheel rule prevents large agricultural operations, reinforcing an emphasis on small farms that provide manual labor for all of the family members.

The German language is used for Bible reading and singing in worship services and Pennsylvania German is used in worship services for preaching and is spoken at home and with other Old Orders. They meet in plain church buildings to worship, but do not have Sunday schools. Practicing nonresistance like other traditional Mennonite groups, during World War II they advised young men not qualifying for a farm deferment to accept jail terms instead of Civilian Public Service, the alternate used by other Anabaptist conscientious objectors.

== Population and distribution ==
Historical population
Year	Pop.	±% p.a.
1927	500	—
1957	1,450	+3.61%
1992	5,464	+3.86%
2002	17,775	+12.52%
2013	22,397	+2.12%
2018	24,060	+1.44%

The group consisted of about 500 members in their beginning in 1927 and grew to about 1,200 members in 1954. In 1957 there were 1,450 members. In 1992 the estimated membership had grown to 5,464.

As of 2002, the conference had grown to 49 congregations with 8,542 members and a total population of 17,775, with 20% and 66% of population below 5 years and below 21 years respectively. In 2008/9 membership reached 10,000 in 50 congregations.

In 2015 the group had a total population of 22,305 people of which 9,620 lived in Pennsylvania, 3,934 in New York, 2,395 in Wisconsin, 1,805 in Ohio, 1,545 in Missouri, 1,112 in Kentucky, 995 in Indiana, 600 in Iowa and 300 in Michigan.

The population had grown to 24,060 by the year 2018.

Around the year 2005, the population had an annual growth rate of 3.7 percent, doubling about every 20 years and was comparable to the growth rate of the Old Order Amish.

== See also ==
- John W. Martin Mennonites
- Ontario (Old Order) Mennonite Conference
- Stauffer Mennonite
- Orthodox Mennonites
- Noah Hoover Mennonite

== Literature ==
- Donald B. Kraybill and James P. Hurd: Horse-and-Buggy Mennonites - Hoofbeats of Humility in a Postmodern World, University Park, PA, 2006. (This 362-page book about the Groffdale Conference Mennonites is the most in depth study of any Old Order Mennonite group)
- Stephen Scott: An Introduction to Old Order and Conservative Mennonite Groups. Intercourse, PA 1996.
- Donald B. Kraybill and Carl Bowman: On the Backroad to Heaven: Old Order Hutterites, Mennonites, Amish, and Brethren. Baltimore 2001.
- Thomas J. Meyers and Steven M. Nolt: An Amish patchwork: Indiana's Old Orders in the Modern World. Bloomington, IN et al. 2005.
- Donald B. Kraybill: Concise Encyclopedia of Amish, Brethren, Hutterites, and Mennonites. Baltimore 2010.
- Donald B. Kraybill and C. Nelson Hostetter: Anabaptist World USA. Scottdale, PA and Waterloo, Ontario 2001.
