= Markham-Waterloo Mennonite Conference =

Canadian, progressive Old Order Mennonite church

- Classification: Mennonite
- Orientation: Anabaptist
- Origin: 1939; Ontario, Canada
- Congregations: 17

The Markham-Waterloo Mennonite Conference (MWMC) is a Canadian, progressive Old Order Mennonite church established in 1939 in Ontario, Canada. It has its roots in the Old Order Mennonite Conference in Markham, Ontario, and in what is now called the Regional Municipality of Waterloo. The Conference adheres to the 1632 Dordrecht Confession of Faith. The Markham-Waterloo Mennonite Conference is in fellowship with two similar car-driving Old Order Mennonite churches: the Weaverland Mennonite Conference and the Ohio-Indiana Mennonite Conference.

Ideologically this group shares many similar beliefs with other Old Order Mennonites groups, but also with Conservative Mennonites though differing in not having Sunday Schools or revival meetings. They identify more with the values of the Old Order groups but share common core values or distinctives.

According to a 2015 report, this group began "two outlying settlements, one in Beachburg in the Ottawa valley, begun in 1980. The congregation of North Haven was organized in 2009 in a new settlement near New Liskeard in northern Ontario".

== History ==
In the early 20th century, some of the Old Order Mennonites in Ontario and Pennsylvania began to use automobiles instead of horses and buggies, which resulted in a great deal of tension within the Old Order congregations. Because of this, "The Old Orders of Waterloo had ceased to affiliate with Markham in 1930 because of the automobile issue."

From 1931 the MWMC had been known as the Markham Mennonite Conference. When a significant group of Old Order Mennonites from the Waterloo County area of Ontario joined with the Markham church in the 1930s, the new MWMC church was formed in 1939.

The Old Order Mennonite Conference of Ontario had its roots in a division within the Mennonite Conference of Ontario in 1889 over such issues as the use of Protestant Sunday School methods, evangelistic meetings, church order, etc. According to the MWMC, "In 1889, the Mennonite Conference of Ontario divided on issues of assimilation to the larger Protestant society". A similar division occurred in 1893 in the Lancaster Mennonite Conference in Lancaster County, Pennsylvania, which resulted in the formation of the Weaverland Old Order Mennonite Conference.

In 2003, MWMC layman Donald Martin (ordained deacon in 2004) published a book entitled "Old Order Mennonites of Ontario: Gelassenheit, Discipleship, and Brotherhood" (Pandora Press, Kitchener, Ontario). His book is a detailed study of the history of most of the Old Order groups in Ontario, including the MWMC, the Old Order Mennonite Conference, the David Martin Mennonites, and the Orthodox Mennonites. This book also contains a primer on basic Old Order Mennonite beliefs. A more detailed study of Old Order Mennonite beliefs was published by the same author in 2007 called Distinctive Teachings of the Old Order People (Vineyard Publications, Wallenstein, Ontario). It explains Old Order Mennonite beliefs on issues such as 'Salvation', 'Discipleship', 'The Church', and 'Separation from the World'.

== Doctrine and practice ==
The MWMC "Statement of Faith" in brief indicates that "The Word of God, as revealed in the Scriptures, is the basis for the faith and practice of the Church. Salvation is through faith in Jesus Christ; the Apostolic Confession of Faith and the Dordrecht Eighteen Articles of Faith are taught and supported." Of the three historic creeds then, the MWMC supports the Apostles' Creed, but rejects the Nicene Creed, and the Athanasian Creed. The full text of the Dordrecht Confession of Faith of 1632 is reprinted in the church's booklet "Origin and Doctrine of the Mennonites" (shared by the Old Order Mennonite Conference), published in 1999. Within this booklet, the text of one of the writings of Menno Simons clarifies the MWMC belief of their view of the Trinity: "And thus we believe and confess ... that these three names, operations and powers, namely, the Father, Son, and Holy Ghost are one incomprehensible, indescribable, almighty, holy, only, eternal and sovereign God,". Simons continues, "And although they are three, yet in godliness, will, power and operation they are one, and can no more be separated from each other than the sun, brightness, and warmth;". This view is re-affirmed in the first article of the Dordrecht Confession of Faith, "Of God and the Creation of All Things", where it states, "Therefore we ... believe ... according to Holy Scripture, in one eternal, Almighty, and incomprehensible God - Father, Son, and Holy Ghost,".

The MWMC regards salvation as "a life process that (calls) for perseverance to the end." In his second book, Deacon Donald Martin states clearly that, for Anabaptists, "obedience and discipleship (are) also part of one's salvation". Martin reminds the reader that, "The Sixth Article (of the Dordrecht Confession) states that we become justified children of God ... after we have repented and amended our lives."

The MWMC Conference Report and General Recommendations briefly spells out the agreed upon expectations for membership in the church. Articles include the "Holy Life", "Courtship and Marriage", "Nonresistance", "Separation from the State", "Types and Places of Employment", "Uniformity Within the Church" and "Nonconformity to the world". It is also expected that members primarily drive black vehicles. Members cautiously use technologies like mobile phones, computers, and the Internet, but do not own televisions or radios.

The MWMC has its own parochial school system, which began in 1973. It shares some of its schools with the Ontario Old Order Mennonite Conference.

== Members and congregations ==
In 1957 the Markham-Waterloo Mennonite Conference had 748 baptized members. In 2011 membership had risen to 1,500 baptized members in 17 congregations. There are 15 congregations in Southwestern Ontario, 1 in Eastern Ontario, and 1 in Northeastern Ontario. From oldest to newest, the congregations include Martins (Waterloo, Ontario), Elmira, North Woolwich, Montrose East, Montrose West, Goshen East (near Drayton, Ontario), Goshen West, Fair Haven (Newton, Ontario), Fair Haven North, Maple View North (Alma, Ontario), Maple View South, Brotherston North (near Gowanstown, Ontario), Brotherston South, Beachburg (Cobden, Ontario), Minto Grove (Harriston, Ontario), Meadowside (Conn, Ontario), and North Haven (Thornloe, Ontario).

== Ministry ==
The Markham-Waterloo Mennonite Conference ordains deacons, ministers, and bishops from within their congregations by a process called "the lot". As of July 2012, there were 3 bishops, 19 ministers, and 18 deacons. Of the bishops, the longest-serving is Ernie Wideman, ordained as a minister in 1976, and as a bishop in 1986. Among the ministers, the longest-serving is Emerson Bauman, ordained in 1959; and among the deacons, Ralph Reibel is the longest-serving, ordained in 1983. The ministry is unpaid, and are self-employed as farmers or work in other related occupations.

== Succession of bishops ==
The Markham-Waterloo Mennonite Conference Succession of Bishops descends from the Weaverland Old Order Mennonite Conference. The Weaverland Old Order Bishops Moses Horning and Joseph Hostetter ordained Abraham Smith as a bishop in 1936 (ordained minister in 1927; died 1980). Bishops Abraham Smith, Joseph Hostetter (Pennsylvania), Moses Horst (Ohio), and William Ramer (Indiana) ordained Amsey Martin as a bishop in 1941 (minister in 1940; died 1985). Orvie Brubacher (minister 1976; died 1986) was ordained in 1979 by Bishops Abraham Smith, Amsey Martin, Luke Good (Pennsylvania), and Willis Martin (Pennsylvania). Ernie Wideman (see above) was ordained in 1986 by Bishops Orvie Brubacher, Louis Steiner (Ohio), and Leonard Brubaker (Pennsylvania). Abner Gingrich (minister 1981; died 2012), was ordained bishop in 1995 by Bishops Ernie Wideman, Amos Martin (Pennsylvania), and Leon Martin (New York). Bishops Ernie Wideman, Abner Gingrich, and Jerry Martin (Michigan), ordained Gordon Bauman (minister 1985) in 2009. Finally, Bishops Ernie Wideman, Abner Gingrich, and Gordon Bauman ordained Luke Martin (minister 2000) in 2011.
