= Orthodox Mennonites =

Religious groups in the US and Canada

The Orthodox Mennonites, also called Wellesley Orthodox Mennonites and Huron Orthodox Mennonites, are two groups of traditional Old Order Mennonites in Canada and the US with about 650 baptized members. Even though plain to a very high degree and primitivist concerning technology, they are rather intentionalist minded than ultra traditional. Since 1999 they were joined by several other Old Order Mennonite communities.

== History ==
In 1889 the Old Order Mennonites of Ontario separated from the main body of Mennonites by creating their own conference. In 1917 the David Martin Mennonites emerged under the leadership of Minister David B. Martin (1838-1920) from the Old Order Mennonite Conference in Ontario, mainly concerning issues of discipline.

=== The formation of the Orthodox Mennonites ===
The Orthodox Mennonites have a complicated history because they did not just separate from one other Old Order Mennonite group but split and merged from different Old Order groups.

In 1953 there was unrest among the David Martin Mennonites in the Waterloo Region in Canada, which resulted in the excommunication of numerous people. In 1954, a group of about 25 people, who attended the Rainham Old Order Mennonite Church, started to separate from the David Martin Mennonites. They joined a subgroup of the Stauffer Mennonites around the ministers Titus and Noah Hoover and Enoch Habegger of the merged Titus Hoover and Reformed Amish Christian Church.

Parts of this group around Noah Hoover later became the Noah Hoover Mennonites.The merger with the group around Titus Hoover and others was only partly successful and a majority left the group after some time, while the ones that stayed in the Titus Hoover group moved to Pennsylvania, where the Titus Hoovers were located.

Those that did not merge with the Titus Hoover group sought unity with the Reidenbach Mennonites of Lancaster County, Pennsylvania, under the leadership of Anson Hoover, but this merger was also not successful. During that time Plautdietsch-speaking Mennonites from Mexico, who were in Ontario to find a better economic situation there, joined the group.

In 1956 Minister Elam S. Martin was excommunicated from the David Martin Mennonites and joined the group. When Elam S. Martin became their bishop the group became known as "Elam Martins". In 1957 Peter O. Nolt and those with him in Pennsylvania joined the group. A third group, consisting of 50 people, who had left the David Martin Church under the leadership of deacon Samuel Horst, also entered this union in early 1958. On April 6, 1958, the merged groups held their first united communion meeting, and by 1962 they chose to call themselves the Orthodox Mennonite Church.

=== Division and partial reunification ===
In 1974 the Orthodox Mennonites divided, primarily over the question of whether the wearing of beards should be enforced or not, along with other issues of disciplinary interpretation. The beard wearing group, which included Bishop Elam S. Martin, moved to Howick, Ontario, en masse beginning in 1979. They were eventually nicknamed "Gorries", but are legally referred to as Orthodox Mennonite Church, Huron County, Ontario. The original group, nicknamed "Hoovers", remained in the Waterloo Region and are legally known as Orthodox Mennonite Church, Wellesley Township, Ontario.

In 1976 the Wellesley Orthodox group excommunicated their acting bishop, Anson Hoover, and Amos Sherk was advanced as acting bishop. In 1987 the majority of this group, some 70 members, went back to the David Martin Mennonites. Amos Sherk in 1986 was also excommunicated. The remaining families, with a few exceptions, then united with the Huron Orthodox group, so that the split of 1974 was largely overcome, and the majority of Orthodox Mennonites were a single group again. The original Wellesley Orthodox Mennonites have been under the leadership of their minister David E. M. Martin since 2009.

=== Influx from other groups ===
After 1989 the Huron Orthodox Mennonites were joined by some very conservative families from the Ontario Old Order Mennonite Conference, because their parent group decided to allow telephones in the home. This influx continued and until 2001, 37 families had made the transition to the Orthodox Mennonites. Between 1999 and 2005 the Huron Orthodox Mennonites were joined by four local groups of Old Order Mennonites, one of them coming from the Phares S. Stauffer group, a subgroup of the Stauffer Mennonites and one from the Henry Hoover group, a subgroup of the Reidenbach Mennonites. In 2009 about half of the Wellesley Orthodox, the original group of Orthodox Mennonites in the Waterloo Region in Ontario, Canada joined the Huron Orthodox Mennonites.

== Customs and beliefs ==
Orthodox Mennonites advocate a high moral standard and have many restrictions on technology. They live with no electricity, no telephones, and no propane gas in their homes. They do not own automobiles or computerized technologies, and farmers use work horses instead of tractors. They dress very plain, with or without beards and no neckties, and speak Pennsylvania German. Donnermeyer and Cory Anderson call them "an intentionalist minded, ultra-plain Old Order Mennonite body". They have made several changes of their Ordnung all of them tending to greater simplicity and nonconformity to the world. In worldview and practice they show some similarities with the Noah Hoover Mennonites.

== Settlements ==
The group originated in Ontario, where its main settlements are. Early centres were in Huron County. Adherents have also settled west of there, in Huron-Kinloss township in Bruce County, Ontario. In 2013 a family settled in Renfrew County, in the Admaston Bromley Township near Douglas, Ontario, in the Ottawa Valley.

As of 2014 there were two settlements of Orthodox Mennonites near Hopkinsville, Kentucky, one in Cerulean and one in Fairview. There is also a settlement in Snyder County, Pennsylvania.

In 2006 a group of 12 families, that split from the main body in the Walkerton area in southern Ontario, moved to Westbourne, Manitoba, where they settled on 1,000 hectares of farmland. In 2011 the group held about 20 families. They are the only Horse and Buggy Mennonites in Manitoba.

A growing settlement of Orthodox Mennonites is located in the Desbarats and Bruce Mines area of Northern Ontario. This group divided from the Walkerton community and other Ontario communities around 2012. This growing community runs several sawmills, a cedar planing mill, market gardens and an engineered truss factory.

== Membership ==
In 1996 there were 454 people in the church, of whom 222 were under the age of 16 In 2008/9 there were about 450 baptized members in five congregations in Canada and about 200 baptized members in 3 congregations in the USA. In 2012 there were about 200 families in Canada, 15 families in Snyder County, Pennsylvania, and 35 families in Trigg and Todd Counties in Kentucky.

== See also ==
- Anabaptists
- Mennonites
- Old Order Mennonite
- Martyrs Mirror
- Intentional communities

== Sources ==
- Donnermeyer, Joseph F.; Anderson, Cory (2015-01-07). "The Growth of Amish and Plain Anabaptist Communities in Kentucky". Journal of Amish and Plain Anabaptist Studies. 2 (2): 215–244. doi:10.18061/1811/63996. hdl:1811/63996. ISSN 2471-6383. OCLC 85053156.
- Kraybill, Donald; Hostetter, C. Nelson (2001). Anabaptist world USA. Scottdale, Pa: Herald Press. ISBN 9780836191639. OCLC 46641753.
- Kraybill, Donald (2010). Concise encyclopedia of Amish, Brethren, Hutterites, and Mennonites. Baltimore, Md: Johns Hopkins University Press. ISBN 9780801899119. OCLC 809669868.
- Martin, Charlotte (May 1998). "My Relatives: Ultra Conservative Mennonites" (PDF). The Mennonite Historical Society of Ontario. pp. 1–7. OCLC 1007982062.
- Martin, Donald (2003). Old Order Mennonites of Ontario : gelassenheit, discipleship, brotherhood. Kitchener, Ont. Scottdale, Pa: Pandora Press; Herald Press. ISBN 1894710339. OCLC 52031629.
- Reimer, Margaret (2008). One quilt, many pieces : a guide to Mennonite groups in Canada. Waterloo, Ont: Herald Press. ISBN 9780836194050. OCLC 182040243.
- Schrock, Fredrick (2001). The Amish Christian Church : its history and legacy. Monterey, TN: F.J. Schrock. ISBN 9780971250802. OCLC 47730878.
- Scott, Stephen (1996). An introduction to Old Order and Conservative Mennonite groups. Intercourse, PA: Good Books. ISBN 9781680992434. OCLC 891422385.
