= Reidenbach Old Order Mennonites =

Reidenbach Old Order Mennonites, also called Thirty-Fivers, comprise about 15 Old Order Mennonite churches, which emerged from a split of the Groffdale Old Order Mennonite Conference in 1942 and subsequent splits. The people who formed the Reidenbach Mennonites Church were more conservative than the members of the Groffdale Conference. The original name of the new church in 1946 was "Reidenbach Mennonite Church".

== History ==
During World War II around the year 1942 there was a conflict among the Groffdale Conference Mennonites about the question if members of the Conference should send their male youth to government-run Civilian Public Service camps or if the young males should rather go to jail. Dozens of members refrained therefore from communion and many of them tried to join other like-minded groups. After some years, 35 of these about 60 church members who opted against Civilian Public Service camps on May 30, 1946, formed a separate church and built a meetinghouse in 1947 close to Reidenbach, an unofficial place name in Earl Township, Lancaster County, Pennsylvania, where there is a Reidenbach Road. Since then they became known as Thirty-Fivers, Fimfunddreissiger, Reidenbachers, Reidenbach Mennonites or after their many divisions obtained new names after leaders, influential members, patriarchs or bishops. The Thirty-Fivers naming still dominates and even is used by themselves.

Their later history is characterized by a long series of splits, the major one being a division in 1977 about the use of bottled gas, which left the 158 members in two groups, one of 90 members, the John J. Martin group, who forbade bottled gas, and one of 68 members, the Amos Martin group, who allowed it. The John J. Martin group later saw several further splits.

== Splits ==
The table below lists all splits of more than one family until the middle of the year 1996:

Name of the group	Membership in July 1996	Date of split or begin	Parent group
Amos Martin Reidenbach	126	30 May 1946	Groffdale Conference
Peter O. Nolt Reidenbach	31	Early 1956	Amos Martin
John J. Martin Reidenbach	48	17 Nov. 1977	Amos Martin
Kleine Reidenbach Gemeinde	37	21 June 1981	John Martin
Henry M. Hoover Reidenbach	24	19 Oct. 1985	John Martin
Aaron Z. Martin Reidenbach	28	22 Feb. 1987	John Martin
Rufus Z. Martin Reidenbach	19	10 Dec. 1987	Kleine Reidenbach Gemeinde

The reasons behind these splits have been published in a book, they can for short being described as "The Role of the Worldly Government split" in 1956, "The Bottled Gas" split in 1977, "The Fancy Carriage split" in 1981, "The Holy Kiss among Women split" in late 1985, "The Appointment Question split" in early 1987, "The Matthew, 12,36 Split" in late summer in 1987. These splits created groups of more than one family, separated families have to be added to it which also have a story of splits behind their formations.

Since 1996 some more splits occurred and new splinter groups were started, some one-family units by now.

- The Rufus Z. Martin group split up in mostly family circles, there is just one group now having several families which is led by Eli M. Hoover. All other groups are separate families or remnants of families. Many grown kids joined other 35er groups, some even moved down to Kentucky.
- The Aaron Z. Martin group of Wenzel Road split in 2004, forming the Wayne H. Martin group, This new group moved down to Kentucky. Aaron Z. Martin Gmay grew again (later under bishop Nathan H. Martin, his son) but split again in about 2023, 2/3 joined the Paul F. Martin group (now under bishop Mark Martin).
- Also the Wayne H. Martin group of Fairview, Ky split up in 2023, it almost dissolved. Most members( it had at that time over 30 couples) tried, some were successful in joining the local Martin Fivers group. This group is dissolved.
- The Kleine Reidenbach Gemeinde/Little Reidenbach Church dissolved in 2004 after many splits, their church house is not used for 22 years. One of their departing groups known as Amos W. Hoover group/ or now LLoyd Hoover´s group grew up to 8 couples until 2026. By that number they might reuse the old Little Reidenbach Church house, but no intentions are known so far. So far there 10-12 carriages with passengers/families seem to be able to gather in farm houses.
- Also the Henry M. Hoover group dissolved: One part joined the Gorrie Mennonites, one united with the Wayne H. Martin group in 2004, some joined the Martin Fivers. Henry M. Hoover became a minister of the Gorrie Mennonites, so as his son David.
- The John Martin Group split in 2007("The Sabbath/Ten Commandment Split"). Afterwards their former bishop Daniel Hoover with his group moved to Kentucky abt. 2010. In late 2009 this moving arranging group under Daniel M. Hoover became known as "strict 35ers" when local news reported about them in a "hiding a kid case/custody case". An outsider´s underage kid wanted to join, it came from a destructed family and the fights of its parents involved also this small group. Their former church group, the John Martin group was then already locally known as Paul F. Martin´s group, now their bishop is Mark Martin. They experienced an exponentially growth afterwards, and are over 40 couples in 2026.
- This Daniel Hoover group, just being two years down in Kentucky, split again in 2012, two splitting families and one husabnd with some daughters joined later in 2014 a Vevay Amish, Switzerland County, IN group, so there are now even "Amish Fivers" existing. In November 2024 Daniel´s group again split, forming the Ivan Hoover group (so far described as the Sermon-non-Confirmation Split).

Time will tell what happens next, but so far the story continued to split and split again, oftentimes in cases, when the Reidenbach churches reached a good size of member couples among the conservative groups. Nowadays even memberships shift from group to group and there are not anymore many young people who stay with their parents when they split and accept what had been formerly expressed to one son whose parents split: "Es ist der Harr sei Wille, es dir ledig bleiwet!" (It´s the Lord´s will that you stay single/unmarried!"). They now rather seek company in some of the bigger 35er groups instead of accepting, having no company for "Rumschringe" at all. Or they have even more outside connections and marry outside. Some 35er couples during the last years have become members of Groffdale Conference Mennonites and accepted Bann and Meidung by their home church, this is mostly done by some Martin 35ers, but in Kentucky also by the almost dissolved Wayne H. Martin group´s members during their transition time. The boundaries of ideology which kept groups in former times much more separate, are somewhat raised down.

Two of the Reidenbach Mennonite groups had grown until 2026 to a good size of membership families: The Amos Martin group (big church/Gross Gemee, according to their 2025 Directory "Reidenbach Mennonite Conference") has now at least three settlements and over 123 families/households(2025). It is the most liberal Reidenbacher church attracting even members of conservative churches. Due to its big size and three separated settlements -two in Penna, one in Kentucky- the Amos Martin group or Martin Fivers started to print own directories. Their first one known was printed in 2013, almost every other year they print a new one, lately 2025, and these show a remarkable growth, especially in the Northern settlement. The second group is the John Martin group (now Mark Martin´s) which grew up to ca. 40 couples in 2026. Their growth however really started after their late split in 2007. It was reported a new way of leadership was mostly the reasoning for atrracting outside 35er families. The third one was the Wayne H. Martin group, which had over thirty couples up to 2023, but then had such hard conflicts and a split, that most agreed to rather join the local Martin Fiver group then continue with reduced memberships as a separate unit. Just their former bishop and minister stayed separate and even their kids start now to join the big 35er group in Christian County, Ky.

The last updated and calculated list of Reidenbach Mennonites shows eight groups with more than one family belonging to in 2022:

Name of the group	Membership in 2022	Date of split or begin	Parent group
Amos Martin Reidenbach group, Groß Reidenbach	321	30 May 1946	Groffdale Conference
Peter O. Nolt Reidenbach group	28	Early 1956	Amos Martin
John J. Martin Reidenbach group, now Mark Martin group	>68	1977	Amos Martin
Kleine Reidenbach Gemeinde	0	21 June 1981	John Martin
Henry M. Hoover Reidenbacher	0	19 Oct. 1985	John Martin
Aaron Z. Martin Reidenbach group	<59	22 Feb. 1987	John Martin
Wayne H. Martin Reidenbach* group	98	2004	Aaron Z. Martin*
Daniel M. Hoover Reidenbach group, "strict 35er"(2009)	61	2007	John Martin
Rufus Z. Martin Reidenbachers	<34	10 Dec. 1987	Kleine Reidenbach Gemeinde
Amos W. Hoover Reidenbach group	34	1998	Kleine Reidenbach Gemeinde

For 2026 the statistics are estimated for their groups as follows:

Name of the group	Membership in 2026	Date of split or begin	Parent group
Amos Martin Reidenbach group, Groß Reidenbach, ,now Reidenbach Mennonite Conference	228*	30 May 1946	Groffdale Conference
Peter O. Nolt Reidenbach group, Versailles, MO	?	Early 1956	Amos Martin
John J. Martin Reidenbach group, now Mark Martin group	>126	1977	Amos Martin
Aaron Z. Martin Reidenbach group, now Nathan H. Martin	>26	22 Feb. 1987	John Martin
Wayne H. Martin Reidenbach group*	0	2004	Aaron Z. Martin*
Daniel M. Hoover Reidenbach group, "strict 35er"(2009), Clearfield Mennonite Church, Leitchfield, Ky	>30**	2007	John Martin
Ivan M. Hoover Reidenbach group, Leitchfield, Ky	>40**	14 Nov 2024	Daniel M. Hoover
Rufus Z. Martin Reidenbachers	abt. 8	10 Dec. 1987	Kleine Reidenbach Gemeinde
Eli M. Hoover Reidenbach group	abt. 21	during 2010s	Rufus Z. Martin
Amos W. Hoover Reidenbach group	abt. 36	1998	Kleine Reidenbach Gemeinde

- * According to the examination of the latest Directory of Reidenbach Mennonite Conference, this is the current membership of the biggest group, calculations done by the Elizabethtown college´s Anabaptist department: There is probably a calculation mistake by just counting spouses(husbands and wives, widowers and widows) here and not including 18 years old children. Memberships don´t start with being married, but mostly when people reach the age of 18 upwards. When reachingh the age of 20 mosty are already members, or have left. In the newest Directory there are 121 notes for mostly couple households(also widowed persons, older singles), plus two handwritten addings of new couples and handwritten birth notes, laid into each copy. That would mean to rather double memberships when beginning calculations. Home staying grown Kids(18+, and single) surely have not have been included in this calculation. See: https://groups.etown.edu/amishstudies/files/2026/04/OOMs_horse-and-buggy_2025.pdf
- ** Two couples could not be listed so far for one or another group.
- As of 2026, there were these following known separated Reidenbach Mennonite families + some singles who consider themselves as independent gatherings/churches/groups: David M. Hoover´s most kids and widow, the couple of David Z. Hoover(without their kids), Earl H. Hoovers(4), Jonas H. Hoovers(>8), Leon H. Hoover(husband, alone), Jesse H. Martins(just couple + kids) and Rufus H. Martin´s group (mostly his mom and some siblings). Memberships vary between 1+ and 15+ in these groups by now. Many of these group, so far as having kids in dating ages, can be considered transitional groups. It is doubtable they will gather a bigger holding or grow even.

This calculation took in reference that "Unterricht" (Unnerricht in Pennsylvania German, Instruction class for baptism and church membership) normally starts with 18 years when young people start to desire church memberships. There are hardly young people joining after being 20 yrs. Therefore, one can assume and count people of 18 years as members. For some families the data is not complete. Many data is from the Muddy Creek Farm Library's family lists of Mennonites, then Zimmerman Family book as a source, the standard work of Albertsen, requests by letters and interviews.

== Church Houses ==
Many groups of the Reidenbach Mennonites do not have separate church houses, but so far known the Reidenbach Mennonite bigger groups have these church houses:

Old bishop Amos Martin's group, Gross Gemeinde, Gross-Gemay, Big Reidenbach Church:

1) Lancaster County, Pa on 131 Martin Road, New Holland (the original house since 1947, remodeled in 1970)

2) Montour-/Northumberland-County, Pa: Limestone Mennonite Church, 2nd church (late 1980s)

3) Christian-/ Todd-County, Ky: new built church, 2229 Roger Q Mill Road, Pembroke (Mennonite Church), 3rd church (2019)

Henry Hoover group(dissolved):

1) first church in houses and local parochial school at Hoover Lane, Hopkinsville (1989-2002)

2) then building of Fairview Mennonite church (2002-2006)

3) "Gorrie Fivers" meet in old bulk food store at the late Henry Hoover´s place

Kleine Reidenbach Gemeinde, Little Reidenbach Church(dissolved):

1) Snyder Drive church house, for years unused, as church dissolved (1981/2-abt 2004)

Aaron Z. Martin group(now Nathan H. Martin bishop)

1) about 14 years house services (1987-2001)

2) then Wentzel Road: Black Creek Mennonite Church (since 2001)

John F. Martin group, Paul F. Martin group:

1) used alternately old church with Amos Martin group, 1977-2007

2) house services, old church building used by Daniel M. Hoover group meanwhile, 2007-2010

3) after moving of Daniel M. Hoover group down to Kentucky, they became again users of old church house, since 2010

Daniel M. Hoover group:

1) used old church house, shared with big group, 2007-2010

3) house service until church house was built, 2010-2012

2) Grayson County, Ky: Clearfield Mennonite church, since 2012

Wayne Martin group, later Samuel Hoover grou p(Fairview Mennonite Church):

1) Wentzel Road church: Black Creek Church (shared with Aaron Z. Martin group), 2004-until moving

2) Fairview Mennonite Church, Ky 2006-2023, several times horsesheds attached

3) Fairview Mennonite Church not anymore used (late 2023)

So at all there are seven Reidenbach Mennonite church houses:

1) Amos Martin group: 3 (original one shared)

2) Aaron Z. Martin group: 1 (alone)

3) Daniel M. Hoover group: 1 (shared with new group of Ivan Hoover)

4) Paul F. Martin group: 1 (shared with 1))

5) Wayne H. Martin group: 1 (until 2023, closed)

6) Little Reidenbach group: 1 (alone, closed since 2004)

== Customs and belief ==
The belief of the Reidenbach Mennonites almost does not differ much from other Old Order Mennonites, except in the Meidung (shunning) issue and in a greater emphasize of keeping rules.

Reidenbach Mennonites emphasize complete removal of memberships combined with strong shunning in social matters unless Wenger Mennonites, who rather exclude members from taking communion if expelled, but do not shun much socially.

Another issue is their understanding that technological backwardness is a strong helping tool for stepping up the heavenly ladder, keeping and holding on to material rules became very much a matter of salvation: One former Henry Hoover Mennonite deacon p.g. expressed to another member, who had a crawler:

„Dann wittscht du liewer de tractor hawwe wie in de Himmel kumme?“!

— (said to A.M.H. by A.H.M. and translated as: "Then you would rather keep the tractor then entering heaven?").

Such and other expressions, a strong connection of what is allowed and where it would lead to (hell or heaven) are manifest and solid grounded in their understanding of living a Christian life. Being "zurickhaltig", "humble and backwards minded" in technological areas is very much connected to earning a much more than living hope of salvation. This is also valid for the other Old Order Mennonite and Amish groups, but in most instances hardly so openly expressed.

Reidenbach Mennonites have also a feeling of exclusiveness and righteousness: Former bishop Amos Martin expressed once:

"There is just one true church and that is the Reidenbach church"("Es ist just een rechte Gemeh und sell ist die Reidenbach Gemeh!")

This is not unique to them, but it gives a reasoning for its group's existence (other churches also define borderlines to other churches and therefore make it sure who is right and who consequently is on the other side of the fence...but not so extremely, rather as a quiet kept issue with many inconsistencies if requested).

Old Order Mennonites are not spreading around that they feel saved, are new born etc. (an emotionally based faith), in that sense they see humbleness more important and even doubt these doctrinal interpretations of many mainstream churches, so they deny a doctrine of "once saved, always saved", "give your life to Jesus and you are saved(and nothing more has to be done)", Jesus is also Savior for them, he gave his life for them, but his Sacrifice does not mean to live a life without keeping rules.

Old Order Mennonnites are careful not to take God's doomsday judgements into their own hands (knowing to be saved), but hope he will give salvation to them, they accept their sinfulness until life's end and worthlessness ("Mir sin net würdig fer") for salvation. Consequently, one looks for what can be done to have a stronger hope. Earning salvation by works attitudes grew as a result of emotionally not being certain to get God's grace. There is one Reidenbach Mennonite group who emphasized (if still nowadays unknown) that just the unjustified would have to give answer on doomsday, while the justified would not need to, this created the Aaron Z. Martin group in 1987. That was so far the closest step to any kind of knowledge of salvation.

Another evidence of the strong connection of keeping rules and having therefore a better hope for salvation is the handling of people who disobey. After admonishings, successless demandings of confessions they are expelled with the words: You are "dem Teufel übergeben zum Verderben deines Fleisches" ("giving over to the devil" (´s side, the world, led by the devil, under control of the devil) for the spoilage of the flesh). The sinner is outcast figuratively and now outside of God's flock, he shall repent, accept his wrongdoings and there is hope he will obey in future to all these rules and come back and kneel down. This way of expulsion is defined as according to God's will. Being expelled means if staying unrepentable being outside of any hope for salvation, as the church can loose and bind on God's behalf on earth, which will also being accepted in heaven. There is biblical reference for this dealing.

Reidenbach Ordnungen (set of church rules) do not allow cars, rubber wheels on buggies, tractors for fieldwork, TV, radio, telephones and electricity from public lines. Pennsylvania German is the language used at home and with other Old Orders, children go to parochial schools and dress is a very conservative form of plain dress at least among the conservative groups. Their Ordnung is more conservative than that of mainstream horse and buggy Old Order Mennonites ("Wenger" and Ontario) but less conservative than the Ordnung of the "Pikers". All these Ordnung rules serve several issues: keeping a group together, increasing Gemeinschaft, keeping outside influence out, staying faithful to old ways and theology, preventing modern thinking entering (rules of women, in sexual acceptances, in doctrinal areas, in scientific fields..)

Due to the many splits of Reidenbach Mennonites, their Ordnungen differ somewhat nowadays and have gone different ways: The Ordnung of the Amos Martin group is somewhat relaxed for business men in regard of cell phone ownerships and use.Telephones became allowed for farmers in booths some yards from the houses too. Nowadays there Directory shows a majority has a phone. Other 35er groups, except the late Wayne H. Martin group, didn´t allow any phone so far Also in clothes styles there is a growing difference, while the Daniel Hoover group looks rather like Pikers with unicolor shirts and some families emphasized getting more simple in lifestyle, the Amos Martin people, especially among the young are influenced by Cowboy fashion trends (boots, hats upfolded). But even they have families with unicolor clothes without flower patterns on dresses. Even in head coverings differences are now more visible. Formerly it was quoted the Wenger Mennonites were covering ears completely, Reidenbach Mennonites just covered half of the ear. This cannot be said anymore for the conservatives of the John Martin side. The coverings of the Daniel M. Hoover group are of heavier material.

While the mother group of all Reidenbach Mennonites the Groffdale Conference Mennonites is quoted as liberal, 35ers have such a tendency in life areas not expected, like having rather racing bikes (just among the Amos Martin side so far seen) then normal types.

At all, even their Ordnungen are changing and adapting to outside pressure, new inventions are discussed if allowable or having to be forbidden. The Daniel M. Hoover group, a very conservative branch, allows solar panels of a certain size and reloads thereby small batteries in their sheds, while many of them still use old-style outhouses, non flushing water toilets. Henry M. Hoover's group had for example flushing water toilets allowed and get rid of them when a part of them were joining the Gorrie Mennonites.

Due to some marriage problems resulting from splits (partners separated in church affiliations) two Reidenbach groups used the law for custody or visitation rights of their kids. This was done by the Kleine Reidenbach Gemeinde against a former Henry Hoover member unsuccessfully(when he moved down to Kentucky), and by the Daniel Hoover side against also a former member after 2014 successfully. In these cases they used attorneys and left the traditional way of complete defenselessness and not using state powers in order to solve problems. In the latter case there was high pressure, so one side argued, to use lawyers because the case could not be solved otherwise. It is however traditional ruling that Mennonites shall not use any attorneys and bring people before courts. In these cases where couples became separated (even using the law), they still stayed formally married afterwards, but in reality are almost divorced, just the last formal step hasn´t been done. Reading some writings from the old Dutch Anabaptist writer Dirk Philipps they found reasoning for getting couples asunder by using the terminus "Ketzer, Heretic, Unbeliever" for the non agreeing part and after defining each split as necessary for religious reasons. It is assumeable that the new Ivan Hoover group continues this doctrine, as the mother group of Daniel M. Hoover. Other Reidenbachers´groups haven´t forced couples after a church division to separate so far. Anyhow: During their whole churches´ histories it was expected, sometimes also pressured on, that dating couples stopped dating, after their churches split and they became members of different groups. In the majority of such cases they stopped, some even to stay single for life afterwards.

35ers still hold on to the old doctrine: being separate from the state, rather suffer, not solving problems via courts in any matter and not using state powers for own intentions, but some churches of them had not to experience such clashes after a split, when husband and wife were separated in their future faith and it was expected of them also to separate. In the past it was simply accepted that they stayed together.

== Marriage and disease ==
There are basically four family names among the Reidenbachs: Martin, Hoover, Reiff and Nolt, because there was only a small founder group.

Over the years two names were added, one by a marriage with an outsider who converted, then went with the Kleine Reidenbach church side and finally left, and one by a convert from the Wenger Mennonites who even became Prediger(minister), so that Reidenbach Mennonites are nowadays carry also names as Starr and Leid, both among the conservative groups.

Among the "liberal" Amos Martin side they got a female convert who married a Thirty-Fiver man, so there was a Mrs Reiff, who came "from the world". This couple left after some years. It is predictable that the Nolt name will die out among the 35ers, it is anyhow just among the Peter O. Nolt, Missouri group. This group has no young people anymore.

It is known that some other outsiders attended services and thought for some time to join, but finally left. Reidenbachs growth is therefore mainly by reproduction, not by conversions from the "Welt/world" as they would name it. Depending on groups and individuals some have been more open to befriend interested persons, others were rather more closed up and glad to see these persons left. This latter point of view even created a split among the Kleine Reidenbach Gemeinde.

In 2022 Reidenbach Mennonite had following surnames in numbers:

Surname	Number of Families by known data
Hoover	78.5
Leid	1
Martin	86.5
Nolt	1
Reiff	8.5
Starr	3.5

(0.5 means there is at least one widowed family included, counting just half. Two widowed families would count for 1.0, etc. A complete family would count for 1. In these family numbers several widowed families might be included. Survey is mainly based on data material of 2016 and 2017, so that the numbers of families surely have increased. Obituaries since 2016/7 have been included so far known too and reduced family number by 0.5 in each case a partner died. This survey shows therefore that two family names predominate, Reiffs never grew much and many left, Leid is a young converted man's family and Starrs have already founded new families, so kids are grown-up and intermarried. The number of Leids will grow as kids enter Rumspring time.)

First cousin marriages are normally forbidden among Old Order Mennonites, but in the first years of the Reidenbachs the small size of the group led to a high percentage of such marriages, as young members could hardly find partners inside the church who were less close related and marrying outside the church was and is still no option because of the doctrine to marry "in the Lord", "among same believers". This permissive step to allow first cousins to marry was even supported by Old Testament examples, like in the case of Jacob. The traditional line of permission started with second cousins, this would have been disastrous for them if still kept.

From 1947 to 1965 therefore 83.3 percent of all marriages were first cousin marriages. The fast natural growth of the group improved the situation and from 1965 to 1977 only 5.9 percent of all marriages were first cousin marriages. The split in 1977 aggravated the situation again and the old problem arose anew. Therefore, the Reidenbachs are in all likelihood the most inbred group of Anabaptists.

Generally first cousin marriages are forbidden in Pennsylvania, Kentucky and Missouri, all three states also declare it void if happening, but these marriages exist anyhow.

According to hearsay it was already answered on the request of relationship: "Yes, by Adam and Eve!", so bypassing the problem answering honestly by a joke. So far known they are getting no official licenses, if happening in first cousin cases it is due to negligence or misleading of the official. One also has to consider people do not ask too much anyhow, they look away at the registering office and are used that many people of same surnames marry each other among Mennonites Martins, among Amish in Lancaster County Stoltzfuses, which have the same ancestors, some one generation ago, others several. The Reidenbach Mennonite ministry of each group performs the ceremony of marrying first cousins anyhow, even if forbidden, and register them later, especially when they deal with farm purchases and deeds transfers. Their marriages are not announced to the public and therefore resemble common law marriages. In regard of their situation (having chances or none at all), they support the Bible verse to obey rather God (´s law) then man (´s). The Bible allows these marriages in the Old Testament, that is mandatory law restriction for them. It disallows other relationships, but first cousins are biblically permitted.

First cousin marriage are in many of the current conservative branches a normal happening. Among the Amos Martin group they are happening in fewer cases today. Among the conservatives at least four groups have some couples which are double cousins in relationship to each other. The rate of double cousin marriages go up from 10% to about 60% in these groups. One has to add two separate couples which are related to each other the same way. In one group there is already a single couple, whose grandparents were first cousins, their parents double cousins and they are also double cousins to each other.

In most instances in all of these new formed groups with more than one family the rate of first cousin marriages increases fast over 30% during the years following. There is hardly any other choice if one wants to marry a sympathetic person. But even with this high degree of inbreeding, some families of the same condition genetically are affected hard, while others have just healthy children. Genetics call it clustering and research why some are so much affected and others not at all.

Looking to diseases due to high inbreeding rates, some of them have Hirschsprung's disease and Maple syrup urine disease. Financing hospital bills are becoming therefore for some groups a hard issue, even when other related groups help.

== Membership ==
Old quotes were: In 1994 there were about 300 adult members divided into 10 subgroups. In 2008/9 membership was about 375 in 10 subgroups. In 2015 the membership of all branches was 371 in 18 congregations and the total population was 740.

These numbers were just valid and accurate for 1994, all later years are estimations hardly based on qualified calculations. Even the number of congregations/churches/groups were two high. The Reidenbach Mennonites have a comparable high degree of growth like the Wenger Mennonites, their numbers are also doubling every 17 to 22 years. There is a very low loss of numbers to the world and even due to problems finding some marriage partners among some groups (or even having no chances at all), the membership numbers must be much higher than 371 after 21 years (from 1991 to 2015), which would not even come close to any doubling, but means either the 35er stopped child birthing or masses left, which both took not place. So the last numbers are unreasonable.

Current countings show that the Reidenbach Mennonites have already reached the combined membership numbers of 758 in 2022.

Association	Number of Members in 2022
Peter Nolt Group, Missouri	28
Groß Reidenbach Gemeinde	321
all conservative groups after 1977	409

There are existing eight Reidenbach Mennonite groups or congregations with more than one family and seven units of separated families who can be considered a church itself in 2022.

== Bibliography ==
- Karsten-Gerhard Albertsen: The History & Life of the Reidenbach Mennonites (Thirty Fivers). Morgantown, PA 1996.
- Mark Z. Hoover: The Inside Story. Leitchfield, KY 2011.
- Stephen Scott. An Introduction to Old Order and Conservative Mennonite Groups. Intercourse, PA 1996 ISBN 9781561481019
