= Ontario (Old Order) Mennonite Conference =

Group in the Canadian province of Ontario

The Ontario (Old Order) Mennonite Conference is a moderate Old Order Mennonite group in the Canadian province of Ontario, that was formed in 1889 as a reaction to modernizing trends among the Mennonites in Ontario. The members use horse and buggy for transportation. As of 2020, they also have a colony in the Canadian province of Prince Edward Island.

== Name ==
The Conference is sometimes referred to as Old Order Mennonite Church (e. g. Donald Kraybill) , whereas the name given above is used by the Mennonite World Conference and by Stephen Scott . A popular name for the members is Woolwich Mennonites or just Woolwichers, because Abraham Weber Martin, the bishop who was the main force behind the formation of the group, resided in Woolwich, Ontario.

== History ==
Since 1871, when six bishops in Ontario declared there should be no association with bishop Jacob Wisler of Ohio, who was dismissed because of his conservative stance, there were tensions among the Mennonites in Ontario about the question how much modern practices like Sunday School, revival meetings, English language preaching etc. should be introduced. The final break between the Old Orders and the modernizers occurred in 1889 when there were two different Conferences, because there was a conflict about the date of the conference.

== Belief and practice ==
The members use horse and buggy for transportation. Their stance on technology is quite similar to that of the Groffdale Conference Mennonite Church. The German language is used in worship services, and Pennsylvania German is spoken at home and with members of the own group as well as with other Old Order groups.

== Controversy ==
In November 2020, during the COVID-19 pandemic in Ontario, both the Region of Waterloo Public Health unit and Wellington-Dufferin-Guelph Public Health issued orders to close Old Order schools and places of worship in their regions and to limit social interactions. The orders were issued because of extremely high infection rates. In Waterloo Region, the orders applied to sects "including Markham, Old Colony, and David Martin Mennonite communities", according to a news report. Both agencies cited a lack of cooperation with public health requirements that were intended to minimize the spread of the virus. In an interview with the Waterloo Region Record, bishop Peter Brubacher, ("bishop for seven Old Order Mennonite church districts" in north Waterloo Region according to another news agency), made this comment, "I guess to be frank and honest, a lot of people really didn’t take it that serious, to isolate".

== Population and distribution ==
Historical population
Year	Pop.	±%
1957	1,061	—
1992	2,200	+107.4%
2008	3,200	+45.5%
2013	6,831	+113.5%

In 1957 the Old Order Mennonite Conference of Ontario had a membership of 1,061, unbaptized family members not counted. In 1992 there were about 2,200 adult members in 16 congregations. In 2008/9 membership was about 3,200 in 36 congregations. By the year 2018 the population of the community had grown to 6,831 individuals.

== See also ==
- Stauffer Mennonite
- Orthodox Mennonites
- Noah Hoover Mennonite
- David Martin Mennonites
- Reidenbach Old Order Mennonites

== Literature ==
- Donald B. Kraybill and James P. Hurd: Horse-and-buggy Mennonites: Hoofbeats of Humility in a Postmodern World. University Park, PA 2006.
- Stephen Scott: An Introduction to Old Order and Conservative Mennonite Groups. Intercourse, PA 1996.
- Donald Kraybill: Concise Encyclopedia of Amish, Brethren, Hutterites, and Mennonites, Baltimore 2010.
