= Ohio Wisler Mennonite =

The Ohio Wisler Mennonite Churches, also called Ohio Wisler Mennonite Conference, are a group of churches with a Mennonite tradition, that formed in 1973. They are not considered to be Old Order anymore, but are widely seen as Conservative Mennonites. Stephen Scott lists them as "Ultra Conservative" (Mennonites).

== History ==
In 1973 a large group of Wisler Mennonites in Ohio split from the Ohio-Indiana Mennonite Conference, a car-driving Old Order Mennonite group, and formed the more modern Ohio Wisler Mennonites.

== Customs and beliefs ==
After the division from the Ohio-Indiana Mennonite Conference, the Ohio Wisler Mennonites adopted Sunday Schools and a more aggressive approach to outreach. They have altered the manner of worship from the Old Order form.

== Members and congregation ==
In 1995 the Ohio Wisler Mennonite Churches had 131 households in four congregations. In the year 2000 they had 421 adherents with a total population of about 800 people in five congregations, all in Ohio. According to website of the Mennonite World Conference they had 322 adherents in four congregations in 2018.
