= Ohio-Indiana Mennonite Conference =

The Ohio-Indiana Mennonite Conference, also called Wisler Mennonites, is an Old Order Mennonite church body, whose Ordnung allows the ownership and private use of cars. They are quite similar to the Weaverland Old Order Mennonite Conference.

== History ==
The Old Order Mennonites in Indiana were the first of all Old Order groups among Mennonites. They emerged in 1872, when there was a wave of modernization, led by Daniel Brenneman and John F. Funk. Jacob Wisler (1808–1889), bishop in Indiana since 1851, was a staunch conservative who clashed with the modernizers, who tried to silence him. In 1867 they were successful and Jacob Wisler's ministry was suspended. In 1872 Jacob Wisler and preachers Christian Bare and John Weaver were expelled from the Indiana Mennonite conference. About 100 members sided with them and formed the Old Order Mennonites of Indiana, who became known under the name of Wisler Mennonites or just Wislers. Later they were joined by Mennonites from Ohio.

In 1907 the Old Order Mennonites of Ohio and Indiana split into two factions. The group that was less traditional kept the name of Wisler Mennonites, but took the formal name Ohio-Indiana Mennonite Conference, while the more conservative fraction became known under the name of John W. Martin Mennonites. The central conflict was about telephone use and the English language in preaching, which a majority of the Wisler group wanted to be allowed. In the year 1924 the Wisler group also allowed the ownership of cars. A large group of more modern Wisler Mennonites in Ohio split from the Ohio-Indiana Mennonite Conference and formed the Ohio Wisler Mennonites in 1973.

== Membership and congregations ==
Year	Membership
1954	150
1994	637
2000	780
2008/9	925

In 1954 there were 150 baptized members in the Ohio-Indiana Mennonite Conference and in 1994 there were 637. In the year 2000 membership was 780 in 7 congregations, which were located in Indiana (420 members, 3 congregations), Ohio (228, 2), Michigan (108, 1) and Minnesota (24, 1). In 2008/9 membership was 925 in 7 congregations.

== See also ==
- Yellow Creek Mennonite Church
