= John W. Martin Mennonites =

Former Christian denomination in Indiana

The John W. Martin Mennonites were a group of Old Order Mennonite mainly in Elkhart County, Indiana, that existed from 1907 to 1972 as an independent church, which never allowed the ownership of automobiles.

The group emerged when they split in 1907 from the Indiana (Old Order) Mennonite Conference (Wislers), because the Indiana Mennonite Conference had allowed telephone and electricity. The bishop, who was instrumental to the split, was John W. Martin, whose name the new group took.

There were also three small congregations of John W. Martin Mennonites in Ohio, but over the years they dwindled away and by 1970 they were all extinct. In 1947 about one-third of the group returned to the Wislers under the leadership of Joseph F. Martin, bishop John W. Martin's son. In 1972, they merged with the Groffdale Conference Mennonite Church (Wengers), the largest horse and buggy Mennonite church, which is mainly located in Pennsylvania, and preferred to be called "Indiana Groffdale Conference".

There is another John Martin group, that may also be called John Martin Mennonites, that left the Groffdale Conference Mennonite Church in 1993, because the Groffdale Conference had allowed the ministry to have electricity and telephones in their homes, which John Martin did not approve. Around the year 2000 there were 77 adult members of the group.
