= Gelassenheit =

Gelassenheit was a German word for tranquil submission used in the Christian mystical tradition. It has continued in English in two distinct usages:

- in Heideggerian usage, and
- in the Anabaptist tradition.
