= Donnermeyer =

Donnermeyer is a surname. Notable people with the surname include:

- Joseph Donnermeyer (born 1949), American educator and writer
- William I. Donnermeyer Sr. (1924–2025), American politician
