= Weaverland Old Order Mennonite Conference =

Mennonite denomination

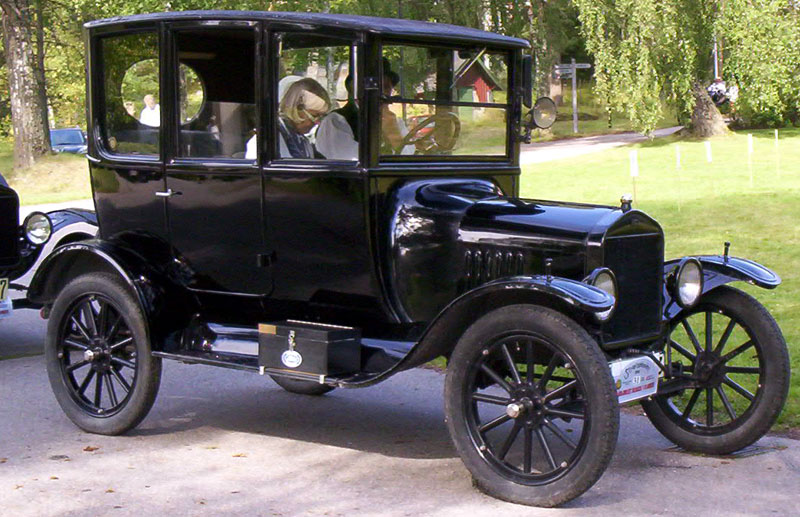
"Black bumper" car of the 1920s, such as might have been driven by early Horning Church members.

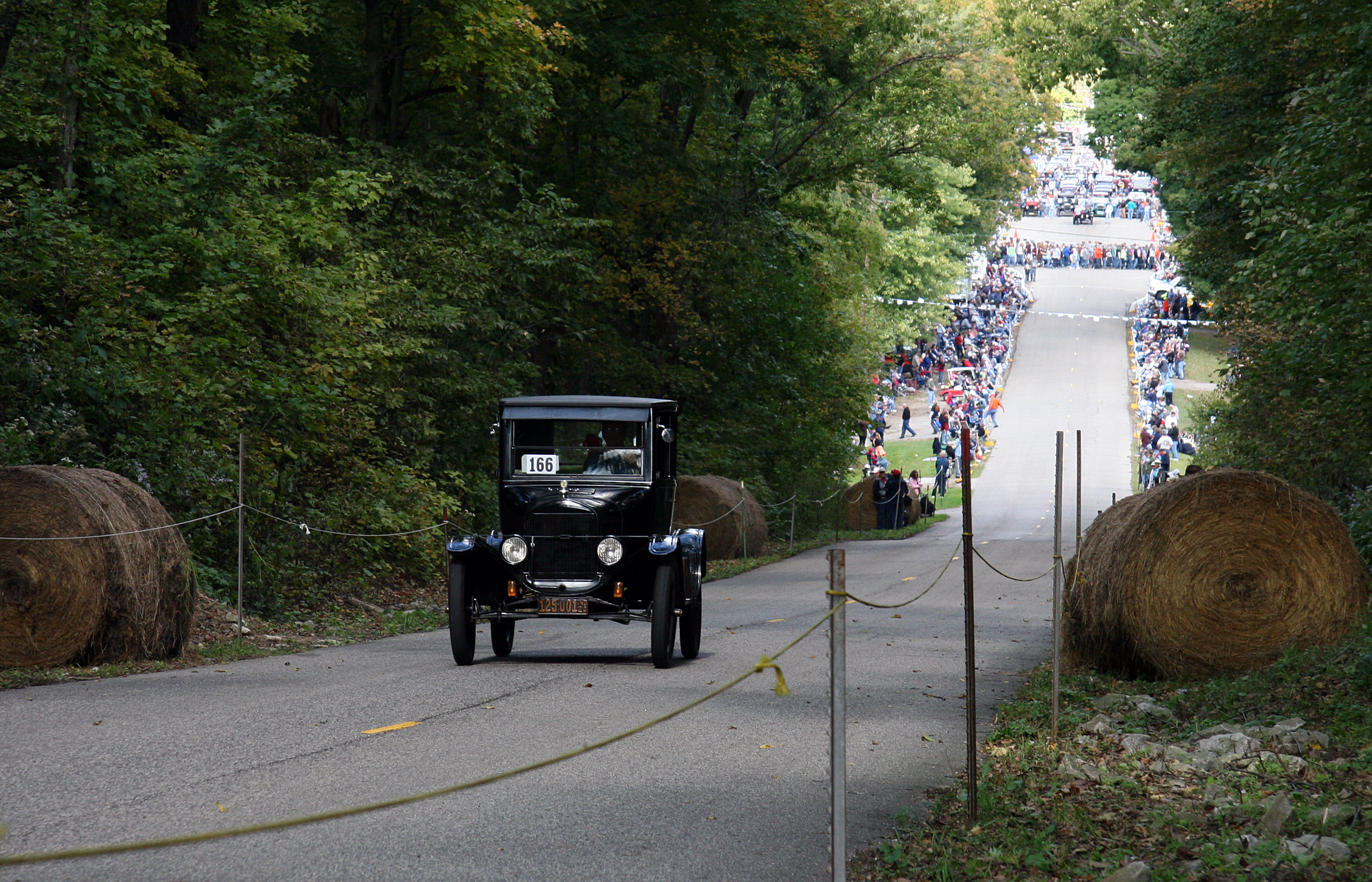
Typical American automobile from around the time of the Weaverland Mennonite schism, the Ford Model T, which is in black.

The Weaverland Conference, also called Horning Church or Black-bumper Mennonites, is a Christian denomination of Old Order Mennonites who use cars.

== Names ==
The popular name Horning Church came from Bishop Moses Horning, who owned a car bought for him by a parishioner. The group is also known as Black-bumper Mennonites for their early custom of painting over the chrome on their cars for modesty, though in the modern day this custom is mandatory only for ministers.

== History ==
The Weaverland Mennonites have their roots in the Anabaptist movement of Switzerland and Southwest Germany, including the German-speaking Alsace, that came under French rule starting in the 17th century. In the first two centuries or so this movement was known by the name Swiss Brethren but later adopted the name Mennonite.

=== Anabaptist beginnings ===
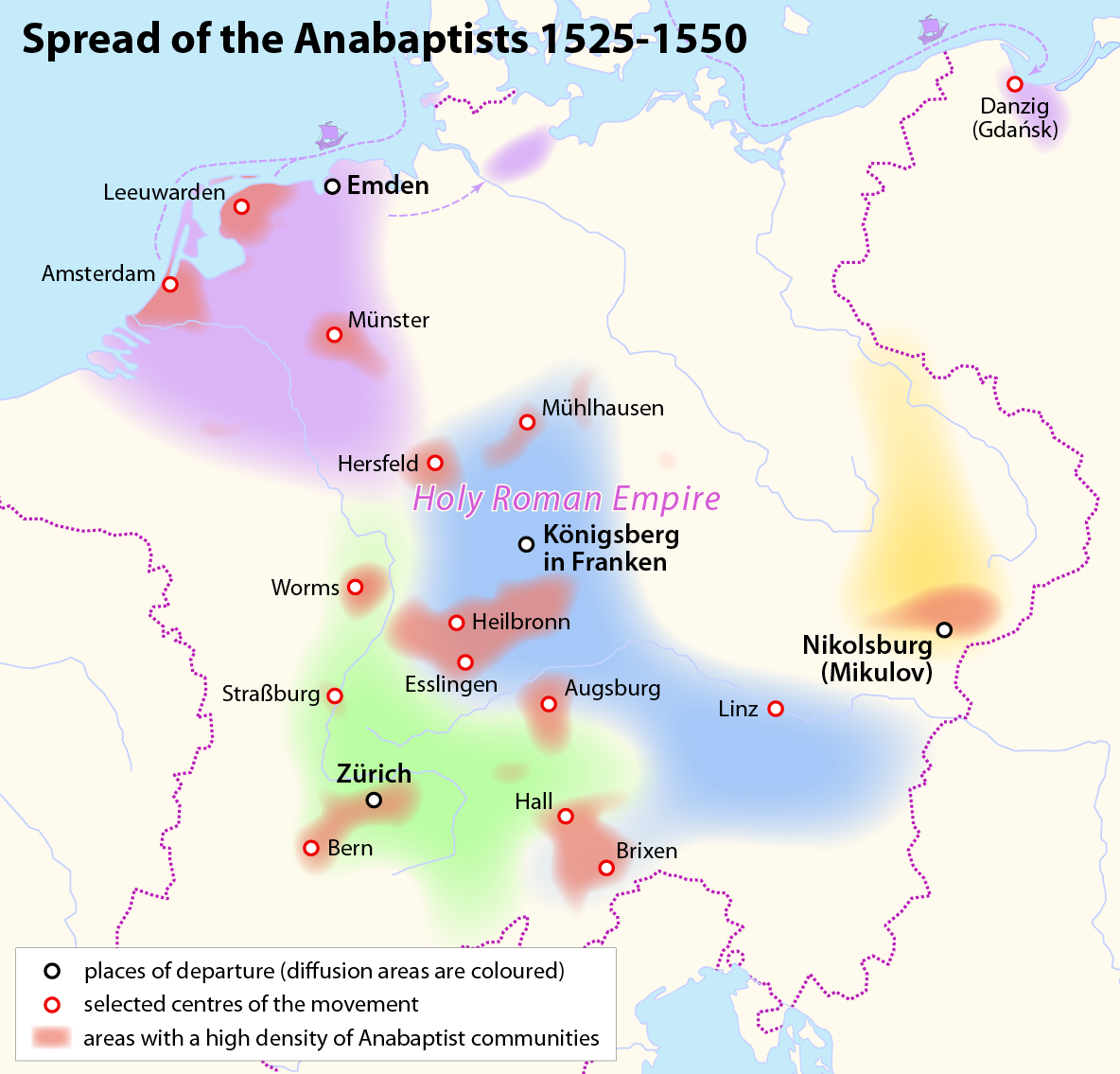
Spread of the early Anabaptists, 1525–1550

The early history of the Mennonites starts with the Anabaptists in the German and Dutch-speaking parts of central Europe. These forerunners of modern Mennonites were part of the Protestant Reformation, a broad reaction against the practices and theology of the Roman Catholic Church. Its most distinguishing feature is the rejection of infant baptism, an act that had both religious and political meaning since almost every infant born in western Europe was baptized into the Roman Catholic Church. Other significant theological views of the Mennonites developed in opposition to Roman Catholic views or to the views of other Protestant reformers such as Martin Luther and Huldrych Zwingli.

Some of the followers of Zwingli's Reformed church thought that requiring church membership beginning at birth was inconsistent with the New Testament. They believed that the church should be completely removed from government (the proto–free church tradition), and that individuals should join only when willing to publicly acknowledge belief in Jesus and the desire to live in accordance with his teachings. At a small meeting in Zurich on January 21, 1525, Conrad Grebel, Felix Manz, and George Blaurock, along with twelve others, baptized each other.

Despite strong repressive efforts of the state churches, the movement spread slowly around western Europe, primarily along the Rhine. Officials killed many of the earliest Anabaptist leaders in an attempt to purge Europe of the new sect.

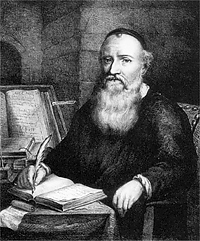
Menno Simons

In the early days of the Anabaptist movement, Menno Simons, a Catholic priest in the Low Countries, heard of the movement and started to rethink his Catholic faith. In 1536, at the age of 40, Simons left the Roman Catholic Church. He soon became a leader within the Anabaptist movement, and was wanted by authorities for the rest of his life. His name became associated with scattered groups of nonviolent Anabaptists whom he helped to organize and consolidate.

=== Migration to North America ===
In the 18th century, about 100,000 Germans mainly from the Palatinate emigrated to Pennsylvania, where they became known collectively as the Pennsylvania Dutch. Of these immigrants, around 2,500 were Mennonites and 500 were Amish. These two groups settled mainly in southeast Pennsylvania, many of them in Lancaster and the adjacent counties.

During the Colonial period, Mennonites were distinguished from other Pennsylvania Germans in three ways: their opposition to the American Revolutionary War, which other German settlers participated in on both sides; resistance to public education; and disapproval of religious revivalism. Contributions of Mennonites during this period include the idea of separation of church and state, and opposition to slavery.

From 1812 to 1860, another wave of Mennonite immigrants from Europe settled farther west in Ohio, Indiana, Illinois and Missouri. These Mennonites, along with another wave of Amish, came from Switzerland, Southwest Germany and the Alsace-Lorraine area.

=== Old Order Movement ===
The Weaverland Old Order Mennonite Conference emerged from the Old Order division, that occurred in 1893 in Lancaster County, Pennsylvania, over the question of English language preaching, Sunday Schools and other questions. The trigger for the split was a quarrel about a pulpit, that was to be installed in church instead of the traditional preacher's table.

=== Emergence of car driving Old Order Mennonites ===
There was another split in 1927 over disagreements over the use of automobiles. The Weaverland Mennonite then allowed the use of cars, but only with black bumpers. Those opposed to car usage formed a new church, the Groffdale Conference Mennonite Church, also called Wenger Mennonites. The remainder of the Weaverland Conference since then have also been known as the Horning Church because their bishop in the time of the split was Moses G. Horning (1871–1955) or "Black-bumper Mennonites" for their past custom of purchasing cars but covering up the flashy chrome with black paint. In 2013, the Meadow Springs Old Order Mennonite Church Conference in Myerstown, Pennsylvania, with 289 members and four congregations, had divided from the Weaverland Old Order Mennonite Conference. The Meadow Springs split was over disagreements on the acceptance of technology and the internet and they also wanted more conservative dress standards.

== Customs and beliefs ==
Weaverland Conference Mennonites are dressed plain. They used to speak Pennsylvania German, but it is no longer used in church services and there has generally been a shift to the English language in daily life. Older members of the church still speak Pennsylvania German when greeting an old friend or meeting a non-Plain friend that knows German/Dutch.

Ideologically this group shares many similar beliefs with Conservative Mennonites though differing in not having Sunday Schools or revival meetings. What characterize this automobile groups as Old Orders and not Conservative Mennonites is that they have retained the traditional forms of worship, communion, baptism, funeral and leadership structures. In contrast some wedding practices have changed. They identify more with the values of the Old Order groups but share common core values or distinctives.

== Membership and congregations ==
In 1927, after the Wenger Mennonites had left the congregation, there were about 500 baptized members in Weaverland Mennonite Conference and in 1957 there were 1,731 baptized members. In 1994 the number of baptized members had risen to 4,767. In 2008/9 membership was 7,100 in 40 congregations across 6 states. In 2024 the Weaverland Mennonite Conference had 56 church houses in 7 states. As of 2024, they have 32 church houses in Pennsylvania, 7 in New York, 2 in Virginia, 1 in Kentucky, 8 in Missouri, 1 in Iowa, and 5 in Wisconsin.

== Publishing ==
The Weaverland Conference publishes a number of booklets and tracts under the name Weaverland Mennonite Publications.

== See also ==
- Markham-Waterloo Mennonite Conference
- Wissler Conference
