= David Martin Mennonites =

Canadian religious group

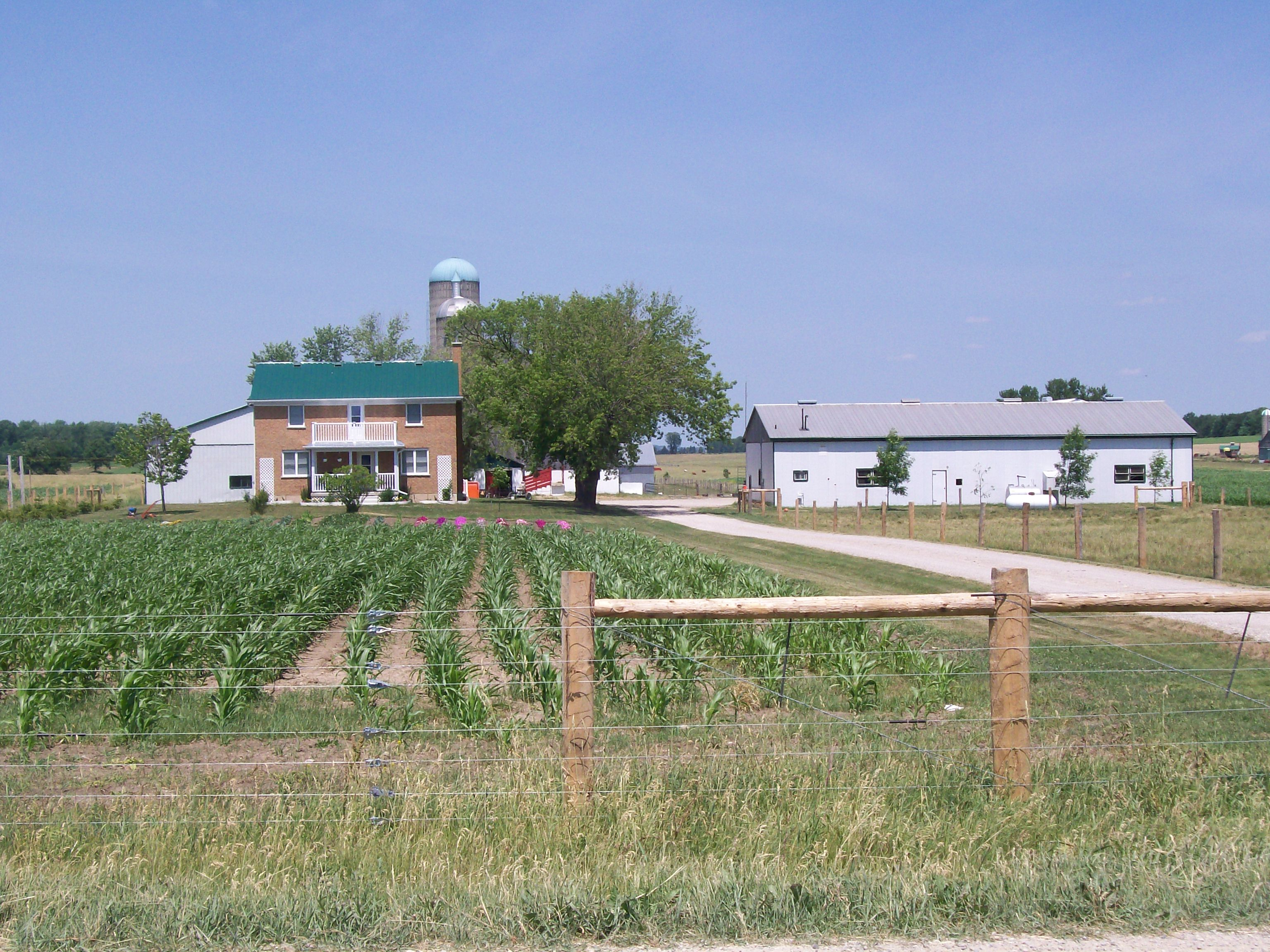
David Martin Mennonite Farm near Linwood, Ontario.

The David Martin Mennonites, officially called Independent Old Order Mennonite Church or Independent Old Order Mennonites, are a horse and buggy group of Canadian Old Order Mennonites that is moderate concerning the use of modern technologies and that emerged in 1917. They numbered about 3,500 people in 2010 and live in Wellington County, Ontario and the Waterloo Region. In 2020 they now also live in The Municipality of Grey Highlands, Simcoe County, and Township of Southgate. They do not cooperate with other Old Order groups.

== History ==
In 1917 the David Martin Mennonites emerged under the leadership of Minister David B. Martin (1838-1920) from the Old Order Mennonite Conference in Ontario, mainly concerning issues of discipline. In the next decades the young church was not without troubles and struggled to maintain its members. They used the ban on several occasions and growth was slow.

In 1954, a group of about 25 people separated from the David Martin Mennonites and in 1956 Elam S. Martin, their minister, was excommunicated from the David Martin Mennonites. This Elam Martin group with others formed the Orthodox Mennonites in 1958. Since then the David Martins adopted a policy not to talk to outsiders about their faith. "We have lost too many people", bishop David W. Martin stated. The David Martins have grown rapidly through natural increase since 1958.

In 1987, the majority of the Anson Hoover group, a subgroup of Orthodox Mennonites consisting of some 70 members, went back to the David Martin Mennonites. In 1979 the David Martins, as a group, unanimously accepted the telephone.

== Practice ==
David Martin Mennonites do not talk about their personal lives or church life, but they are open for business. They do not own automobiles but do utilize certain aspects of modern technology, such as cellphones and computers, primarily for business. Fields are tilled with horses and tractors. while stationary belt-drive diesel engines for threshing and other farm works are allowed. In their homes they have electric light, freezers, refrigerators and propane stoves are accepted. David Martin Mennonites send their children to public schools which their children attend until they are 14 years old.

== Demographics ==
In 1925 there were 55 adult members in the group. In 1942 there were 72 adult members and 92 children. In 1952 there were 89 adult members and 183 children. In the 1990s they had more than 400 adult members. Around the year 2000 the David Martin Mennonites counted about 350 households, which would mean about 2100 people. In 2010 there were about 3,500 people in the group.

== Literature ==
- Fretz, J. Winfield (1989). The Waterloo Mennonites: A Community in Paradox. Wilfrid Laurier University Press. ISBN 0-88920-985-5.
- Martin, Donald (2003). Old Order Mennonites of Ontario: Gelassenheit, Discipleship, Brotherhood. Herald Press, Waterloo, Ontario.
