= Joseph Donnermeyer =

American academic

Joseph F. Donnermeyer (born 5 December 1949) is an American academic. He is a Professor Emeritus at Ohio State University, School of Environment and Natural Resources. His main subject is rural criminology, with a focus on Amish studies, especially on change in Amish and Old Order Mennonite communities.

== Career ==
Donnermeyer completed his B.A. in 1971 from Thomas More College, Kentucky, and both his M.A. (1974) and Ph.D. (1977) from the University of Kentucky.

Donnermeyer's first appointment was as an assistant professor in the Department of Agricultural Economics at Purdue University, with primary responsibilities as a state specialist in community development. In 1979 he became assistant professor at the Department of Agricultural Economics and Rural Sociology at Ohio State University (OSU), where the National Rural Crime Prevention Center was established. In 1999 he became assistant professor in the Department of Human and Community Resource Development at the same university, where the rural sociology program was moved. In 2010, Rural Sociology was moved again to the School of Environment and Natural Resources.

Donnermeyer is also an adjunct professor at the University of New England in Armidale, New South Wales and the Center for Violence Research at West Virginia University in Morgantown, West Virginia. He is the founder and co-editor of the International Journal of Rural Criminology (IJRC), a journal co-sponsored by the International Society for the Study of Rural Crime, the Division of Rural Criminology of the American Society of Criminology, and the Rural Criminology Working Group of the European Society of Criminology. The first issue of IJRC was published in 2011, but it was only published sporadically until it became co-sponsored by the three professional groups.

Donnermeyer also founded another journal for the publication of scholarship about the Amish and related Anabaptist groups. The first journal was published through the OSU Knowledge Bank, with the inaugural issue published in 2013. This was eventually replaced by the Journal of Plain Anabaptist Communities (JPAC) in May 2019, and upgraded to the digital journal collection of OSU libraries. JPAC is now co-sponsored by the OSU libraries, the Young Center for Anabaptist and Pietist Studies at Elizabethtown College, Elizabethtown, Pennsylvania, the Amish and Mennonite Heritage Center in Berlin, Ohio, and "Amish America", a blog produced by Erik Wesner. The inaugural issue of JPAC was released in Summer 2020.

In the Autumn Semester of 2022, Donnermeyer became a visiting fellow at the Young Center for Anabaptist and Pietist Studies in Elizabethtown. His fellow lecture was entitled: "Keeping Track of Settlement and Population Growth of the Amish in North America."
