= Stauffer Mennonite =

Group of Old Order Mennonites

The Stauffer Mennonites, or "Pikers", are a group of Old Order Mennonites. They are also called "Team Mennonites", because they use horse drawn transportation. In 2015 the Stauffer Mennonites had 1,792 adult members.

== History ==
Prior to the formation of the Church in 1845, the Stauffer Mennonite Congregation was made up of one of its founders, Jacob Lehman (1723-1794) and his family.

The original church was founded in 1845 when a split occurred in the Lancaster Mennonite Conference in Lancaster County, PA. The more conservative group formed a new church called the Piker Mennonites because their meeting house stood near the “pike” U.S. Route 322 in Earl Township near Hinkletown. In 1916 the original "Pikers" split into the Stauffer Mennonites and the group around bishop John A. Weaver, called Weaver Mennonites, who are less conservative. The schism from the Bowman group in Pennsylvania was about the extent of shunning and divided the congregation 101 to 102.

While the Weaver Pike Mennonites decreased in numbers and many intermarried into the Wenger Mennonites, the Jacob Stauffer side experiences much growth after 1960s. Now, the Weaver Pike Mennonites are just a remnant group with about 10% of their starting numbers: in 2014 there were only 5 or 6 members remaining.

The Stauffer Pike Mennonites and Weaver Pike Mennonites continue to share the same church building, alternating every Sunday. The original church building, built in 1840, was demolished in late 2016 and already replaced in 2015 with a nearly identical building 75 yards farther from Route 322 behind the horsesheds. The reasons were that understandable church services were harder to perform under the traffic conditions of nearby Rt. 322.

However, a very small section of stone wall that was part of the original structure remains standing indicating where the historic structure once stood. On the same ground the Stauffer Mennonites still use a century-old horse barn beside their normal sheds. This building is the only left over from the past.

Today the name "Stauffer Mennonite" in a broad sense can refer to at least nine different groups, all descending from the church that was founded in 1845. The groups are named after the bishop who founded the group: Jacob Stauffer, Phares Stauffer, Joseph Brubaker, Noah Hoover, Titus Hoover, Aaron Martin, Allen Martin (dissolved), Martin Weaver, and Jonas Weaver groups. Today the Noah Hoovers are mostly counted as a separate group.

In general all of Pike Mennonite groups up to 2016 held to orthodox Mennonite beliefs, strictly Plain dress and forbade cars and modern farm machinery. Shunning was practiced in a stricter way than among other Old Order Mennonite groups.

In 2016, the Stauffer Pike Mennonite community experienced a split primarily centered on the issue of insurance. Bishop Arthur Martin of Snyder County became a leading figure in the split. After being expelled and later reinstated by a supportive Missouri bishop, Martin refused to deny Communion to members who carried certain forms of insurance. The inclusion of English preaching in services also played a factor.

The new congregation calls itself Riverview Old Order Mennonite Church, Snyder County Conference. It is estimated that up to 40% of former Stauffer members joined this new body. As with other newly formed Mennonite fellowships, the group went through a period of consolidation, during which some families joined more liberal churches that permit automobile use, while others returned to the parent Stauffer group.

In Illinois, the Vandalia congregation affiliated with the newly established Midwest Old Order Mennonite Conference, itself a 2018 offshoot of the Wenger Mennonites. The Snyder County faction has also attempted to affiliate with the Midwest Conference, though disagreements remain, particularly regarding attitudes toward youth behavior. Traditional Pike practice generally tolerated youthful misbehavior prior to baptism, whereas the Wenger Conference and its affiliated groups opposed such leniency and promoted stricter standards.

The Riverview group has also shown more liberal tendencies in worship, including preaching partially in English and incorporating English-language hymns. These practices distinguish it from other conservative Old Order groups and suggest a move away from traditional Pike Mennonite norms. Although automobiles remain formally prohibited, some members have expressed interest in joining Fellowship or Conservative Mennonite churches where car ownership is accepted.

The 2016 split had little to no impact in Lancaster County, where the ministry remained united. In Illinois, however, it had a greater effect: most families left the Stauffer group to join the Arthur Martin faction and ultimately affiliated with the Midwest Conference.

The main Stauffer Mennonite church has taken a long time to use shunning on members who drifted to this side, in the hope of their return, but finally the "Bann und Meidung" was declared.

== Customs and beliefs ==
As of 2010, these groups are among the most conservative of all Mennonites of Swiss and south German ancestry outside the Amish. They stress strict separation from “the world”, avoid excommunicated members (shunning), wear very plain clothing, and do not have electricity or running water. Stauffer Mennonites in general do not wear beards, with the exception of the Noah Hoover Mennonites, who are now considered not to be part of the Stauffer Mennonites in a narrow sense, but of the larger Horse and Buggy Old Order Mennonite movement which formed from later schisms.

Stauffer Mennonite youth are oftentimes known as "wilde Pikers", as there is a higher tendency among them "sowing their oats" before joining church or not joining at all. The local term "Rumspringe" (meaning "jumping around, running around") oftentimes associated with the Amish youth in the same age, defines also for them a time when young people are not baptised yet, but almost adults and have to decide between joining the church (after some experience of the so-called world) or not joining at all. The young Stauffer Mennonites are known to have a higher degree of people not joining church and getting cars while young people and finally leave their upbringing church. Other Old Order Mennonites in the same area, especially Wenger Mennonites are rather known as "tame" young people (zahme, junge Leit). These descriptions are very much valid for the Lancaster County settlement.

Dresses of Stauffer Mennonite women very much resemble Amish unicolor dresses, in many cases even identical, but normally they are small flowered in comparison to Wenger Mennonite women´s bigger flowered dresses. Hat brims of men are broader.

== Congregations and baptized members ==
Year	Members
1936	161
1959	218
1977	382
1990	700
2008	1,300
2015	1,792
2020	1,631

In 1936 the Stauffer Mennonites had 161 baptized members. In 1959 there were 2 congregations with 218 adult members. In 1977 there were 382 members and in 1990 about 700. In 2008 there were 13 Stauffer Mennonite congregations with about 1300 adult members. In 2015 there were 17 Stauffer Mennonite congregations with 1792 baptized members and a total population of 4,076.

The Overview for US states shows these memberships according to the 2015 Directory:

US-State	Settlement/Siedlung	Congregations/Gemeinden	Members/Getaufte	Population/ Gemeindeleute
Illinois	1	1	77	238
Kentucky	1	1	37	85
Maryland	1	2	229	527
Minnesota	1	1	13	27
Missouri	2	2	158	372
New York	2	2	87	261
Ohio	1	2	259	555
Pennsylvania	3	6	932	2,011
Virginia	0	0	0	0
total/gesamt	12	17	1792	4076

Source: Records of Members of the Stauffer Mennonite Church at the Present Time, 2015

The Stauffer Mennonite Directory of 2015 does not include the growth up to the end of 2016, when the split happened. It is assumable the church grew up to 1890 members until Dec. 2016..

According to the newest Stauffer Mennonite church Directory of 2020 their numbers are as follows:

US-State	Settlement/Siedlung	Congregations/Gemeinden	Members/Getaufte	Population/ Gemeindeleute
Illinois	1	1	29	94
Kentucky	1	1	34	113
Maryland	1	2	253	623
Minnesota	1	1	26	54
Missouri	2	2	211	442
New York	2	2	130	368
Ohio	1	2	230	566
Pennsylvania	3	6	708	1,448
Virginia	1	1	10	32
TOTAL/gesamt	12	17	1,631	3,740

Source: Records of Members of the Stauffer Mennonite Church at the Present Time, 2020

Comparing both Directories, one can see which settlement was affected hard by the split and which hardly or not at all:

US-State	Settlement/Siedlung	Congregations/Gemeinden	Members/Getaufte 2015	Members/Getaufte 2020	Difference/ Unterschied 2015-2020	Population/ Gemeindeleute 2015	Population/ Gemeindeleute 2020	Difference / Unterschied 2015-2020
Illinois	1	1	77	29	48	238	95	144
Kentucky	1	1	37	34	3	85	113	+ 28
Maryland	1	2	229	253	+ 24	527	623	+ 96
Minnesota	1	1	23	26	+ 13	27	54	+27
Missouri	2	2	158	211	+ 68	372	442	+70
New York	2	2	87	130	+ 43	261	368	+ 107
Ohio	1	2	259	230	29	555	566	+11
Pennsylvania	3	6	932	708	224	2,011	1,448	573
Virginia	1	1	0	10	+10	0	32	+ 32
TOTAL/gesamt	12	17	1,792	1,631	161	4076	3740	-336

Source: Records of Members of the Stauffer Mennonite Church at the Present Time, 2020

A growth of population in a state, despite membership losses, would identify young settlements where many children are born of young member families in the twenties.

The loss of 161 members between 2015 and 2020 does not show the real loss of members. To some extent internal growth has outgrown the losses, so that one can assume if appr. 1890 members at the end of 2016 at least 10 % should be counted countrywide as losses. In the Snyder County settlement it meant for Riverview that almost 40 % went with the splitting side. In Illinois the loss is still very much recognizable, as the congregation shrank immensely, one can assume at least 2/3 split off in late 2016 up to early 2017. In 2020 this is still comparable by now having 29 members and in 2016 there were 77 members. These 29 members now are to some extent the result of internal growth since the end of 2016, those 77 members grew probably up to 80 to the end of 2016 when the split happened.

For actual numbers one should know how many people and members the Stauffer Mennonitengemeinde had just before the exodus of hundreds, or who were later shunned, as the church was hesitant in practising it immediately.

== See also ==
- Groffdale Conference Mennonite Church

== Literature ==
- Scott, Stephen (1996), An Introduction to Old Order and Conservative Mennonite Groups, Intercourse, Pennsylvania: Good Books, ISBN 1-56148-101-7
