= Donald Kraybill =

American author and educator

- Born: 1945 (age 80–81); Mount Joy, Pennsylvania
- Occupations: Educator, author
- Known for: Research and writing about Anabaptist groups, in particular the Amish

Academic background
- Education: PhD Sociology, Temple University
- Influences: John Hostetler

Academic work
- Institutions: Elizabethtown College

Donald B. Kraybill (born 1945) is an American author, lecturer, and educator on Anabaptist faiths and culture. Kraybill is widely recognized for his studies on Anabaptist groups and in particular the Amish. He has researched and written extensively on Anabaptist culture. He is Distinguished Professor Emeritus at Elizabethtown College and Senior Fellow Emeritus at Elizabethtown's Young Center for Anabaptist and Pietist Studies.

== Early life and education ==
Kraybill was born in Mount Joy, Pennsylvania, in 1945 to a Mennonite family and grew up on dairy farms in Mount Joy, Lampeter and Morgantown. His surname Kraybill is a form of the name Graybill which is a typical Mennonite and Amish name, first recorded in America in 1728. He graduated from Lancaster Mennonite High School in 1963. After attending Millersville University for two years, he received a bachelor's degree from Eastern Mennonite University in 1967, a master's degree from Temple University in 1971, and a PhD in sociology from Temple University in 1976. At Temple he was a research assistant to John Hostetler, a recognized authority on Amish society who had himself grown up Amish and who was influential in Kraybill's interest in studying the groups.

== Career ==
Kraybill served for five years as an associate pastor in Lancaster County, Pennsylvania, at the Willow Street Mennonite Church and served four years as the associate director of Mennonite Voluntary Service as a conscientious objector.

He started teaching sociology at Elizabethtown College in 1971. From 1979 to 1985 he chaired the Sociology and Social Work Department and from 1989 to 1996 was director of the Young Center for Anabaptist and Pietist Studies at Elizabethtown. In 1994 the school appointed him to a named chair, the Carl W. Ziegler Professor of Religion and History. He was provost of Messiah College from 1996 to 2002 before returning to Elizabethtown in 2003.

In October 2005, Young Center was awarded a $100,000 grant from the National Endowment for the Humanities for a three-year collaborative research project entitled "Amish Diversity and Identity: Transformations in 20th Century America". In addition to Kraybill as senior investigator, the investigative team included Steven Nolt, a professor of history at Goshen College in Indiana, and Karen Johnson-Weiner, a professor of anthropology at the State University of New York at Potsdam. A national panel of seven scholars advised the research team throughout the project.

The NEH grant enabled the researchers to investigate the Amish experience at the national level, giving attention to geographic expansion, the growth of diversity, changing conceptions of identity and evolving patterns of interaction with the larger society. The team also explored how the Amish have contributed to shaping the identity of a nation that made exceptions in the areas of education, Social Security, and child labor for a religious minority living on its cultural margins. The project resulted in a website; an international conference, The Amish in America: New Identities and Diversities, held in 2007; and a book, The Amish.

Kraybill is Distinguished Professor Emeritus at Elizabethtown College and Senior Fellow Emeritus at the Young Center for Anabaptist and Pietist Studies. He is widely recognized for his studies and expertise on Anabaptist groups and in particular the Amish.

Kraybill retired in 2015 and planned to continue his research in his retirement. He was succeeded as director of the Young Center after his retirement by Nolt. Elizabethtown College holds his papers in their Earl H. and Anita F. Hess Archives and Special Collections.

== Works ==
Kraybill has authored or edited nearly 30 books on various aspects of the lives of Plain sects. He writes almost exclusively on the groups within the Anabaptist faith such as the Mennonites, Amish, and Bruderhof. In addition to academic books — largely published by Johns Hopkins University Press — he also writes popular books sold in gift shops to tourists, interested in learning more about the plain sects. He is one of two experts frequently quoted by reporters to give background to news stories involving the Amish. He also served as a consultant for the PBS show The American Experience series The Amish.

Book projects include Amish Grace: How Forgiveness Transcended Tragedy (Jossey-Bass, 2007), a discussion of the Amish response to the school shooting at Nickel Mines, and The Amish Way: Patient Faith in a Perilous World (Jossey-Bass, 2010), an exploration of Amish spiritual life and practices, both with coauthors Steven M. Nolt and David L. Weaver-Zercher. Kraybill also authored Concise Encyclopedia of Amish, Brethren, Hutterites, and Mennonites (Johns Hopkins University Press, 2010), which provides basic information about these four Anabaptist groups in North America, and coauthored (with Karen M. Johhson-Weiner and Steven M. Nolt) The Amish, a comprehensive description and analysis of Amish life and culture.

In 2014 he published a book related to five beard-cutting attacks on Amish people in eastern Ohio in the fall of 2011, which led to the arrests of sixteen members of a maverick Amish community in Bergholz, Ohio. Kraybill assisted federal prosecutors in understanding Amish beliefs and practices and served as an expert witness at the federal trial in 2012. He wrote a book about the attacks, investigation, trial, and aftermath: Renegade Amish: Beard Cutting, Hate Crimes, and the Trial of the Bergholz Barbers. In August 2014, the Sixth Circuit Court of Appeals overturned the hate crimes convictions, a ruling that generated much response.

Kraybill was selected to research and write a centennial history of Eastern Mennonite University, his alma mater, that was published in 2017. In 2021 he wrote What The Amish Teach Us published by Johns Hopkins University Press, and simultaneously released a podcast What I Learned From The Amish with producer Elizabethtown College student Eric Schubert.

=== Bibliography ===
- Our Star-Spangled Faith, 1976. ISBN 0-8361-1797-2
- Puzzles of Amish Life, 1990. ISBN 1-56148-001-0
- Old Order Amish: Their Enduring Way of Life (with Lucian Niemeyer), 1993. ISBN 0-8018-4426-6
- The Amish Struggle With Modernity (Co-edited with Marc Alan Olshan), 1994. ISBN 0-87451-684-6
- The Riddles of Human Society (with Conrad L. Kanagy), 1999. ISBN 0-7619-8562-X
- The Riddle of Amish Culture, 2001. ISBN 0-8018-6772-X
- Anabaptist World USA (with C. Nelson Hostetter), 2001. ISBN 0-8361-9163-3
- On the Backroad to Heaven: Old Order Hutterites, Mennonites, Amish, and Brethren (co-author: Carl Bowman), 2001. ISBN 0-8018-6565-4
- The Upside-Down Kingdom, 2003. ISBN 0-8361-9236-2
- The Amish: Why They Enchant Us, 2003. ISBN 0-8361-9241-9
- Who Are the Anabaptists: Amish, Brethren, Hutterites, and Mennonites, 2003. ISBN 0-8361-9242-7
- The Amish and the State, 2003. ISBN 0-8018-7236-7
- Amish Enterprise: From Plows to Profits (with Steven M. Nolt), 2004. ISBN 0-8018-7805-5
- Amish Grace: How Forgiveness Transcended Tragedy (with Steven M. Nolt and David L. Weaver-Zercher), 2007. ISBN 0-7879-9761-7.
- The Amish of Lancaster County (with photography by Daniel Rodriguez), 2008. ISBN 0-8117-3478-1.
- The Amish Way: Patient Faith in a Perilous World (with Steven M. Nolt and David L. Weaver-Zercher), 2010. ISBN 0-470-52069-8.
- Concise Encyclopedia of Amish, Brethren, Hutterites, and Mennonites, 2010. ISBN 0-8018-9657-6.
- The Amish (with Karen M Johnson-Weiner and Steven M Nolt), 2013 ISBN 1-4214-0914-3.
- Renegade Amish: Beard Cutting, Hate Crimes, and the Trial of the Bergholz Amish, 2014. ISBN 1-4214-1567-4.

== Personal life ==
Kraybill lives in Elizabethtown, Pennsylvania, with his wife. He and his wife are members of Elizabethtown Church of the Brethren.

== See also ==
- D. Holmes Morton, medical researcher of genetic disorders common among Amish
