= Old Order Mennonite =

Christian denomination

Old Order Mennonites
Total population
- 72,000–84,000 (2021)

Founder
- Jacob Wisler

Regions with significant populations
- North America (notably Pennsylvania, Ontario, New York, Kentucky, Wisconsin, Minnesota and Ohio) and South America

Religions
- Anabaptist

Scriptures
- The Bible

Languages
- Pennsylvania German, English, Plautdietsch

Old Order Mennonites (Pennsylvania German: Fuhremennischte) form a branch of the Mennonite tradition. Old Order are those Mennonite groups of Swiss German and south German heritage who practice a lifestyle without some elements of modern technology, wear plain dress, and have retained the old forms of worship, baptism and communion. A majority of Old Order Mennonite still drive a horse and buggy, whereas a large minority use cars.

All Old Order Mennonites reject certain technologies (e.g., radio, television, Internet), but the extent of this rejection depends on the individual group. Old Order groups generally place great emphasis on a disciplined community instead of the individual's personal faith beliefs. The Pennsylvania German language is spoken vigorously among all horse-and-buggy groups except the Virginia Old Order Mennonites, who lost their original language before becoming Old Order. There is no overall church or conference to unite all the different groups of Old Order Mennonites. In 2008–2009, a minority of Old Order Mennonites accepted automobiles, whereas a majority retain horse and buggy transportation.

The total population of Old Order Mennonites can be estimated to be between 72,000 and 84,000 in 2021.

== Names ==
From the first Old Order division in Indiana in 1872 under bishop Jacob Wisler (1808–1889) until the middle of the 20th century, all Old Order Mennonites were called by many "Wisler Mennonites," "Old Order Mennonites, Wisler," even "Wislerites," or the like. In a few cases this usage has persisted, but today the term "Wisler Mennonites" normally refers to a certain subgroup, the Ohio-Indiana Mennonite Conference.

Old Order Mennonites who do not use automobiles are either referred to as "horse and buggy Mennonites" or "team Mennonites" (the word for them in Pennsylvania German is Fuhremennischte). Sometimes the term "Old Order Mennonites" is restricted to groups that do not use cars. "Automobile" Old Order Mennonites refer to those who split from horse-and-buggy Old Order groups. It is common to name groups after a bishop, in most cases the leading bishop during the time of division.

Plautdietsch-speaking Russian Mennonites, particularly those termed Old Colony Mennonites, are considered Old Order Mennonites, though their origins are from Chortitza Colony. A number of Old Order Mennonites from North America travel to Mexico to support the Old Colony Mennonite parochial schools there, serving as teachers.

== History ==
=== 19th century ===
In the second half of the 19th century, the Old Order Movement emerged among Anabaptists of South German and Swiss origin in North America who spoke mostly Pennsylvania German (also known as Pennsylvania Dutch). Most "Old Order" Mennonites emerged through divisions from the main body of Mennonites between 1872 and 1901 in four regions of North America: Indiana in 1872, Ontario in 1889, Pennsylvania in 1893 and Virginia in 1901.

Conflicts over the introduction of such modern practices as Sunday Schools, revival meetings, and English-language preaching drove the formation of Old Order Mennonite churches. At that time controversies over the use of modern technologies did not yet play a role in these divisions.

The modernizing trends that changed the form of religious practice were pushed among the Mennonites especially by two men: John F. Funk and John S. Coffman. The traditionally minded people left the old conferences to form new ones, but not the modernizers.

The Stauffer Mennonites had already split away in 1845 over several issues, favoring a stricter church practice. Today they, and groups that split from them, are the most traditional Old Order Mennonite groups concerning technologies and dress.

The Reformed Mennonites, formed in 1812, are a special group that does not totally fit into the "Old Order" group but that has best retained some old traditions, e. g. they wear the most traditional form of plain dress among all Mennonites. Concerns that led to the formation of the new group were "the worldly drift of the church" and "degeneration".

According to a 2017 report,

"there are two basic strains of Mennonites in Canada: the Swiss-South German Mennonites came via Pennsylvania, and the Dutch-North German Mennonites came via Russia (Ukraine). In the late 1700s and early 1800s "Swiss" Mennonites from Pennsylvania settled in southern Ontario. In the 1870s, a large group of "Russian" Mennonites from Ukraine moved to southern Manitoba. Further waves of "Russian" Mennonites came to Canada in the 1920s and 1940s". In the last 50 years, Mennonites have been coming to Canada from Mexico.

The majority today are not of the Old Order.

=== 20th century ===
Between 1907 and 1931 another wave of church splits occurred among the Old Orders, concerning the use of new technologies, especially cars. The splits occurred in Indiana and Ohio in 1907, in Ontario in 1931, and in Pennsylvania in 1927, generally dividing them into the groups called horse and buggy and automobile.

Between the 1940s and the 1960s, both the Orthodox Mennonites and the Noah Hoover Mennonites emerged from a long series of splits and reunifications of people among the Old Orders who were not modernizers but sought a purer form of Mennonite life. Both the Orthodox Mennonites and the Noah Hoovers are "intentionalist-minded, ultra-plain Old Order Mennonite" groups. Stephen Scott writes the following about the Noah Hoover Mennonite:

Many people from various backgrounds have been attracted to the Noah Hoover group. The ultra-conservative stance on technology combined with firm Biblicism, intense spirituality and high moral standards have had a wide appeal.

== Beliefs and practices ==
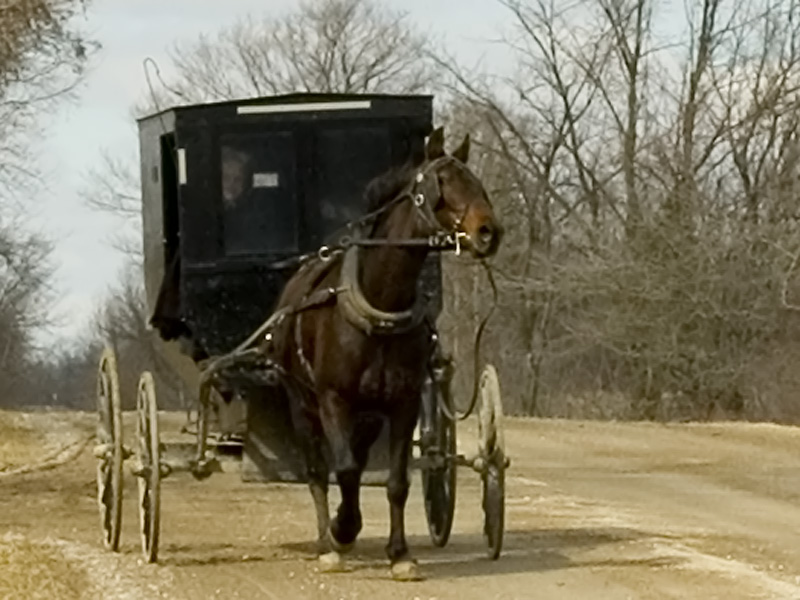
Old Order Mennonite horse and carriage in Oxford County, Ontario, in 2006.

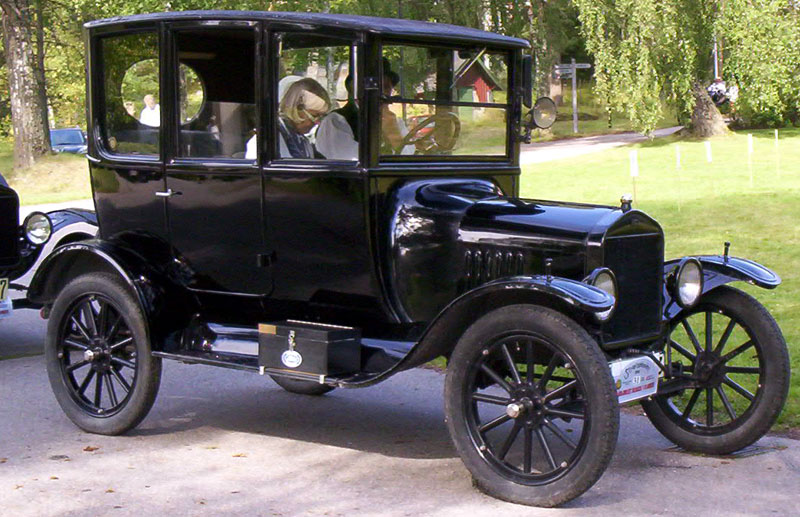
"Black bumper" car of the 1920s, such as might have been driven by early Horning Church members.

Many practices among the Old Order Mennonites stem from the biblical principle of nonconformity to the world, according to Romans 12:2 and other Bible verses.

The avoidance of technologies by Old Order Mennonites and Old Order Amish is based not on a belief that the technology is in some way evil, but over a concern for the nature of their communities. Community is important to a Mennonite, and a technology or practice is rejected if it would adversely affect it.

Many Old Order Mennonite groups reject automobiles but in an emergency even the most traditional Old Order Mennonite is likely to accept a ride in an automobile; those who sell milk in areas that require cooling will install electricity in the barn. Some of the groups that allow the use of cars and trucks, such as the Markham-Waterloo Mennonite Conference, will ensure that they are all black, even painting over chromed sections to achieve this effect.

Old Order Mennonites also practise plainness, including the dress, which is the opposite of showiness in clothing but also in physical appearance. Some Old Order Mennonites such as the Dave Martin group look in appearance very similar to the Old Order Amish as they only wear solid, dark colors, where as your average Old Order Mennonites will wear floral patterns and other patterns that are similar, but they will not wear anything that’s too bold. Women wear a cape dress, and men wear a shirt and suspenders. For church, the men will wear a coat that is most often black or a similar color. Regarding hair, women wear it in a tight bun with a prayer Kapp on top of the bun, as it is considered a sin for women to not cover their head.

Many Amish and Old Order Mennonites do not use traditional health insurance with monthly premiums copayments. In Lancaster County, Pennsylvania, some Amish and Mennonites use Preferred Health Care (PHC) Old Order Group coverage (OOG). When an OOG member visits a participating provider (approximately 1100 local physicians and 9 hospitals in the Lancaster area accept the OOG coverage), they present a unique white card with red and blue print identifying them as a PHC member. These cards are void of any identifying information, as is the custom of their religious belief. After care is rendered, providers submit a claim to PHC for a "repricing" as if the patient had insurance. A PHC statement is then sent to the medical practice and the patient indicating the discounted amount due the provider. The practice then collects the repriced amount from the patient directly, as per practice policy for collecting balances due on self-pay patient accounts. In this way, the Old Order Group has engaged in collective bargaining practices to lower their cost of health care. Additionally, the community will support any member who is sick, disadvantaged, old, or who has suffered an accident.

Old Order Mennonites and Old Order Amish groups are often grouped together in North America's popular press. This is incorrect, according to a 2017 report by Canadian Mennonite magazine:

The customs of Old Order Mennonites, the Amish communities and Old Colony Mennonites have a number of similarities, but the cultural differences are significant enough so that members of one group would not feel comfortable moving to another group. The Old Order Mennonites and Amish have the same European roots and the language spoken in their homes is the same German dialect. Old Colony Mennonites use Low German, a different German dialect.

Unlike most Old Order Amish, Old Order Mennonites have meeting houses for worship, typically of very simple design and lacking adornment. In many respects especially car driving Old Order Mennonite groups are quite similar to Conservative Mennonites but differ particularly in their non-acceptance of Sunday School and Revival Meetings, whereas horse and buggy Mennonites additionally retained use of the German language in everyday life and in their worship services.

The spectrum of Old Order Mennonite groups ranges from those that differ little from even conservative Old Order Amish groups like the Swartzentruber Amish to those that are barely different from Conservative Mennonite groups concerning the use of technologies.

What characterizes automobile groups as Old Order rather than Conservative Mennonite is their retention of traditional forms of worship, communion, baptism, funeral and leadership structures. By contrast, some wedding practices have changed. The Old Order Mennonites normally have neither Sunday schools nor revival meetings.

Horse-and-buggy groups have retained a rural lifestyle, with farming as an important part of their economy. Most horse-and-buggy Old Order Mennonites allow the use of tractors for farming, although some groups insist on steel-wheeled tractors to prevent their being used for road transportation. Some traditional groups, like the Orthodox Mennonites and the Noah Hoover Mennonites, still till their fields with horses. The horse-and-buggy people stress separation from the world, excommunicate, and normally shun in a strict manner. All Old Order Mennonite groups meet in meeting houses or church buildings (when they have full-fledged congregations), contrary to the Old Order Amish, who meet in the homes or barns of their members.

Progressive ("automobile") Old Order Mennonites, like the Weaverland Conference Mennonites (USA), Wisler Mennonites (USA), and Markham-Waterloo Mennonite Conference (Canada), largely evolved from the same series of Old Order schisms from 1872 to 1901. Nowadays, they often share the same meeting houses with and adhere to almost identical forms of Old Order worship as their horse-and-buggy Old Order brethren with whom they parted ways in the early 20th century.

Although Weaverland Old Orders began using cars in 1927, the cars were required to be plain and painted black. The form of the ban among progressive groups in general is less severe, which means an ex-communicant is not always shunned and is, therefore, not excluded from the family table, shunned by their spouse and/or cut off from business dealings. All progressive Old Orders have either already shifted from Pennsylvania German to English or are in the process to do so. In recent decades, however, family sizes and growth rates of the progressive groups have diminished compared to the horse-and-buggy groups.

According to a University of Waterloo report of 2017, "of the estimated 59,000 Mennonites in Ontario, only about twenty percent are members of conservative groups".

=== Controversy ===
In November 2020, during the COVID-19 pandemic in Ontario, Canada, both the Region of Waterloo Public Health unit and Wellington-Dufferin-Guelph Public Health issued orders to close Old Order schools and places of worship in their regions and to limit social interactions. In Waterloo Region, the orders applied to sects "including Markham, Old Colony, and David Martin Mennonite communities", according to a news report.

Both agencies cited a lack of cooperation with public health requirements that were intended to minimize the spread of the virus. In an interview with the Waterloo Region Record, bishop Peter Brubacher, (bishop "for seven Old Order Mennonite church districts" in north Waterloo Region, according to another news agency), made this comment: "I guess to be frank and honest, a lot of people really didn’t take it that serious, to isolate".

== Subgroups ==
The table below lists all groups with more than 250 members in 2008–2009 and in 2018-2019, if available.

Name	Country	Members in 1993	Members in 2008/09	Congre- gations in 2008/09	Members in 2018/19	Popu- lation in 2018/19	Congre- gations in 2018/19	Use of cars	First language among members
Groffdale Conference Mennonite Church, "Wenger"	USA	(Note: 1992)5,464	10,000	50	-	24,060	55	No	Pennsylvania German
Weaverland Mennonite Conference, "Horning"	USA	(Note: 1994)4,767	7,100	40	-	-	-	Yes	English, some older members still speak Pennsylvania German to friends
Ontario (Old Order) Mennonite Conference, "Woolwichers"	Canada	2,200	3,200	36	3,735	6,831	47	No	Pennsylvania German
Markham-Waterloo Mennonite Conference	Canada	1,106	1,400	12	-	-	-	Yes	English
Stauffer Mennonite, "Pikers"	USA	(Note: Estimate for 1990)700	1,300	13	1,631	3,740	17	No	Pennsylvania German
Ohio-Indiana Mennonite Conference, "Wisler"	USA	637	925	7	-	-	-	Yes	English
Orthodox Mennonites	USA, Canada	(Note: Estimate)220	650	8	-	-	-	No	Pennsylvania German
Noah Hoover Mennonite, "Scottsville Mennonites"	USA, Belize	300	575	8	770	1,755	9	No	Pennsylvania German, Plautdietsch, English
David Martin Mennonites or Independent Old Order Mennonites	Canada	400	(Note: This number is probably too low and should be around 800)500	6	-	-	-	No	Pennsylvania German
Virginia Old Order Mennonite Conference	USA	400	500	4	-	452	-	No	English
Reidenbach Old Order Mennonites, "Thirty Fivers"	USA	300	375	10	371	-	20	No	Pennsylvania German
Reformed Mennonite	USA, Canada	346	300	12	-	-	-	Yes	English
John Dan Wenger Mennonites	USA	250	300	1	-	-	-	No	English
	Total	17,090	27,075	206	-	-	-	-	-
Notes:

In addition to the groups listed above there were also several smaller horse-and-buggy groups like the Joseph Brubaker group with 58 adult members, the William Weaver group with 55 adult members, the Aaron Martin group with 45 adult members, the Allen Martin group with 37 adult members, and the Wellesley Orthodox group with about 20 members (this information dates from 1995). Kraybill and Bowman in 2001 mention one more small group, the Harvey Nolt group, divided from the Wengers.

Because splits, mergers and even the dissolution of small groups are not uncommon among Old Order Mennonites, the situation today may look quite different.

The Old Colony Mennonites are an Old Order Mennonite group that is spread across various parts of South America and North America. There are over 60,000 Old Colony Mennonites in Bolivia alone.

== Population and distribution ==
Horse-and-buggy (or "team") Old Order Mennonites can be found in the United States, Canada, and Belize. In the year 2000 more than 70 percent of the horse-and-buggy people lived in Pennsylvania and Ontario, where they emerged through divisions from the main body of Mennonites in the late 19th century and from the division between automobile and horse-and-buggy groups in the early 20th century.

In Indiana, Ohio and Virginia they also emerged through divisions, but in much smaller numbers. Settlements of horse-and-buggy Mennonites in other states were created by migrations, that started mainly since the 1960s. There are also Old Order Mennonites in Belize (Cayo and Toledo Districts). The table on the right lists the total population of horse-and-buggy Mennonites per U.S. state, Canadian province or Belize in North America in the late 1990s and the 2015 number of Pennsylvania German speaking Mennonites that is almost identical with the number of horse-and-buggy Mennonites.

Country (Belize), state (U.S.) or province (Canada)	Team Mennonite population around 2000	PG-speaking Mennonite population in 2015
Pennsylvania	9,650	12,340
Ontario	6,900	9,495
New York	1,800	4,195
Kentucky	400	2,563
Wisconsin	800	2,395
Ohio	800	2,360
Missouri	1,000	2,267
Virginia	1,550	~2,000 (Note: Virginia Old Order Mennonites use horse and buggy but speak English instead of German.)
Indiana	700	995
Iowa	300	600
Tennessee	–	565
Maryland	–	525
Michigan	100	300
Belize	100	300 (Note: Because some of the Noah Hoovers speak Plautdietsch instead of Pennsylvania German, the number given is maybe only half or a third of their total population.)
Illinois	–	235
Manitoba	–	100
Minnesota	-	27
Total	24,000	39,265

=== Adherents ===
According to C. Henry Smith, who wrote in 1908, all Old Order Mennonite groups counted "hardly more than two thousand members". In 1957 the total number of members of all Old Order Mennonite groups was 5,800 members in 44 congregations. For the year 2001 Kraybill and Hostetter give the number 16,478 for the membership of "all Old Order Mennonites groups" in the USA. According to the Global Anabaptist Mennonite Encyclopedia in 2002 there were approximately 17,000 baptized Old Order Mennonite members in the USA and 3,000 in Canada.

There were more than 27,000 adult, baptized members of Old Order Mennonites in North America and Belize in 2008/9. The total population of Old Order Mennonites groups speaking Pennsylvania German was about 43,000 in 2015, which indicates that the total population of all Old Order Mennonite groups, including those who have lost the language or are in the process of losing it, was roughly between 60,000 and 70,000 in 2015. Under the condition that the annual growth is 3.7 percent, this would result in a total Old Order Mennonite population of about 72,000 to 84,000 in 2021.

=== Growth ===
The Wenger Mennonites, the largest horse-and-buggy group, have a growth rate of 3.7 percent a year, which is comparable to the growth rate of Old Order Amish. The Wengers have larger families and a higher retention rate than their car-driving brothers, the Horning Mennonites. In 2005, the average number of children per household was 8.25 among Old Order Mennonites in Indiana. In a sample of 199 people from the Martindale District of the Wenger Mennonites, born between 1953 and 1968, there was a retention rate of 95 percent in 1998.

== Similar groups ==
There are quite a lot of similarities between Old Order Mennonites and Old Order Amish, especially between the Amish and the horse-and-buggy Old Order Mennonites, who speak Pennsylvania German in common and who have a shared tradition of plain dress. To a lesser extent there are similarities with conservative "Russian" Mennonites, who live in Latin America, speak another German dialect, Plautdietsch, and who have their own tradition of plain dress. The same is true for the Hutterites, who speak Hutterisch and live in community of goods. There are also similarities with the different Old Order Schwarzenau Brethren groups and the Old Order River Brethren, who have some shared Pennsylvania Dutch heritage with the Old Order Mennonites.

== Publishing ==
The Old Order Mennonites find an affinity with the Old Order Amish publishing house called Pathway Publishers located in LaGrange, Indiana, and Aylmer, Ontario. More recently the Old Order Mennonites of Ontario have done some of their own publishing and a private enterprise known as Vineyard Publications has been formed near Wallenstein, Ontario. Members of the Old Order churches tend to use the Pennsylvania German dialect for literary expression more often than Old Order Amish. There are several authors of Pennsylvania German prose and poetry. Well-known, for example, is Isaac Horst (1918–2008) from Mount Forest (Ontario, Canada), who wrote the book Bei sich selwert un ungewehnlich (in English: "Separate and Peculiar"). Pennsylvania German texts are also published in the Pennsylvania German dialect newspaper Hiwwe wie Driwwe.

== See also ==
- Anabaptists
- Happy as the Grass Was Green, 1973 film
- Mennonites
- Elmo Stoll
- Seeker (Anabaptism)
- Waterloo County, Ontario
