= Ordnung =

Anabaptist rules for church members

In the Anabaptist tradition, an Ordnung is a set of rules describing the way of life of church members. The term is mostly used by Amish and Old Order Mennonites. Ordnung (German: [ˈɔʁdnʊŋ]) is the German word for order, discipline, rule, arrangement, organization, or system. Because the Amish have no central church government, each assembly is autonomous and is its own governing authority. Thus, every local church maintains an individual set of rules, adhering to its own Ordnung, which may vary from district to district as each community administers its own guidelines. Among the Amish, these rules are largely unwritten, yet they define the very essence of Amish identity. Conservative Mennonites refer to Ordnung by the English terms "discipline" or "standard", and their rules are usually written.

== Purpose ==
Anabaptists, such as the Amish, believe in a literal interpretation of the Bible. Thus the Ordnung is intended to ensure that church members live according to the biblical Word of God as they understand it. The Ordnung is a set of behavioral rules, and all members within a church agree to have their lives ordered by that code. Each person is expected to live simple lives devoted to God, to family, and to the community, based upon their understanding of God's laws.

To the Amish, the Ordnung provides a strong sense of group identity. Ultimately, adherents claim that its rules are supported by scripture, and they believe that persecution is the natural result of Christian discipleship. The Ordnung creates boundaries for the Amish, and they view it much like a children's schoolyard fence – remaining within the enclosure allows them freedom, but to cross the fence would mean worldly danger.

In Garry Schmidt's book, Early Anabaptist Spirituality, he argues that a person who has learned to live within a respectful Ordnung appreciates the value of freedom of heart, peace of mind, and clear conscience. And he indicates that such a person had more freedom, more liberty, and more privilege than those outside the church.

Some of the most common Ordnung rules are: separation from the world, hard work, a woman's submission to her husband, mode of dress, and refusal to buy insurance. Non-Amish often think of the Ordnung in terms of restrictions (e.g., women must submit to husbands, no electrical power lines, no telephone in the home, no personal ownership of automobiles). However, many of the Ordnung guidelines also focus on cultivating what the Amish see as beneficial character traits. The Ordnung attempts to prevent pride, envy, vanity, laziness, dishonesty, etc.

According to the Amish, the purpose of the Ordnung is to guide Amish behavior into being more Christ-like, thus defining who they are. It ultimately intends that they be separate and different from the world. As such, anything viewed as disruptive to their society, such as personal power, wealth, and status, are funneled through the Ordnung social order. Disobedience to these lifestyle regulations is punished by discipline initiated by the church leaders. One of the more severe actions that the Amish bishop can mete out is Shunning (German: Meidung).

An Amish minister says of the Ordnung: A respected Ordnung generates peace, love, contentment, equality, and unity. It creates a desire for togetherness and fellowship. It binds marriages, it strengthens family ties to live together, to work together, to worship together and to commune secluded from the world.

— Donald B. Kraybill, The Riddle of Amish Culture, p. 98

== Types ==
Two types of Ordnung must be distinguished.

1. The special conference decisions throughout history, from the 16th century onward.
2. The contemporary rules defined by each church district.

The first are printed rules, the second are generally verbal and are universally understood by the local members. All rules guide the Amish believer in the application and practice of godly principles.

Both types clarify what is considered worldly and sinful. To be worldly is to be lost. Any rule that is not directly supported by biblical references will be justified through reasoning as to why violating it would cause the believer to turn worldly.

Separation from the world means to be different from the world, and the congregation must agree on how they are to be different. This is accomplished through the Ordnung. Two times each year the members come together (Ordnungsgemee) and express their unity before they partake in communion. Their concurrence on the Ordnung implies complete satisfaction with it. The agreement brings peace among members, and peace with God. If there is not group unity, then the Lord's Supper is not observed.

Obedience is a close associate to Ordnung, because it is a symbol informing the body of believers as to whether a member loves the church or does not. There is no middle ground.

== Gelassenheit ==
An important part of Amish life is Gelassenheit (pronounced [ɡəˈlasn̩haɪt]) – 'yieldedness', 'letting be', or 'submission to the will of God' (in modern German approximately: 'composure', 'tranquility', 'serenity'). This concept derives from the Bible when Jesus said, "not my will but thine be done," thereby making individuality, selfishness, and pride, abhorrent (see humility). "He submits to Christ, loses his own will, and yields (Gelassenheit) himself in all areas." Serving others and submitting to God, therefore, permeates all aspects of Amish life. A person's personality must be modest, reserved, calm, and quiet. The values which must be apparent in a believer's actions are submission, obedience, humility, and simplicity. Gelassenheit should be the overriding aspect for every person within the Amish community, and it must be viewable through actions and possessions. Lamentations 3:26 "quietly wait," "in the Froschauer (German) Bible reads in Gelassenheit (instead of quietly) – one probable Biblical reference that helped to establish this important 'Anabaptist term.'"

The Ordnung is used to produce Gelassenheit, which is to be shown via a yielding of spirit to the traditions. The Amish glance back into the past and examine their traditions, treasuring them. The past is always the main resource for coping with the present. An Amish businessman may look forward to plan for new markets for his products, however, he never loses sight of the past and its precious legacy. To give yourself under the church means to yield, to submit. Modern culture's aggressive individualism sharply contrasts with the Amish Gelassenheit. Through Gelassenheit, an Amish person yields to the Ordnung, the will of God, church, elders, parents, community, and traditions. The individual suppresses the will of self in lieu of the Amish community.

By giving up individuality and any thought of selfishness, they embrace God's will by serving others and submitting to Him. To the Amish, Gelassenheit is seen in all of the following aspects of Amish life:

- Personality: reserved, modest, calm, quiet
- Values: submission, obedience, humility, simplicity
- Symbols: dress, horse, carriage, lantern
- Structure: small, informal, local, decentralized
- Ritual: baptism, confession, ordination, foot-washing.

— The Riddle of Amish Culture, Donald Kraybill, Johns Hopkins UP, 1989, p.26.

== Levels of piety ==
There are several levels of piety in the Ordnung moral code.

1. Acceptable behavior – Certain practices that are so widely accepted they are never discussed.
2. Esteemed behavior – The way that church leaders and their spouses are expected to behave, but not necessarily the regular church members.
3. Frowned upon behavior – Things that are discouraged but which are not a test of membership to the church.
4. Forbidden behavior – Prohibited by the Ordnung. They can, and do, affect membership to the church.

There could be another category that is so clearly wrong, it is not included in the Ordnung. Murder would be a prime example.

== Technology ==
Modern technology is used selectively by the Amish for fear that it may weaken the family structure. If any equipment does not maintain principles of Gelassenheit, it is banned. Anything which could promote sloth, luxury or vanity is strictly prohibited. Because 120-volt electricity connects to the outside world, it violates the Amish idea of separation from society. Owning an automobile could be a sign of status and it would promote vanity and competition between the church members; a direct violation of Gelassenheit's value of modesty. A telephone in the house would be a temptation to stay at home speaking to a friend rather than walking or taking a buggy ride to visit a neighbor (though a 'community' telephone is often maintained at a suitable distance from the home to permit contact during emergencies).

Although Amish home and social life has remained mostly unaltered, a new technology can be adopted once it has passed a rigorous examination. The Ordnung is used to examine any new proposed use of technology. A proposal may be accepted for business reasons, but never for personal wishes, for entertainment, or for self-indulgences. A proposal will likely be rejected if it could have negative social implications. A telephone in the home is prohibited among the Old Order Amish because it interferes with face-to-face visits with neighbors. However, a few of the more liberal districts have allowed the telephone. Any technology that is seen to be corrupting spiritual or family life is rejected out of hand. Television would never be considered because it brings unbiblical values into the home.

Amish dairy farms have discarded the metal milk bucket and three-legged stool in favor of an automated milking system. The Food and Drug Administration and the United States Department of Agriculture demand that certain guidelines be followed before milk can be marketed. Thus, power equipment and refrigerated bulk tanks are a necessity and permitted. However, the electricity needed to run a modern dairy must be produced, typically using diesel/gasoline generators or solar power. This may be more expensive than grid electricity, but lacks the degree of intrusion on Amish values and households that would result if fixed-line external power were used.

In farming, horses are used to pull wagons, buggies, and agricultural equipment. Gasoline engines may be allowed to run the machinery but horses are required for locomotion. The Old Order Amish are permitted to use modern transportation as long as they do not own or operate the equipment.

All of these guidelines are set out in the Ordnung, creating a balance between tradition and change.

== Change ==
A district's Ordnung is meant to convey the community's rigid traditions, so whenever members begin exploring new things which raise concerns, the local church must decide if such activities should be allowed. Twice a year each Amish district holds a council meeting, called Ordnungsgemeine, led by the bishop. After listening to a discussion on the issue in question, the adult church members, men and women (all are expected to attend unless they are ill), vote. To ensure that the idea is carefully considered, voting is designed to make any change difficult, because once a rule has been adopted it is difficult to have it rescinded. If two or more people reject the change, the Ordnung remains unaltered. The Amish allow for change, but their emphasis centers on tradition.

When considering a modification of the Ordnung, the members must also consider the implication to the districts around them. If neighboring districts believe a particular change is too radical, the offended district could break off communications and refuse to recognize them as fellow Amish. This threat is of concern, not only for community reasons, but because of family ties. For example, an Amish woman might decide that voting for a change is not worth the risk that she may never again talk to her daughter who married a young man from another district. Because of the threat of being shunned, change to the Ordnung is usually incremental and done in concert with other districts.

No Ordnung of any Anabaptist subgroup remained totally unchanged. Many Old Order Amish, Old Order Mennonites, Old Colony Mennonites and German Baptist groups have changed their Ordnung during the last 150 years so much, that they shifted away from the Old Order type of community. For example, even the most traditional Old Order Amish groups like the Swartzentruber Amish and the Nebraska Amish allow their members to ride in cars under certain circumstances, primarily in cases of emergency.

The Amish have few written explanations why certain things are regulated by the Ordnung. Non-Amish are not allowed to attend their council meetings, and most Amish are hesitant to discuss the details with outsiders, therefore the precise reasons are difficult to explain. They formulate their rules with two interconnected goals in mind. First, is it compatible with their values. If a particular decision might disrupt their religion, tradition, community, or families, they are likely to prohibit it. The second purpose is to create a fence between themselves and Englishers. Most Americans see the Amish as different because they drive buggies, use horse drawn farm implements, dress plainly, etc. These differences are not accidental. When asked today why they have rejected a specific thing, many members of the church will simply reply: "Because it's not Amish."

== Examples of Ordnung rules ==
Because each Amish district is a separate church, Ordnung rules will differ from locale to locale. There are diverse groups among the Amish, thereby creating distinctions within their Ordnung. The following is a general list and not exhaustive.

- Motorized vehicles are not to be owned or driven. The Amish may request a neighbor to drive them, or may hire a driver and rent a car.
- The Amish may not travel on an airplane.
- Clothing codes are to be followed:
  - Males are to wear hats when outside. Black is for the winter, straw color is for the warmer months.
  - Suspenders, not belts, keep up the trousers.
  - Once boys marry, they are expected to grow a beard but shave their upper lip. Unmarried boys must be clean-shaven.
  - Mustaches are frowned upon, because in German culture they have historically been associated with military officers.
  - Clothing must be home sewn.
  - Women are never to shave any part of their body nor to cut their hair.
  - Females must keep their head covered, usually with a prayer bonnet. The color denotes marital status (different colors may be used by different settlements).
- Women are expected to be submissive to their husbands. This means that they must defer to their husband's wishes and opinions.
- Social Security or other commercial insurance is forbidden.
- Children are to attend school through the eighth grade. After that, they are expected to work on the farm or in the home. A parent may find them a job to bring in additional income for the family.
- Full-length mirrors are forbidden, because they are thought to promote vanity and self-admiration.
- Jewelry is not to be worn, not even wedding rings. Other symbols (beards for men, and black bonnets for women) are used, in lieu of rings, to represent marital status.
- An Amish person who has taken the church vow, and who has been found guilty by the bishop of breaking one of the Ordnung rules, can be punished by the Meidung (excommunication or shunning).
- Mobile vehicles, such as buggies or farm implements, must not have rubber tires.
- (Among the Old Order) Church members must not be photographed.
- (Among the Old Order) Telephones are forbidden.
- The use of batteries is allowed (in some districts) for emergency flashlights and similar devices, but discouraged in the home.
- Word processors (powered by generator or DC) are allowed for school and church administrative use. Only non-electric typewriters are used in the home.
- Electricity is not allowed in the home. Electrical energy is allowed in community dairy barns, but only generator power (not grid power).
- Those who are able to work must do so from Monday through Saturday. On Sunday, however, no laborious work is to be done.
- Amish young women and young men are expected to marry other Amish.

Examples of Practices Prescribed by the Ordnung:

- color and style of clothing
- hat styles for men
- order of worship service
- kneeling for prayer in worship
- marriage within the church
- use of horses for fieldwork
- use of Pennsylvania German
- steel wheels on machinery

Examples of Practices Prohibited by the Ordnung:

- air transportation
- central heating in houses
- divorce
- electricity from public power lines
- entering military service
- filing a lawsuit
- jewelry, including wedding rings and wrist watches
- joining worldly (public) organizations
- owning computers, televisions, radios
- owning and operating an automobile
- pipeline milking equipment
- using tractors for fieldwork
- wall-to-wall carpeting

— Donald B. Kraybill, The Riddle of Amish Culture, Revised Edition p.115

- Electricity from utility companies is considered worldly. Bottled gas may be used to heat water, fuel ranges, and run refrigerators. Gas-pressured or kerosene lanterns provide lighting. Batteries power the red lights on buggies. Gasoline generators may provide energy for washing machines, water pumps, and agricultural equipment.
- Telephones may be placed in booths, an unlocked barn, or an Amish school. Cellular phones and voice mail, may only be used by a business to compete, but this is permitted on a case by case basis.
- The Amish travel in horse-drawn buggies, and use horses to pull farm machinery. The horse allows them to take life at a slower pace, and it puts limits on their lives, slowing their work, and requiring additional labor. If business or personal needs necessitate a longer drive, the Amish may hire a taxi.
- The Amish complete their eighth grade education in a one-room private school, taught by an Amish teacher who also attended school through the eighth grade. The skills of spelling, English, Pennsylvania German, mathematics, geography, and health are taught. Some basic science may be taught about animals, stars, and planets. Religion is not taught as a subject, but is an important part of the school program, especially as it relates to behavior.

"Amish practices evolve over time. As modernization takes place, the Amish negotiate to what degree they will accept and utilize technology and other practices of the outside world. This cultural compromise has allowed the Amish to remain a distinct group, yet survive economically."

== See also ==
- Amish terminology
- Book of Discipline
- Code of conduct
- Convention (norm)
- Lifeway
- Religious law
- Sacred tradition
- Social norm
- Traditionalist conservatism
