= Stephen Scott (writer) =

American writer

Stephen Scott (12 April 1948 – 28 December 2011) was an American writer on Anabaptist subjects, especially on Old Order and Conservative Mennonite groups.

== Biography ==
Scott was born in Portsmouth, Ohio, and grew up in Beavercreek, Ohio. He attended Cedarville College and Wright State University, both in the state of his birth. Being a pacifist he did alternative service at Lancaster Mennonite School starting in 1969. From 1979 to 1980 he taught at Clearview Mennonite School. Starting in 1984 he worked for twelve years for "Good Books" and "The People's Place" in Intercourse, Pennsylvania. In early 1997 he was hired at the Young Center for Anabaptist and Pietist Studies where he worked until his death.

He wrote mainly on the history, lifestyle, customs, and beliefs of the Amish and both the Old Order and the Conservative Mennonites. His book An Introduction to Old Order and Conservative Mennonite Groups is an important source on both Old Order Mennonites and also on Conservative Mennonites and still is an often cited book.

He was a member of the Old Order River Brethren from 1969 to his death. He married Hariett Sauder in 1973 and had three children with her.

== Works ==
- "The Amish Way of Life in Modern American Society" in Nanami Suzuki (Editor): "The Anabaptist idea and the way of practicing care : reconsidering the meaning of life in the 21st century" Osaka 2012, p. 33-48.
- "Amish Groups, Affiliations, and Categories", unpublished manuscript, 2011.
- Together with Hillary Daecher: "Hymnody : Anabaptist, Pietist and Lutheran traditions" Gettysburg, PA 2008.
- Together with Joy Kraybill: "The story of the village of Intercourse", Intercourse, PA 2005.
- "An Introduction to Old Order and Conservative Mennonite Groups", Intercourse PA 1996.
- "Amish Houses and Barnes", Intercourse, PA 1992.
- "Living Without Electricity", Intercourse, PA 1990.
- "The Amish Wedding and Other Special Occasions of the Old Order Communities", Intercourse, PA 1988.
- "Why Do They Dress That Way", Intercourse, PA 1986.
- "Plain Buggies: Amish, Mennonite, and Brethren Horse-drawn Transportation" Intercourse, PA 1981.
- "The Plain churches of Lancaster County, Pennsylvania and related groups; Mennonite-Amish-Brethren-River Brethren", Lancaster, PA 1975.
