= Amish Mennonite =

Anabaptist sect

Amish Mennonites came into existence through reform movements among North American Amish mainly between 1862 and 1878. These Amish moved away from the old Amish traditions and drew near to the Mennonites, becoming Mennonites of Amish origin. Over the decades, most Amish Mennonites groups removed the word "Amish" from the name of their congregations or merged with Mennonite groups.

In the latest decades the term "Amish Mennonite" is sometimes erroneously used to designate horse-and-buggy Old Order Mennonites, whose lifestyle is more or less similar to the Old Order Amish. Sometimes the term "Amish Mennonite" is used to designate all groups of Amish, both the Old Order Amish and the Amish Mennonites and also the Amish before this division in the second half of the 19th century. The Global Anabaptist Mennonite Encyclopedia Online uses the term "Amish Mennonite" in this sense.

== History ==
=== Division 1850–1878 ===
Most Amish communities that were established in North America did not ultimately retain their Amish identity. The major division that resulted in the loss of identity of many Amish congregations occurred in the third quarter of the 19th century. The forming of factions worked its way out at different times at different places. The process was rather a "sorting out" than a split. Amish people are free to join another Amish congregation at another place that fits them best. Between 1862 and 1878 yearly Dienerversammlungen (ministerial conferences) were held at different places, concerning how the Amish should deal with the pressures of modern society. By the first several meetings, the more traditionally minded bishops agreed to boycott the conferences.

The more progressive members, comprising approximately two-thirds of the group, became known by the name Amish Mennonite, and eventually united with the Mennonite Church, and other Mennonite denominations, mostly in the early 20th century. The more traditionally minded groups became known as the Old Order Amish. The Egli Amish had already started to withdraw from the Amish church in 1858. They soon drifted away from the old ways and changed their name to "Defenseless Mennonite" in 1908. Congregations that took no side in the division after 1862 formed the Conservative Amish Mennonite Conference in 1910 but dropped the word "Amish" from their name in 1957.

As there was no division in Europe, the Amish congregations remaining there took the same way as the change-minded Amish Mennonites in North America and slowly merged with the Mennonites. The last Amish congregation in Germany to merge was the Ixheim Amish congregation, which merged with the neighboring Mennonite Church in 1937. Some Mennonite congregations, including most in Alsace, are descended directly from former Amish congregations.

=== Early conferences ===
The Amish Mennonites formed regional conferences in the late 1880s after the division. During the early 20th century, most of these original Amish Mennonite groups merged with regional Mennonite conferences and lost their Amish identity.

- The Indiana-Michigan Amish Mennonite Conference, organized in 1888 and merged with the Indiana-Michigan Mennonite Conference in 1916.
- The Western District Amish Mennonite Conference, organized in 1890 and merged with the Western Mennonite Conferences in 1920–1921.
- The Eastern Amish Mennonite Conference, organized in 1893 and merged with the Ohio Mennonite Conference in 1927.
- The Ontario Amish Mennonite Conference, organized in 1925, assimilated into the Mennonite mainstream in the 1950s and early 1960s and changed their name to Western Ontario Mennonite Conference in 1963.
- The Stuckey Amish (Mennonites) of Illinois, emerged from a split in 1872, organized as a conference in 1899 and joined the General Conference Mennonite Church as a district conference in 1945. In 1957 it merged with the Middle District Conference to form the Central District of the General Conference Mennonite Church.
- The Egli Amish, also known as the Égly Amish, were organized in 1865–1866 and changed their name to Defenseless Mennonite Church in 1908. They adopted the name Evangelical Mennonite Church in 1949 and became mainstream. While Evangelical Mennonite Churches currently exist, in 2003, a broader group of Mennonites became the Fellowship of Evangelical Churches.

=== Later conferences ===
The "Conservative Amish Mennonite Conference" (now known as the Rosedale Network of Churches) was born several decades after the original Amish Mennonite movement. In 1910, leaders from three unaffiliated Amish Mennonite congregations met in Michigan to discuss the formation of a conference that allowed for congregational autonomy yet would be able to assist individual churches with problems. This conference was to be more conservative than the aforementioned Amish Mennonite conferences. Nonetheless it moved closer to mainstream Mennonite groups, eventually losing its Amish identity. In 1954, a majority vote called for the removal of the "Amish" part of the Conservative Amish Mennonite Conference (CMC) name, which was implemented in the 1957 constitution revision. Proponents suggested that "Amish Mennonite" conferences were obsolete. During the 1960s, concern rose among some about the lax practice on issues such as the women’s head veiling and cut hair, television, and clothing items. Individual churches began to differ greatly in practice. Since the concerns in the 1960s, the conference has abandoned a stand on the aforementioned practices, resulting in the Biblical Mennonite Alliance in 2000, which continues to uphold the practice of headcovering for women.

Leading the process of assimilation further the "Ohio Mennonite and Eastern Amish Mennonite Joint Conference" became the "Ohio and Eastern Mennonite Conference" in 1955 and the "Ontario Amish Mennonite Conference" became the "Western Ontario Mennonite Conference" in 1963.

== Kauffman Amish Mennonite ==
The Kauffman Amish Mennonites, also called Sleeping Preacher Churches or Tampico Amish Mennonite Churches, are a Plain branch of the Amish Mennonites whose tradition goes back to John D. Kauffman (1847–1913) who preached while being in trance. In 2017, they had some 2,000 baptized members and lived mainly in Missouri and Arkansas. In contrast to other Amish Mennonites they have largely retained the Pennsylvania German language and other traditions from the late 1800s. They allow some modern conveniences, such as electricity and cars. The Kauffman Amish Mennonite congregations are one of a few groups that clearly identifies itself as an Amish Mennonite constituency.

== Beachy Amish Mennonites ==
The largest and most dominant contemporary Amish Mennonite group are the Beachy Amish Mennonites. The Beachy Amish received their name from Moses M. Beachy, a former Old Order Amish bishop in Somerset County, Pennsylvania. Beachy refused to administer a strict form of shunning against members whose only offense was transferring membership to the nearby Conservative Amish Mennonite congregation. Half of the congregation sided with Beachy, and the other half sided with co-ministers Yoder and Yoder. Beachy's congregation affiliated with a similar Amish Mennonite congregation in Lancaster County, today known as the Weavertown Amish Mennonite Church. During the 1940s, a number of other factions emerged in Ohio, Indiana, Illinois, Iowa, Kansas, Oklahoma, and Virginia from Old Order Amish groups. The congregations sought affiliation with the Beachy constituency.

Today, the Beachy Amish vary widely in practice, as the constituency is a fellowship with congregational autonomy separate of a governing conference. Most have retained conservative, plain practices, but this is becoming increasingly questioned, especially in more mainstream churches in predominantly Old Order Amish areas, though not exclusively confined to these regions. New standard allowances in the more mainstream congregations include the radio and DVD or video watching. Clothing is also less distinct in these congregations, especially among the men; however, women's dress has become less distinguishable with a tighter fit and the wearing of sweaters or jackets, and coverings undergone abbreviation. In light of these trends, certain Beachy Amish Mennonite congregations organized into fellowships to retain the traditional emphasis on plain dress and nonconformity to the world, including the Maranatha Amish-Mennonite Churches, Ambassadors Amish Mennonite, Mennonite Christian Fellowship, Berea Amish-Mennonite Churches, and Midwest Beachy Amish-Mennonite who are also called Old Beachy Amish.

The most conservative of Beachy congregations use German in services, refuse to have their photograph taken, and dress similar to the New Order Amish. Between these two range points is a wide variety of practice.

== Mennonite Christian Fellowship ==
The Mennonite Christian Fellowship churches, also known as the "Fellowship churches", originated from several congregations separating from the Old Order Amish in the 1950s and 1960s. The congregations resembled the more conservative end of the Beachy Amish Mennonite constituency at that time. The two groups shared fellowship to the extent that these churches were incorporated into the Beachy affiliation. In 1977, however, some of the ordained men in these churches expressed concern about perceived worldly trends among the Beachy Amish. They met with other ordained Beachy Amish men. Some concerns included members baptized without a true Christian conversion, worldly fads in clothing and lifestyle, and churches conglomerating in communities instead of spreading out. After this meeting, the concerned men decided to withdraw from the Beachy Amish church fellowship, and organize the Mennonite Christian Fellowship. In 1978, these churches started holding their own annual Minister’s Meetings. They operate their own Christian day schools and use Sunday School materials printed by Rod and Staff Publishers of Crockett, Kentucky. They have sponsored missions in Nicaragua, Costa Rica, Honduras, and Paraguay. In 2006, the Fellowship churches had 1,518 members in 34 congregations.

== Other congregations ==
A number of other Amish Mennonite congregations exist in an independent, unaffiliated setting. Most identify themselves in name as Conservative Mennonites or conservative Amish Mennonite and may hold fellowship with various Beachy or conservative Mennonite congregations.

Two newer affiliated groups include Berea Amish Mennonite Churches and Ambassador Amish Mennonite Churches. There is also a small group of Old Beachy Amish congregations which still use the German Language.

== Membership and congregations ==
Around the year 2000 there were 13 Amish Mennonite congregations in five states of the US. Membership of these congregations was 1,222. There were also 16 unaffiliated Amish Mennonite congregations in nine states with 737 members.

== Directory ==
The Amish Mennonite Directory, published by Abana Books, lists Amish Mennonite congregations within Beachy, Fellowship, and unaffiliated constituencies; the directory includes detailed information, including household demographic and occupational data.

== See also ==
- Anabaptism
- Biblical Mennonite Alliance
- Conservative Mennonites
- List of Amish and their descendants
- Subgroups of Amish

== Literature ==
- Anderson, Cory A. (2012). The Amish-Mennonites of North America. Medina, NY: Ridgeway Publishing. ISBN 9780984888863.
- Anderson, Cory A. (2011). "Retracing the blurred boundaries of twentieth-century "Amish Mennonite" identity". The Mennonite Quarterly Review. Goshen, IN.
- Beachy, Alvin J. (April 1955). "The Rise and Development of the Beachy Amish Mennonite Churches". The Mennonite Quarterly Review: 118–140.
- "Map of CMC Congregations". Conservative Mennonite Conference, Rosedale, OH. Archived from the original on September 27, 2007.
- Mennonite Church Directory 2005–2007. Harrisonburg, VA: Christian Light Publications.
- Miller, Daniel, ed. (2005). Amish Mennonite Directory 2005. Millersburg, OH.
- Miller, Ivan J. (1985). History of the Conservative Mennonite Conference: 1910–1985. Grantsville, MD.
- Nolt, Steven M. (1992). A History of the Amish. Intercourse. ISBN 9781680990652.
- Yoder, Elmer S. (1987). The Beachy Amish Mennonite Fellowship Churches. Sugarcreek, OH.
- Yoder, Paton (1991). Tradition and Transition: Amish Mennonites and Old Order Amish, 1800–1900. Scottdale, PA. ISBN 9781579104689 (2001 edition)
- Wick, Barthinius L. (1894). The Amish Mennonites. A Sketch of Their Origin, and of Their Settlement in Iowa. With Their Creed in an Appendix. Iowa City, IA. (This book is about the Amish Mennonites in the sense of the Global Anabaptist Mennonite Encyclopedia Online, see above.)
