= Amish =

Group of traditionalist Christian church fellowships

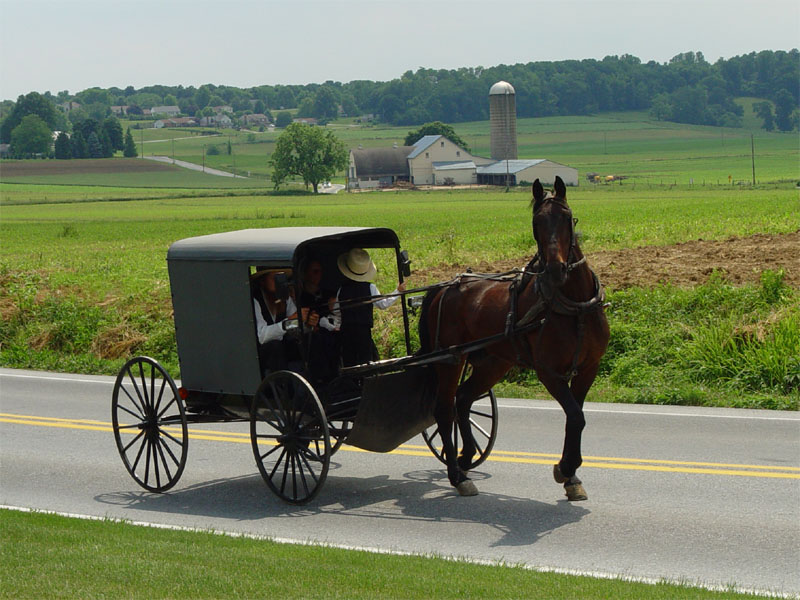
- An Amish family riding in a traditional Amish buggy in Lancaster County, Pennsylvania

Total population
- ▲421,340 (2026, Old Order Amish)

Founder
- Jakob Ammann

Regions with significant populations
- North America over 98% in the United States (large populations in Pennsylvania, Ohio and Indiana, notable populations in Wisconsin, New York, Michigan, Missouri, and Kentucky, small populations in various other states); Canada (mainly in Ontario)

Religions
- Christianity (Anabaptism)

Scriptures
- Bible

Languages
- English; Pennsylvania Dutch; Swiss German

The Amish (/ˈɑː.mɪʃ/, also /ˈæm.ɪʃ/ or /ˈeɪ.mɪʃ/; Pennsylvania German: Amisch), formally the Old Order Amish, are a group of traditionalist Anabaptist Christian church fellowships with Swiss and Alsatian origins. Because they maintain a degree of separation from surrounding populations, and hold their faith in common, the Amish have been described by certain scholars as an ethnoreligious group, combining features of an ethnicity and a Christian denomination. The Amish are closely related to Old Order Mennonites and Conservative Mennonites, denominations that are also a part of Anabaptist Christianity. The Amish are known for simple living, plain dress, Christian pacifism, and slowness to adopt many conveniences of modern technology, with a view neither to interrupt family time, nor replace face-to-face conversations whenever possible, and a view to maintain self-sufficiency. The Amish value rural life, manual labor, humility and Gelassenheit (submission to God's will).

The Amish church began with a schism in Switzerland within a group of Swiss and Alsatian Mennonite Anabaptists in 1693 led by Jakob Ammann. Those who followed Ammann became known as Amish. In the second half of the 19th century, the Amish divided into Old Order Amish and Amish Mennonites; the latter do not abstain from using motor cars, whereas the Old Order Amish retained much of their traditional culture. When people refer to the Amish today, they normally refer to the Old Order Amish, though there are other subgroups of Amish. The Amish fall into three main subgroups—the Old Order Amish, the New Order Amish, and the Beachy Amish—all of whom wear plain dress and live their life according to the Bible as codified in their church's Ordnung. The Old Order Amish and New Order Amish conduct their worship in German, speak Pennsylvania Dutch, and use buggies for transportation, in contrast to the Beachy Amish who use modern technology (inclusive of motor cars) and conduct worship in the local language of the area in which they reside. Both the New Order Amish and the Beachy Amish emphasize the New Birth, evangelize to seek converts, and have Sunday schools.

In the early 18th century, many Amish and Mennonites emigrated to Pennsylvania for a variety of reasons. Most Old Order Amish, New Order Amish and the Old Beachy Amish speak Pennsylvania Dutch, but Indiana's Swiss Amish also speak Alemannic dialects. As of 2024, the Amish population surpassed the 400,000 milestone, with about 415,000 Old Order Amish living in the United States, and over 6,000 in Canada: a population that is rapidly growing. Amish church groups seek to maintain a degree of separation from the non-Amish world. Non-Amish people are generally referred to as "English" by the Amish, and outside influences are often described as "worldly".

Amish church membership begins with adult baptism, usually between the ages of 16 and 23. Church districts have between 20 and 40 families, and Old Order Amish and New Order Amish worship services are held every other Sunday in a member's home or barn, while the Beachy Amish worship every Sunday in churches. The rules of the church, the Ordnung, which differs to some extent between different districts, are reviewed twice a year by all members of the church. The Ordnung must be observed by every member and covers many aspects of Old Order Amish day-to-day living, including prohibitions or limitations on the use of power-line electricity, telephones, and automobiles, as well as regulations on clothing. Generally, a heavy emphasis is placed on church and family relationships. The Old Order Amish typically operate their own one-room schools and discontinue formal education after grade eight (age 13–14). Most Amish do not buy commercial insurance or participate in Social Security. As present-day Anabaptists, Amish church members practice nonresistance and will not perform any type of military service.

== History ==
=== Beginnings of Anabaptist Christianity ===
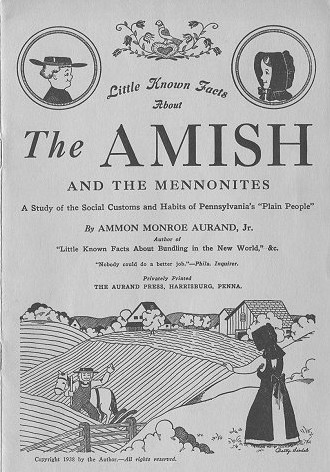
Cover of The Amish and the Mennonites, 1938

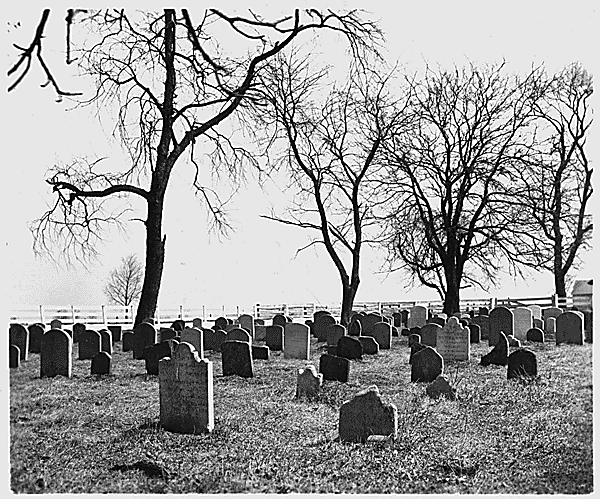
An old Amish cemetery in Lancaster County, Pennsylvania, 1941

The Anabaptist movement, from which the Amish later emerged, started in circles around Huldrych Zwingli (1484–1531) who led the early Reformation in Switzerland. In Zürich on January 21, 1525, Conrad Grebel and George Blaurock practiced believer's baptism to each other and then to others. This Swiss movement, part of the Radical Reformation, later became known as Swiss Brethren.

=== Emergence of the Amish ===
The term Amish was first used as a Schandename (a term of disgrace) in 1710 by opponents of Jakob Ammann, an Anabaptist leader. The first informal division between Swiss Brethren was recorded in the 17th century between Oberländers (those living in the Bernese Oberland) and Emmentalers (those living in the Emmental). The Oberländers were a more extreme congregation; their zeal pushed them into more remote areas.

Swiss Anabaptism developed, from this point, in two parallel streams, most clearly marked by disagreement over the preferred treatment of "fallen" believers. The Emmentalers (sometimes referred to as Reistians, after bishop Hans Reist, a leader among the Emmentalers) argued that fallen believers should only be withheld from communion, and not regular meals. The Amish argued that those who had been banned should be avoided even in common meals. The Reistian side eventually formed the basis of the Swiss Mennonite Conference. Because of this common heritage, Amish and conservative Mennonites from southern Germany and Switzerland retain many similarities. Those who leave the Amish fold tend to join various congregations of Conservative Mennonites.

=== Migration to North America ===
The Amish began migrating to Pennsylvania, then regarded favorably for its lack of religious persecution and attractive land offers, in the early 18th century as part of a larger migration from the Palatinate and neighboring areas. Between 1717 and 1750, approximately 500 Amish migrated to North America, mainly to the region that became Berks County, Pennsylvania, but later moved, motivated by land issues and by security concerns tied to the French and Indian War. Many eventually settled in Lancaster County. A second wave of around 1,500 arrived around the mid-19th century and settled mostly in Ohio, Illinois, Iowa, and southern Ontario. Most of these late immigrants eventually did not join the Old Order Amish but more liberal groups.

=== 1850–1878: Division into Old Orders and Amish Mennonites ===
Most Amish communities that were established in North America did not ultimately retain their Amish identity. The major division that resulted in the loss of identity of many Amish congregations occurred in the third quarter of the 19th century. Scholar Steven Nolt considers the year 1865 as the symbolic point of public separation between change-minded and tradition-minded Amish. The forming of factions worked its way out at different times at different places. The process was more a "sorting out" than a split. Amish people are free to join another Amish congregation at another place that fits them best. However, scholar Donald Kraybill noted that residents of one district cannot become members of another one unless they move into its territory.

In the years after 1850, tensions rose within individual Amish congregations and between different Amish congregations. Between 1862 and 1878, yearly Dienerversammlungen (ministerial conferences) were held at different places, concerning how the Amish should deal with the tensions caused by the pressures of modern society. Though the initial idea of a continental conference was floated by tradition-minded leaders to bring churches together around the "practical expressions of humility, simplicity, and peace," it fell to a progressive Amish deacon, eastern Lancaster County's John Stoltzfus, to call the first conference. From the beginning, the ministerial conferences favored change-minded Amish agenda. Conservatives attended in growing numbers through 1865, when they presented the Holmes County manifesto; after it was set aside, most of them stopped attending. After 1865, only a few conservative Amish leaders attended another annual conference. Marginalized within their church, traditionalists withdrew from the activities of an Amish majority increasingly open to change.

The more progressive members, comprising roughly two-thirds of the group, became known by the name Amish Mennonite, and eventually united with the Mennonite Church, and other Mennonite denominations, mostly in the early 20th century. The more traditionally minded groups became known as the Old Order Amish. The Egli Amish had already started to withdraw from the Amish church in 1858. They soon drifted away from the old ways and changed their name to "Defenseless Mennonite" in 1908. Congregations who took no side in the division after 1862 formed the Conservative Amish Mennonite Conference in 1910, but dropped the word "Amish" from their name in 1957; in the year 2000 many congregations left to organize the Biblical Mennonite Alliance in order to continue the practice of traditional Anabaptist ordinances, such as headcovering.

Because no division occurred in Europe, the Amish congregations remaining there followed the same path as the change-minded Amish Mennonites in North America and slowly merged with the Mennonites. The last Amish congregation in Germany to merge was the Ixheim Amish congregation, which merged with the neighboring Mennonite Church in 1937. Some Mennonite congregations, including most in Alsace, are descended directly from former Amish congregations.

=== 20th century ===
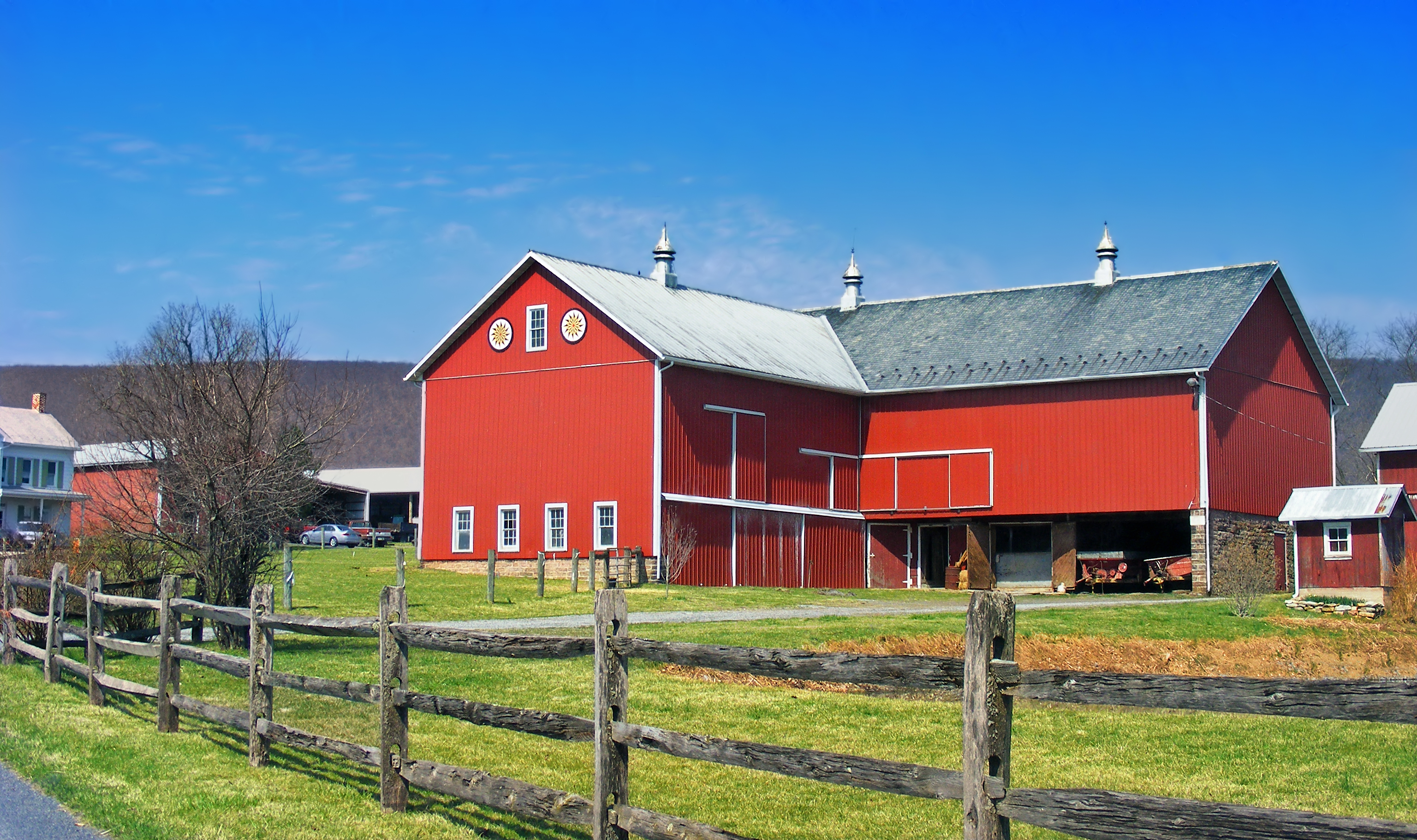
Red barns are common on Amish farms.

Although splits happened among the Old Order in the 19th century in Mifflin County, Pennsylvania, a major split occurred in World War I. At that time, two very conservative affiliations emerged – the Swartzentruber Amish in Holmes County, Ohio, and the Buchanan Amish in Iowa. The Buchanan Amish soon were joined by like-minded congregations all over the country.

After the entry into the war with Germany came the suppression of the German language in the US that eventually led to language shift of most Pennsylvania German speakers, leaving the Amish and other Old Orders as almost the only speakers by the end of the 20th century. This created a language barrier around the Amish that did not exist before in that form.

In the late 1920s, the more change-minded faction of the Old Order Amish, that wanted to adopt the car, broke away from the mainstream and organized under the name Beachy Amish.

During the Second World War, the old question of military service for the Amish came up again. Because Amish young men in general refused military service, they ended up in the Civilian Public Service (CPS), where they worked mainly in forestry and hospitals. The fact that many young men worked in hospitals, where they had a lot of contact with more progressive Mennonites and the outside world, had the result that many of these men never joined the Amish church.

In the 1950s, the Beachy Amish laid heavy emphasis on the New Birth, personal holiness and Sunday School education. The ones who wanted to preserve the old way of the Beachy became the Old Beachy Amish.

In 1966, the New Order Amish were formed after certain congregations left the Old Order Amish due to issues regarding salvation and "the use of modern agricultural methods". The Old Order Amish believe that they have a "hope for salvation", reckoning that "joining with other church members to live according to the Ordnung and the Bible will give them the strength to lives worthy of salvation". The New Order Amish, on the other hand, affirm that a believer can have assurance—"that one can know the state of his soul while on earth".

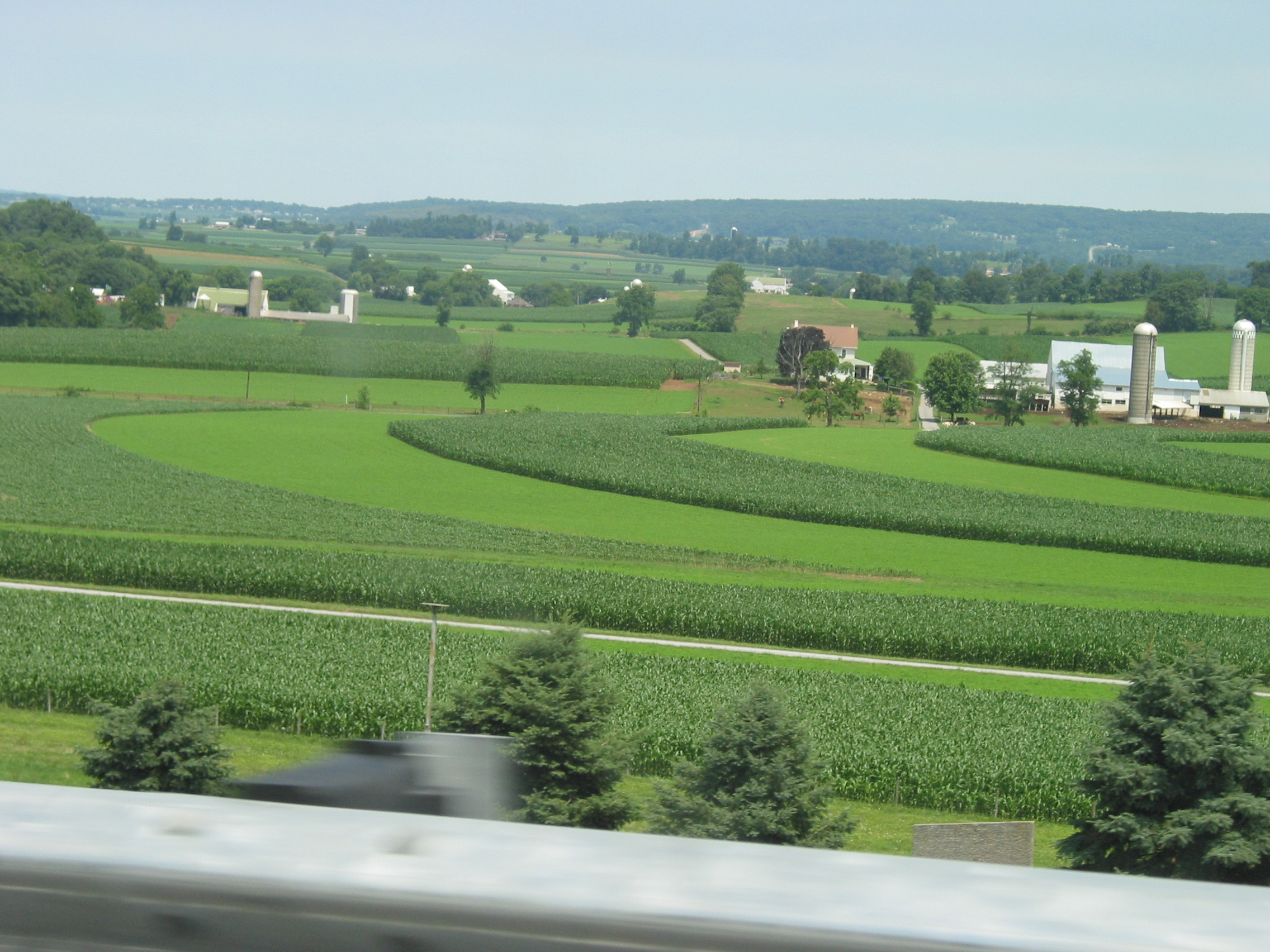
A view of Amish farms from westbound US 30

Until about 1950, almost all Amish children attended small, rural, non-Amish schools, but then school consolidation and mandatory schooling beyond eighth grade caused Amish opposition. Amish communities opened their own Amish schools. In 1972, the United States Supreme Court exempted Amish pupils from compulsory education past eighth grade. By the end of the 20th century, almost all Amish children attended Amish schools.

In the last quarter of the 20th century, a growing number of Amish men left farm work and started small businesses because of increasing pressure on small-scale farming. Though a wide variety of small businesses exists among the Amish, construction work and woodworking are quite widespread. In many Amish settlements, especially the larger ones, farmers are now a minority. Approximately 12,000 of the 40,000 dairy farms in the United States are Amish-owned as of 2018.

Until the early 20th century, Old Order Amish identity was not linked to the limited use of technologies, as the Old Order Amish and their rural neighbors used the same farm and household technologies. Questions about the use of technologies also did not play a role in the Old Order division of the second half of the 19th century. Telephones were the first important technology that was rejected, soon followed by the rejection of cars, tractors, radios, and many other technological inventions of the 20th century.

Old Order Mennonites, Old Colony Mennonites and the Amish are often grouped together in North America's popular press. This is incorrect, according to a 2017 report by Canadian Mennonite magazine:

The customs of Old Order Mennonites, the Amish communities and Old Colony Mennonites have a number of similarities, but the cultural differences are significant enough so that members of one group would not feel comfortable moving to another group. The Old Order Mennonites and Amish have the same European roots and the language spoken in their homes is the same German dialect. Old Colony Mennonites use Low German, a different German dialect.

== Religious practices ==
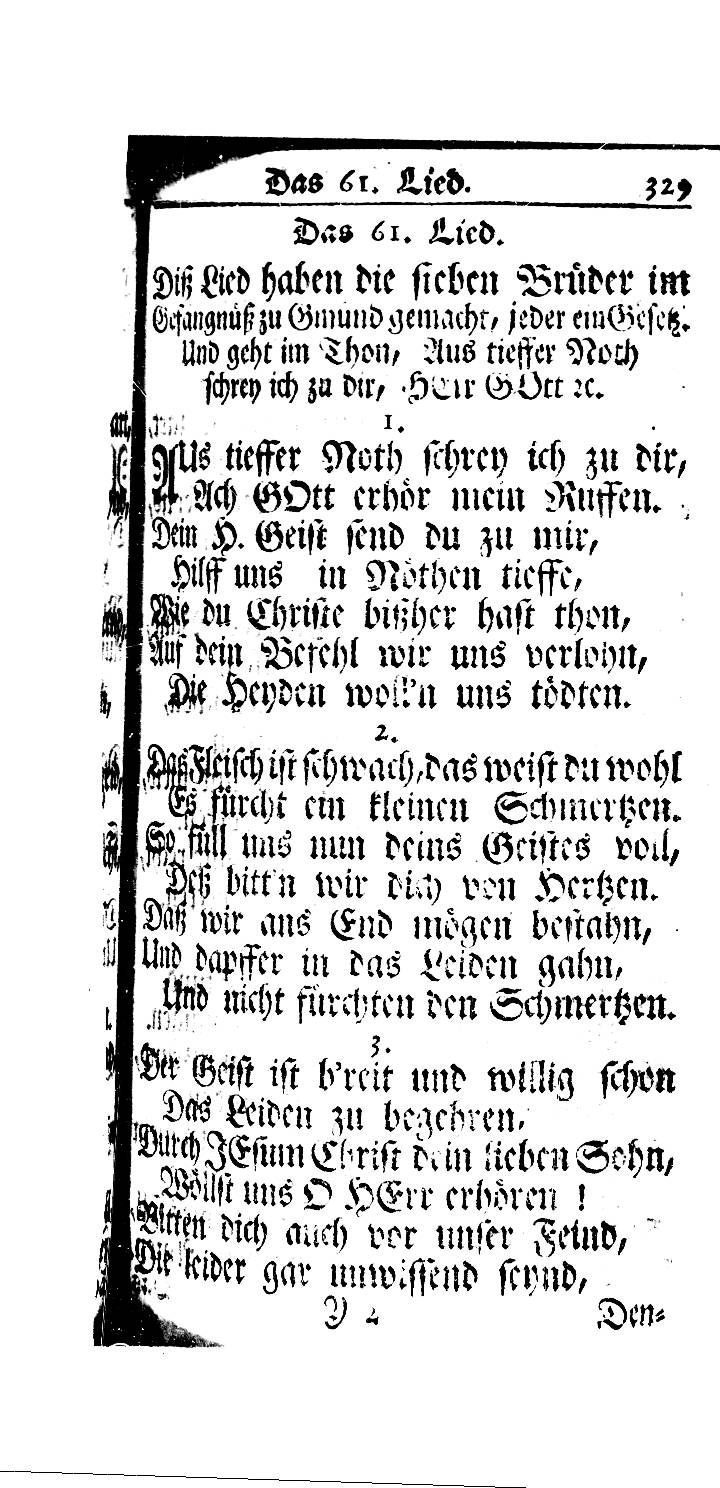
A scan of the historical document Diß Lied haben die sieben Brüder im Gefängnüß zu Gmünd gemacht

Two key concepts for understanding Amish practices are their rejection of Hochmut (pride, high-mindedness, arrogance) and the high value they place on Demut (humility) and Gelassenheit (calmness, acceptance, and yieldedness), often translated as "submission" or "letting be". The Amish consider being forward, pushy, or self-promoting as signs of pride rather than of Gelassenheit. The meek spirit of Gelassenheit, which manifests as yielding to higher authorities: the will of God, the church, elders, parents, community, and tradition, stands in sharp contrast to the individualism so central to the wider American culture. The Amish anti-individualist orientation is the motive for rejecting labor-saving technologies that might make one self-reliant and independent, thereby mocking the spirit of humility and being less dependent on the community. Modern innovations such as electricity might bring an avalanche of household appliances and conveniences that would disrupt their lives; posing for photographs might cultivate personal pride and vanity. The Amish way of life of separating from the world comes from biblical texts such as Romans 12:2 ("Don't be conformed to the world"), and hooking up to public electricity would connect Amish homes too directly to the outside world.

Amish church membership begins with baptism, usually between the ages of 16 and 23. It is a requirement for marriage within the Amish church. Once a person is baptized within the church, he or she may marry only within the faith. Church districts have between 20 and 40 families and worship services are held every other Sunday in a member's home or barn. The district is led by a bishop and several ministers and deacons who are chosen by a combination of election and cleromancy (lot).

The rules of the church, the so-called Ordnung, which differs to some extent between different districts, is reviewed twice a year by all members of the church. Only if all members give their consent to it, Lord's supper is held. The Ordnung must be observed by every member and covers many aspects of day-to-day living, including prohibitions or limitations on the use of power-line electricity, telephones, and automobiles, as well as regulations on clothing. As present-day Anabaptists, Amish church members practice nonresistance and will not perform any type of military service. The Amish value rural life, manual labor, humility, and Gelassenheit, all under the auspices of living what they interpret to be God's word.

Members who do not conform to these community expectations and who cannot be convinced to repent face excommunication and shunning. The modes of shunning vary between different communities. On average, about 85 percent of Amish youth choose to be baptized and join the church. During an adolescent period of rumspringa (lit. 'running around', from Pennsylvania German rumschpringe 'to run around; to gad; to be wild'; compare Standard German herum-, rumspringen 'to jump around') in some communities, nonconforming behavior that would result in the shunning of an adult who had made the permanent commitment of baptism, may be met with a degree of forbearance.

== Way of life ==
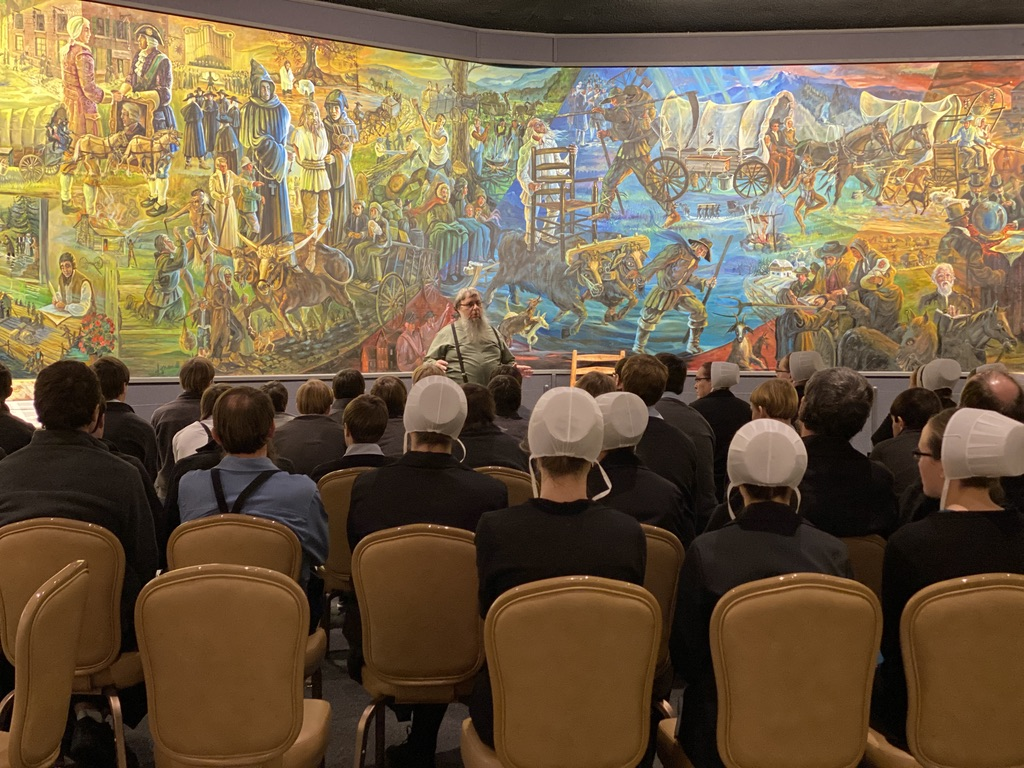
Amish youth learning about a church before considering membership

Amish lifestyle is regulated by the Ordnung ("rules"), which differs slightly from community to community and from district to district within a community. There is no central Amish governing authority. Each Amish community makes its own decisions, and what is acceptable in one community may be unacceptable in another. The Ordnung is agreed upon – or changed – within the whole community of baptized members prior to Communion which takes place two times a year. The meeting where the Ordnung is discussed is called Ordnungsgemeine in Standard German and Ordningsgmee in Pennsylvania Dutch. The Ordnung includes such matters as dress, permissible uses of technology, religious duties, and rules regarding interaction with outsiders. In these meetings, women also vote in questions concerning the Ordnung.

Bearing children, raising them, and socializing with neighbors and relatives are the greatest functions of the Amish family. Amish typically believe that large families are a blessing from God. Farm families tend to be larger, because sons are needed to perform farm labor. Community is central to the Amish way of life.

Working hard is considered godly, and some technological advancements have been considered undesirable because they reduce the need for hard work. Amish also avoid using technologies they believe will disrupt their traditional lives. Machines, such as automatic floor cleaners in barns, have historically been rejected as this provides young farmhands with too much free time.

=== Transportation ===
Amish communities are known for traveling by horse and buggy because they feel horse-drawn vehicles promote a slow pace of life. Many Amish communities do also allow riding in motor vehicles, such as buses and cars. They also are allowed to travel by train. In recent years, many Amish people have taken to using electric bicycles as they are faster than either walking or harnessing up a horse and buggy.

=== Clothing ===
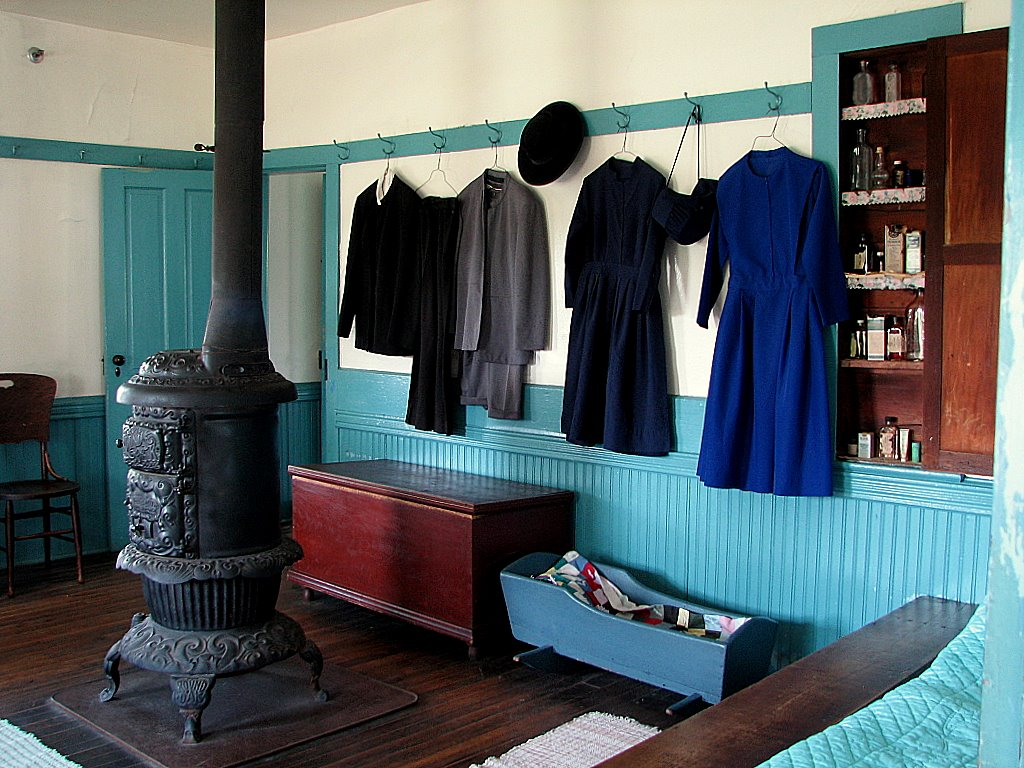
Clothing is plain in style and sewn by hand.

The Amish are known for their plain attire. Men wear solid-colored shirts, broad-brimmed hats, and suits that signify similarity amongst one another. Amish men grow beards to symbolize manhood and marital status, as well as to promote humility. They are forbidden from growing mustaches because mustaches are seen by the Amish as being affiliated with the military, to which they are strongly opposed, due to their pacifist beliefs.

Women have similar guidelines on how to dress, which are also expressed in the Ordnung, the Amish version of legislation. They are to wear calf-length dresses, muted colors along with bonnets and aprons. Prayer kapps and bonnets are worn by the women because they are a visual representation of their religious beliefs and promote unity through the tradition of every woman wearing one. The younger girls wear the white kapp from early childhood until they are about sixteen years old. Then they change to wearing the black kapp until their marriage when they change again to the white kapp. Most Amish women wear bonnets over their kapps, or head coverings, when in public. Black is the predominant bonnet color, although women in the Byler Amish affiliation wear brown bonnets. Swartzentruber women wear scarves between their head coverings and bonnets, while women in the Nebraska Amish affiliation wear broad-brimmed, flat-crowned straw hats rather than bonnets. Skirts are required to be long, covering the ankles. Amish women are not allowed to wear jewelry, such as wedding rings, as it is seen as drawing attention to the body which can induce pride in the individual. Hair styling, fashionable clothing, neon colors, and printed fabrics are likewise prohibited. The use of makeup is also forbidden, even for the deceased in the casket.

Clothing is mostly home-made and cut the same way for all the members of the family, but the way to fasten the garment widely depends on whether the Amish person is a part of the New Order or Old Order Amish. For the Old Order Amish, buttons are forbidden specifically on coats and vests due to their historical association with military uniforms. They use hooks and eyes on coats and vests instead, though still need occasional buttons for shirts and pants. Amish women typically fasten their dresses using hooks, eyes, and pins. Later, a compromise emerged in some communities to preserve Amish identity while permitting flexibility during the week. Buttons are now worn on work clothes, but traditional hook-and-eye fasteners are still required on Sundays. The New Order Amish place more emphasis on spiritual values, which to some extent undercut the ability of Ordnung to regulate "externals." Even though they still strive to live simple life, they have fewer restrictions on the use of technology and are less traditional in dress.

=== Cuisine ===
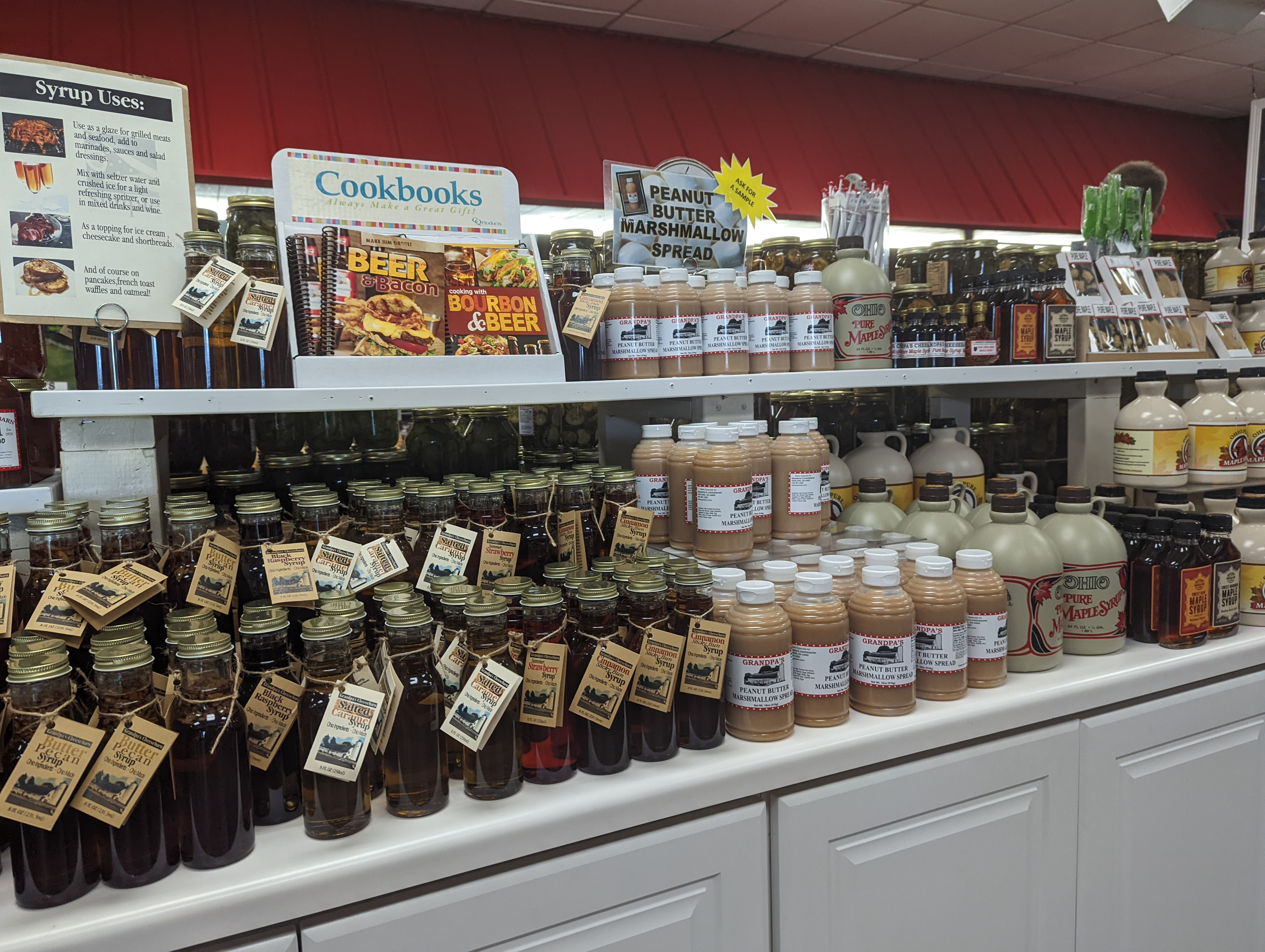
Amish food sold at a market

Amish cuisine is noted for its simplicity and traditional qualities. Food plays an important part in Amish social life and is served at potlucks, weddings, fundraisers, farewells, and other events. Many Amish foods are sold at markets, including pies, preserves, bread mixes, pickled produce, desserts, and canned goods. Many Amish communities have also established restaurants for visitors. Amish meat consumption is similar to the American average though they tend to eat more preserved meat.

Amish cuisine is often mistaken for the similar cuisine of the Pennsylvania Dutch with some ethnographic and regional variances, as well as differences in what cookbook writers and food historians emphasize about the traditional foodways and intertwined religious culture and celebrations of Amish communities. While myths about the diffusion of shoofly pie are common subject matter for studies of American cuisine, food anthropologists point out that the culinary practices of Pennsylvania Dutch and Amish are innovative and dynamic, evolving across time and geographic spaces, and that not all the Pennsylvania Dutch are Amish, and not all Amish live in Pennsylvania. Distinguishing local myths from culinary fact is accomplished by dedicated anthropological field studies in combination with studies of literary sources, usually newspaper archives, diaries, and household records.

== Economic activities ==
Historically, Amish communities were primarily agrarian, with most families engaged in farming. However, rapid population growth and the resulting social and economic pressures have led to significant diversification in Amish employment patterns since the mid-20th century.

In the Greater Holmes County settlement area of Ohio—the largest Amish community—approximately 75% of married males were full-time farmers in 1965. By contrast, only about 40% remained so by 1996, indicating a marked shift toward non-farming occupations. The ratio of farmers to non-farmers in the region declined from 2.41 to 0.61 during this period.

More recent analyses of the Holmes County Amish Directory show that this move away from farming continues. In a 2015 census-level study, only 16% of male family heads who listed an occupation were farmers, while the remainder worked in other sectors.

Common non-farming occupations include roofing, carpentry, construction, metalworking, and small-scale manufacturing.

Despite the shift away from farming in recent decades, Amish communities still regard farming as a key occupation that strengthens household and community ties. Small farms provide a social foundation for family structures and the socialization of children. Through these shared agricultural experiences, farming families build a collective identity, reinforcing social, ethnic, and religious bonds.

=== Dog breeding ===
Amish and Mennonite communities across many states have turned to dog breeding as a lucrative source of income. According to the USDA list of licensees, over 98% of Ohio's puppy mills are run by the Amish, as are 97% of Indiana's, and 63% of Pennsylvania's. In Lancaster County, Pennsylvania, there are roughly 300 licensed breeders, and an estimated further 600 unlicensed breeding facilities.

The controversies surrounding the Amish and the exploitation of animals extend beyond the cruelty of puppy mills. Amish draft horses in poor condition appear regularly at auctions to be sold for meat after a hard working life, often lame and emaciated. Reports of animal abuse are also common.

== Subgroups ==
The Amish fall into three main subgroups—the Old Order Amish, the New Order Amish, and the Amish Mennonites—all of whom wear plain dress and live their life according to the Bible as codified in their church's Ordnung. The Old Order Amish, the New Order Amish and the Old Beachy Amish conduct their worship in German, speak Pennsylvania German or two other German dialects, and use buggies for transportation (except for the Old Beachy and Kauffman Amish Mennonites), in contrast to the Beachy Amish who use modern technology (inclusive of motor cars) and conduct worship in the local language of the area in which they reside. Both the New Order Amish and the Beachy Amish emphasize the New Birth, evangelize to seek converts, and have Sunday schools.

Over the years, the Amish churches have divided many times mostly over questions concerning the Ordnung, but also over doctrinal disputes, mainly about shunning. The largest group, the "Old Order" Amish, a conservative faction that separated from other Amish in the 1860s, are those who have most emphasized traditional practices and beliefs. The New Order Amish are a group of Amish whom some scholars see best described as a subgroup of Old Order Amish, despite the name.

=== Amish groups ===
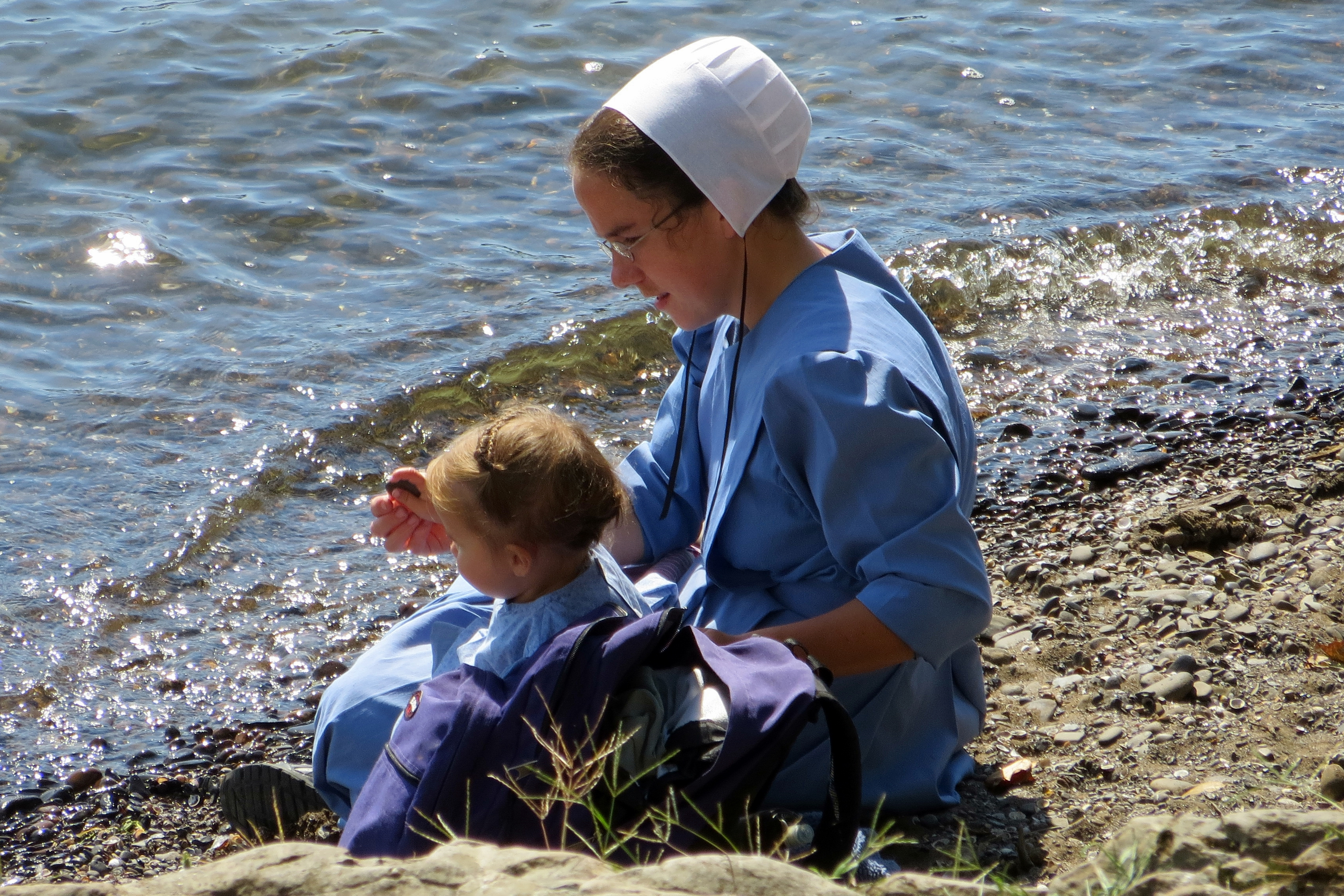
Amish mother and child in Chapman Township, Snyder County, Pennsylvania

- Old Order Amish
  - Nebraska Amish
  - Swartzentruber Amish
  - Buchanan Amish
  - Swiss Amish
  - Andy Weaver Amish
  - Troyer Amish
  - Byler Amish
  - Renno Amish
  - Holmes Old Order Amish
  - Elkhart-LaGrange Amish
  - Lancaster Amish
  - Tobe Amish
  - Michigan Amish
- New Order Amish

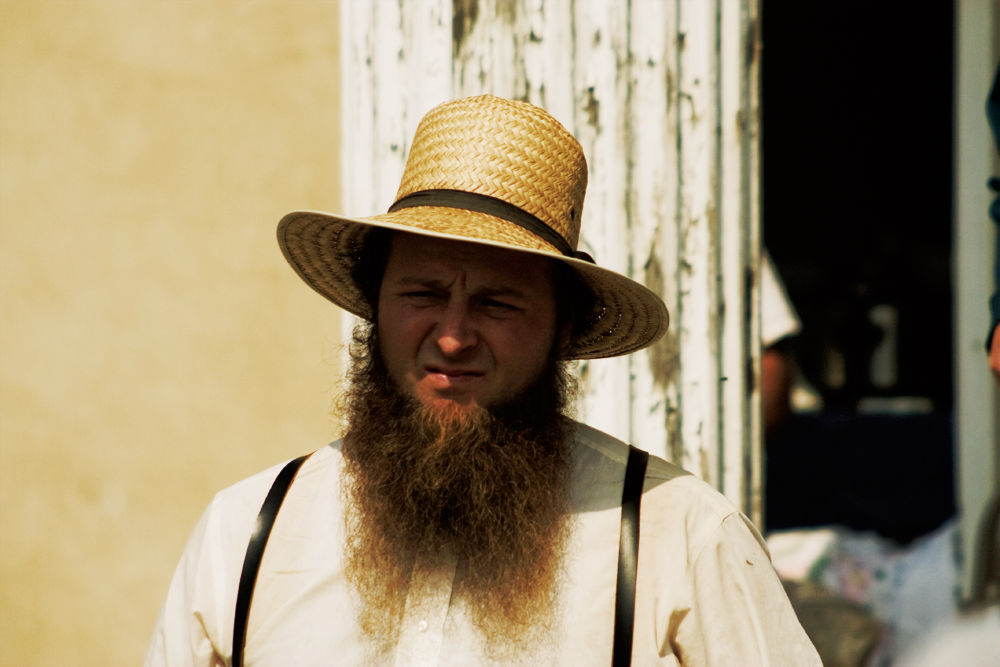
Amish man

- Amish Mennonites
  - Old Beachy Amish
  - Kauffman Amish Mennonites
  - Beachy Amish (lost many Amish features)
  - Egli Amish (historic)
  - Stuckey Amish (historic)
- Para-Amish groups
  - Lobelville Believers in Christ
  - Le Roy Plain Community (historic)
  - Manton Plain Community (joined the Michigan Amish)
  - Ghent Plain Community (historic)
  - Christian Communities (historic)
  - Vernon Community
  - Caneyville Christian Community (historic)

=== Affiliations ===
Amish woman from Lancaster County serving pretzels

As of 2011, about 40 different Old Order Amish affiliations were known to exist. The eight major affiliations of the Old Order Amish are listed below, with Lancaster as the largest one in number of districts and population:

Affiliation	Date established	Origin	States	Settlements	Church districts
Lancaster	1760	Pennsylvania	8	37	291
Elkhart-LaGrange	1841	Indiana	3	9	176
Holmes Old Order	1808	Ohio	1	2	147
Buchanan/Medford	1914	Indiana	19	67	140
Geauga I	1886	Ohio	6	11	113
Swartzentruber	1913	Ohio	15	43	119
Geauga II	1962	Ohio	4	27	99
Swiss (Adams)	1850	Indiana	5	15	86

=== Use of technology by different affiliations ===
The table below indicates the use of certain technologies by different Amish affiliations as of 2018. The use of cars is not allowed by any Old or New Order Amish, nor are radio, television, or in most cases the use of the Internet. Three affiliations—"Lancaster", "Holmes Old Order" and "Elkhart-LaGrange"—are not only the three largest affiliations but also represent the mainstream among the Old Order Amish. The most conservative affiliations are at the top, the most modern ones at the bottom. Technologies used by very few are on the left; the ones used by most are on the right. The percentage of all Amish who use a technology is also indicated approximately. The Old Order Amish culture involves lower greenhouse gas emissions in all sectors and activities with the exception of diet, and their per-person emissions have been estimated to be less than one quarter that of the wider society.

Affiliation	Tractor for fieldwork	Roto-tiller	Power lawn mower	Propane gas	Bulk milk tank	Mechanical milker	Mechanical refrigerator	Pickup balers	Inside flush toilet	Running water bath tub	Tractor for belt power	Pneumatic tools	Chain saw	Pressurized lamps	Motorized washing machines
Swartzentruber	No	No	No	No	No	No	No	No	No	No	No	Some	No	No	Yes
Nebraska	No	No	No	No	No	No	No	Some	No	No	No	No	Some	No	Yes
Swiss (Adams)	No	No	Some	No	No	No	No	No	Some	No	No	Some	Some	Some	Some
Buchanan/Medford	No	No	No	No	No	No	No	No	No	No	No	Some	No	Yes	Yes
Danner	No	No	No	Some	No	No	Some	No	Yes	Yes	Yes	No	No	Yes	No
Geauga I	No	No	No	No	No	No	No	Some	Yes	Yes	Yes	Yes	Yes	Yes	Yes
Holmes	No	Some	Some	No	No	No	Some	Yes	Yes	Yes	Yes	Yes	Yes	Yes	Yes
Elkhart-LaGrange	No	Some	Some	Some	Some	Some	Some	Some	Yes	Yes	Yes	Yes	Yes	Yes	Yes
Lancaster	No	No	Some	Yes	No	Yes	Yes	Yes	Yes	Yes	Yes	Yes	Yes	Yes	Yes
Nappanee	No	Yes	Yes	Yes	Yes	Yes	Yes	Yes	Yes	Yes	Yes	Yes	Yes	Yes	Yes
Kalona	Yes	Yes	Yes	Yes	Yes	Yes	Yes	Yes	Yes	Yes	Yes	Yes	Yes	Yes	Yes
Percentage of use by all Amish	6	20	25	30	35	35	40	50	70	70	70	70	75	90	97

=== Language ===
Most Old Order Amish, all New Order Amish, all Old Beachy Amish and most Kauffman Amish Mennonites speak Pennsylvania Dutch, and refer to non-Amish people as "English", regardless of ethnicity. Two Old Order Amish subgroups – called Swiss Amish – whose ancestors migrated to the United States in the 1850s speak a form of Bernese German (Adams County, Indiana, and daughter settlements) or a Low Alemannic Alsatian dialect (Allen County, IN and daughter settlements).

Contrary to popular belief, the word "Dutch" in "Pennsylvania Dutch" is not a mistranslation, but rather a corruption of the Pennsylvania German endonym Deitsch, which means "Pennsylvania Dutch / German" or "German". Ultimately, the terms Deitsch, Dutch, Diets and Deutsch are all cognates and descend from the Proto-Germanic word *þiudiskaz meaning "popular" or "of the people". The continued use of "Pennsylvania Dutch" was strengthened by the Pennsylvania Dutch in the 19th century as a way of distinguishing themselves from later (post 1830) waves of German immigrants to the United States, with the Pennsylvania Dutch referring to themselves as Deitsche and to Germans as Deitschlenner (literally "Germany-ers", compare Deutschländ-er) whom they saw as a related but distinct group.

According to one scholar, "today, almost all Amish are functionally bilingual in Pennsylvania Dutch and English; however, domains of usage are sharply separated. Pennsylvania Dutch dominates in most in-group settings, such as the dinner table and preaching in church services. In contrast, English is used for most reading and writing. English is also the medium of instruction in schools and is used in business transactions and often, out of politeness, in situations involving interactions with non-Amish. Finally, the Amish read prayers and sing in Standard German (which, in Pennsylvania Dutch, is called Hochdeitsch (Note: Hochdeitsch is the Pennsylvania Dutch equivalent of the Standard German word Hochdeutsch; both words literally mean "High German".)) at church services. The distinctive use of three different languages serves as a powerful conveyor of Amish identity. "Although 'the English language is being used in more and more situations,' Pennsylvania Dutch is 'one of a handful of minority languages in the United States that is neither endangered nor supported by continual arrivals of immigrants.'"

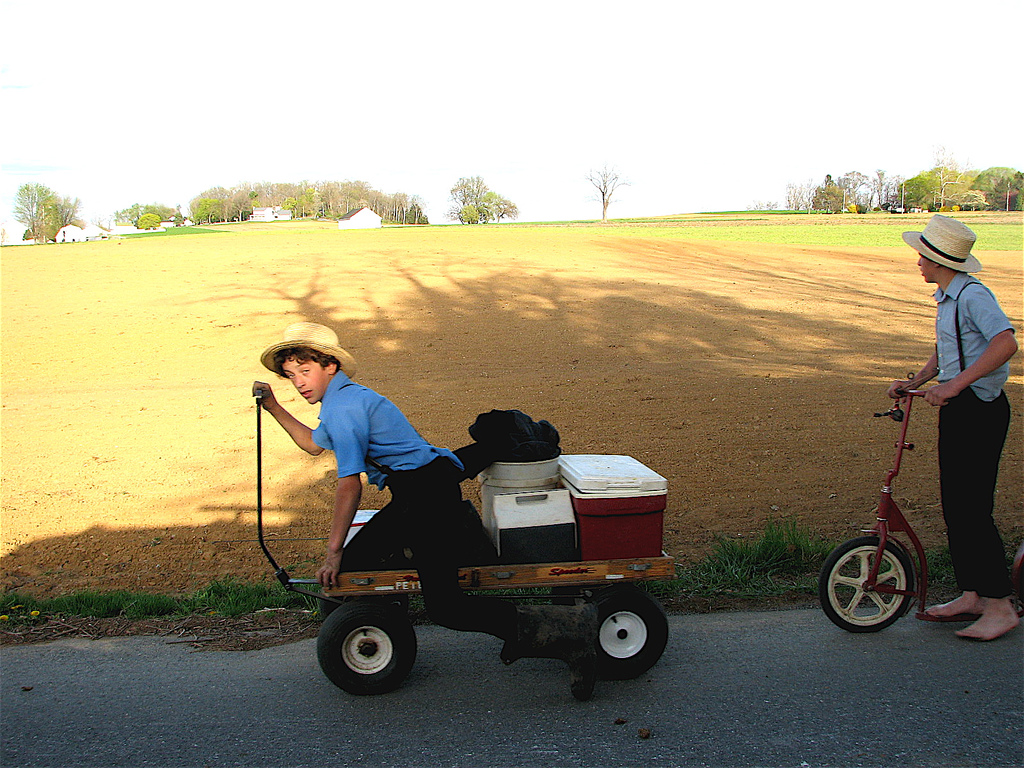
Amish boys

=== Ethnicity ===
The Amish largely share a German or Swiss-German ancestry. They generally use the term "Amish" only for members of their faith community and not as an ethnic designation. However some Amish descendants recognize their cultural background knowing that their genetic and cultural traits are uniquely different from other ethnicities. Those who choose to affiliate with the church, or young children raised in Amish homes, but too young to yet be church members, are considered to be Amish. Certain Mennonite churches have a high number of people who were formerly from Amish congregations. Although more Amish immigrated to North America in the 19th century than during the 18th century, most of today's Amish descend from 18th-century immigrants. The latter tended to emphasize tradition to a greater extent, and were perhaps more likely to maintain a separate Amish identity. There are a number of Amish Mennonite church groups that had never in their history been associated with the Old Order Amish because they split from the Amish mainstream in the time when the Old Orders formed in the 1860s and 1870s. The former Western Ontario Mennonite Conference (WOMC) was made up almost entirely of former Amish Mennonites who reunited with the Mennonite Church in Canada. Orland Gingerich's book The Amish of Canada devotes the vast majority of its pages not to the Beachy or Old Order Amish, but to congregations in the former WOMC.

=== Para-Amish groups ===
Several other groups, called "para-Amish" by G. C. Waldrep and others, share many characteristics with the Amish, such as horse-and-buggy transportation, plain dress, and the preservation of the German language. The members of these groups are largely of Amish origin, but they are not in fellowship with other Amish groups because they adhere to theological doctrines (e.g., assurance of salvation) or practices (community of goods) that are normally not accepted among mainstream Amish. The Bergholz Community is a different case; it is not seen as Amish anymore because the community has shifted away from many core Amish principles.

== Population and distribution ==
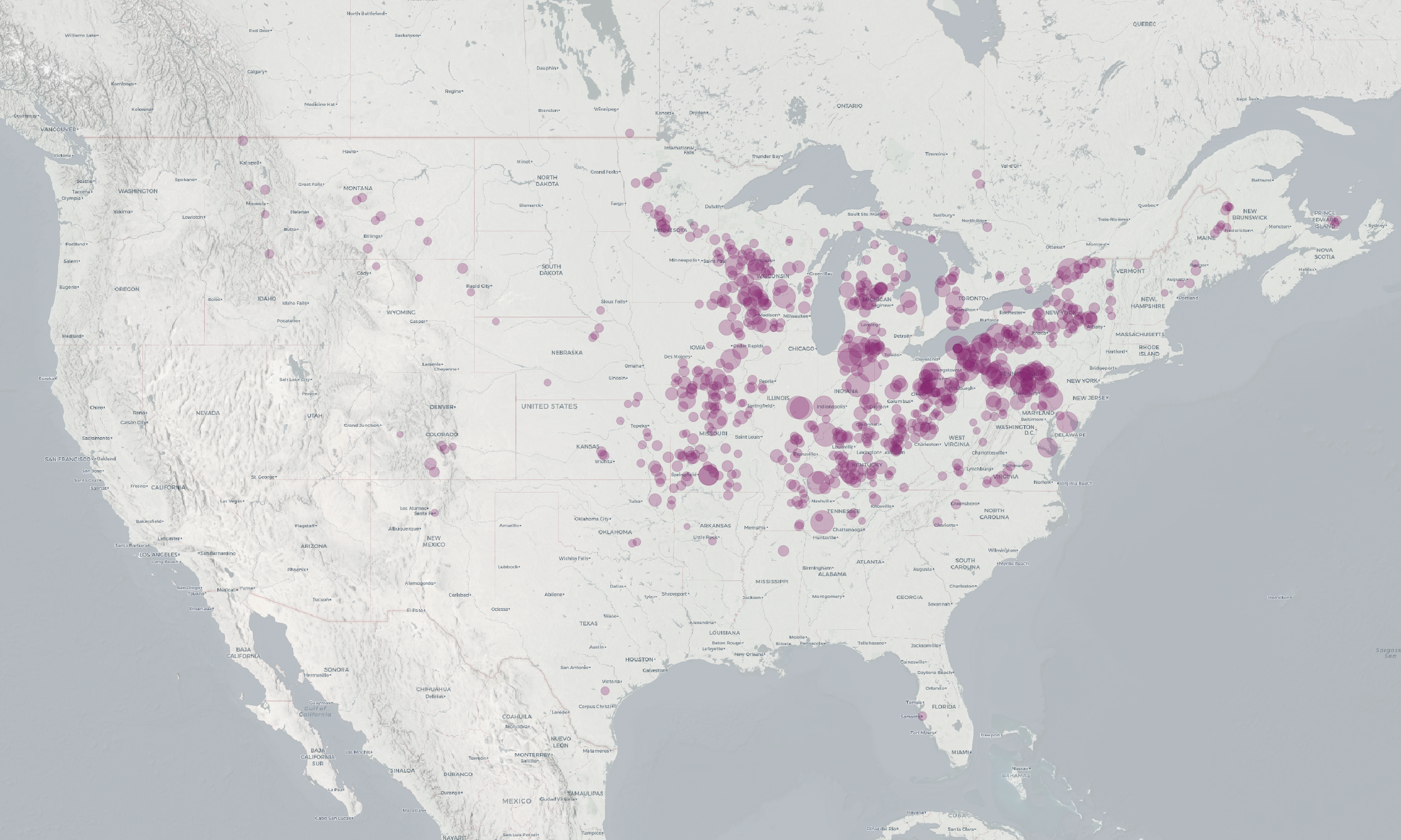
Amish settlements in the United States and Canada, 2022

Historical population
Year	Pop.	±% p.a.
1920	5,000	—
1928	7,000	+4.30%
1936	9,000	+3.19%
1944	13,000	+4.70%
1952	19,000	+4.86%
1960	28,000	+4.97%
1968	39,000	+4.23%
1976	57,000	+4.86%
1984	84,000	+4.97%
1992	128,150	+5.42%
2000	166,000	+3.29%
2010	249,500	+4.16%
2020	350,665	+3.46%
2026	421,340	+3.11%
Source: 1992, 2000, 2010, 2020, 2026

Because the Amish are usually baptized no earlier than 18 and children are not counted in local congregation numbers, estimating their numbers is difficult. Rough estimates from various studies placed their numbers at 125,000 in 1992, 166,000 in 2000, and 221,000 in 2008. Thus, from 1992 to 2008, population growth among the Amish in North America was 84 percent (3.6 percent per year). During that time, they established 184 new settlements and moved into six new states. In 2000, about 165,620 Old Order Amish resided in the United States, of whom 73,609 were church members. The Amish are among the fastest-growing populations in the world, with an average of seven children per family in the 1970s and a total fertility rate of 5.3 in the 2010s. Due to this, their population doubles in size roughly every 20 years.

In 2010, a few religious bodies, including the Amish, changed the way their adherents were reported to better match the standards of the Association of Statisticians of American Religious Bodies. When looking at all Amish adherents and not solely Old Order Amish, about 241,000 Amish adherents were in 28 U.S. states in 2010.

The Amish added more than 100,000 adherents in just 9 years, reaching over 421,000 in 2026 in comparison with the 318,000 figure from 2017, at the same time the total number of settlements grew from 530 to 728 (+37%), and the number of districts went from 2,364 to 3,287 (+39%).

=== Distribution by country ===
==== United States ====
Amish population by U.S. state and year
State	1992	2000	2010	2020	2026
Pennsylvania	32,710	44,620	59,350	81,500	96,535
Ohio	34,830	48,545	58,590	78,280	87,760
Indiana	23,400	32,840	43,710	59,305	68,025
Wisconsin	6,785	9,390	15,360	22,235	28,940
New York	4,050	4,505	12,015	21,230	26,320
Michigan	5,150	8,495	11,350	16,525	21,110
Missouri	3,745	5,480	9,475	14,520	19,360
Kentucky	2,625	4,850	7,750	13,595	17,220
Iowa	3,525	4,445	7,190	9,780	11,140

The United States is the home to the overwhelming majority (over 98 percent) of Amish people. In 2026, Old Order communities were present in 33 U.S. states. The total Amish population in the United States as of June 2026 has stood at 414,545, up 9,970 (2.5 percent) from the previous year. Pennsylvania has the largest population (96.5 thousand), followed by Ohio (87.8 thousand) and Indiana (68 thousand), as of June 2026. The largest Amish settlements are in Lancaster County in southeastern Pennsylvania (45.6 thousand), Holmes County and adjacent counties in northeastern Ohio (38.8 thousand), and Elkhart and LaGrange counties in northeastern Indiana (30.8 thousand), as of June 2026. The highest concentration of Amish in the world is in the Holmes County community; nearly 50 percent of the entire population of Holmes County is Amish as of 2010.

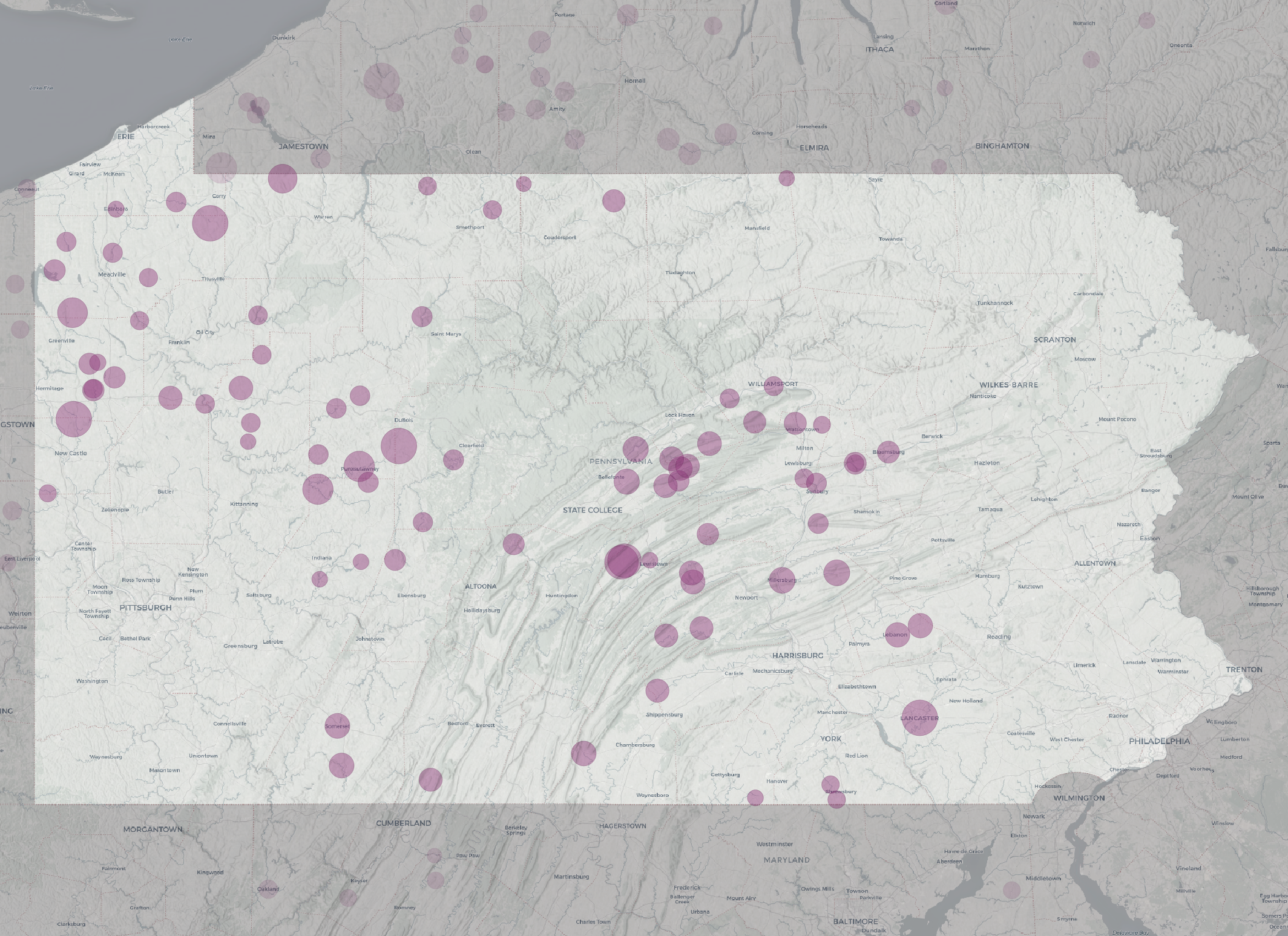
Amish settlements as of 2022 in Pennsylvania, the state with the largest Amish population in the U.S.

The largest concentration of Amish west of the Mississippi River is in Missouri, with other settlements in eastern Iowa and southeast Minnesota. The largest Amish settlements in Iowa are located near Kalona and Bloomfield. The largest settlement in Wisconsin is near Cashton with 13 congregations, i.e. about 2,800 people in 2026.

Because of the rapid population growth of the Amish communities, new settlements in the United States are being established each year, thus: 18 new settlements were established in 2016, 22 in 2017, 17 in 2018, 26 in 2019, 26 in 2020, 18 in 2021, 20 in 2022, 40 in 2023, 23 in 2024 and 36 in 2025. The main reason for the continuous expansion is to obtain enough affordable farmland, other reasons for new settlements include locating in isolated areas that support their lifestyle, moving to areas with cultures conducive to their way of life, maintaining proximity to family or other Amish groups, and sometimes to resolve church or leadership conflicts.

The adjacent table shows the eight states with the largest Amish population in the years 1992, 2000, 2010, 2020 and 2026.

==== Canada ====
The Amish of Canada settled in southwestern Ontario, having come from the United States in 1815 and directly from Europe in 1822. They numbered about 1,000 people in 1991. Today, the Canadian Amish population exceeds 6,000 people, living in 20 different communities.

Rising land prices are causing some Amish families to leave Ontario. Since 2015, some Amish families have settled in provinces other than Ontario, including Manitoba, New Brunswick, and Prince Edward Island, primarily due to farmland prices, the geography of existing Amish settlements in both Canada and the United States, and the political hospitality of certain provinces. Since 2017, some Amish families originally from Ontario have settled in Manitoba's Rural Municipality of Stuartburn.

The Old Order Amish in Canada trace their origins to two distinct waves of Amish Mennonite migration. The first wave occurred in the 1880s, when a group of Amish Mennonites from Europe settled in Ontario. The second wave of Old Order Amish migration occurred in the 1950s, when Amish communities from states such as Ohio, Pennsylvania, and Iowa established settlements in Ontario.

Amish population by Canadian province and year
Canada	1992	2010	2020	2026
All of Canada	2,295	4,725	5,995	6,655
Ontario	2,295	4,725	5,605	6,135
Prince Edward Isl.	0	0	250	330
New Brunswick	0	0	70	190

The majority of Old Order settlements are located in the province of Ontario, namely Oxford (Norwich Township) and Norfolk Counties. A small community is also established in Bruce County (Huron-Kinloss Township) near Lucknow.

In 2016, several dozen Old Order Amish families founded two new settlements in Kings County in the province of Prince Edward Island. Increasing land prices in Ontario had reportedly limited the ability of members in those communities to purchase new farms. At about the same time a new settlement was founded near Perth-Andover in New Brunswick, only about 12 km (7.5 mi) from Amish settlements in Maine. In 2017, an Amish settlement was founded in Manitoba near Stuartburn. In 2024 this colony ceased to exist, as the Amish have sold their properties and moved to Minnesota.

==== Latin America ====
There are two colonies in Latin America, one in Bolivia and a new one in Campeche, Mexico which has about 35 people and belongs to the New Order Amish. There was one in Argentina that ceased to exist as of 2024. The first attempt by Old Order Amish to settle in Latin America was in Paradise Valley, near Galeana, Nuevo León, Mexico, but the settlement lasted from only 1923 to 1929. An Amish settlement was tried in Honduras from about 1968 to 1978, but this settlement failed too. In 2015, new settlements of New Order Amish were founded east of Catamarca, Argentina, and Colonia Naranjita, Bolivia, about 75 miles (121 km) southwest of Santa Cruz. Most of the members of these new communities come from Old Colony Mennonite background and have been living in the area for several decades.

==== Europe ====
In Europe, no split occurred between Old Order Amish and Amish Mennonites; like the Amish Mennonites in North America, the European Amish assimilated into the Mennonite mainstream during the second half of the 19th century through the first decades of the 20th century. Eventually, they dropped the word "Amish" from the names of their congregations and lost their Amish identity and culture. The last European Amish congregation joined the Mennonites in 1937 in Ixheim, today part of Zweibrücken in the Palatinate region.

== Seekers and joiners ==
Only a few hundred outsiders, so-called seekers, have ever joined the Old Order Amish. Since 1950, only some 75 non-Anabaptist people have joined and remained lifelong members of the Amish. Since 1990, some twenty people of Russian Mennonite background have joined the Amish in Aylmer, Ontario.

Two whole Christian communities have joined the Amish: the church at Smyrna, Maine, one of the five Christian Communities of Elmo Stoll after Stoll's death and the church at Manton, Michigan, which belonged to a community that was founded by Harry Wanner (1935–2012), a minister of Stauffer Old Order Mennonite background. The "Michigan Amish Churches", with which Smyrna and Manton affiliated, are said to be more open to seekers and converts than other Amish churches. Most of the members of these two para-Amish communities originally came from plain churches, i.e., Old Order Amish, Old Order Mennonite, or Old German Baptist Brethren.

More people have tested Old Order Amish life for weeks, months, or even years, but in the end decided not to join. Others remain close to the Amish, but never think of joining.

On the other hand, the Beachy Amish, many of whom conduct their services in English and allow for a limited range of modern conveniences, regularly receive seekers into their churches as visitors, and eventually, as members.

Stephen Scott, himself a convert to the Old Order River Brethren, distinguishes four types of seekers:

- Checklist seekers are looking for a few certain specifications.
- Cultural seekers are more enchanted with the lifestyle of the Amish than with their religion.
- Spiritual utopian seekers are looking for true New Testament Christianity.
- Stability seekers come with emotional issues, often from dysfunctional families.

Various congregations belonging to Old Order Anabaptism and Conservative Anabaptism lend support to Christian Aid Ministries, a missionary arm of these movements, along with Iron Curtain and Freiheit Messengers Prison Ministry.

== Health ==
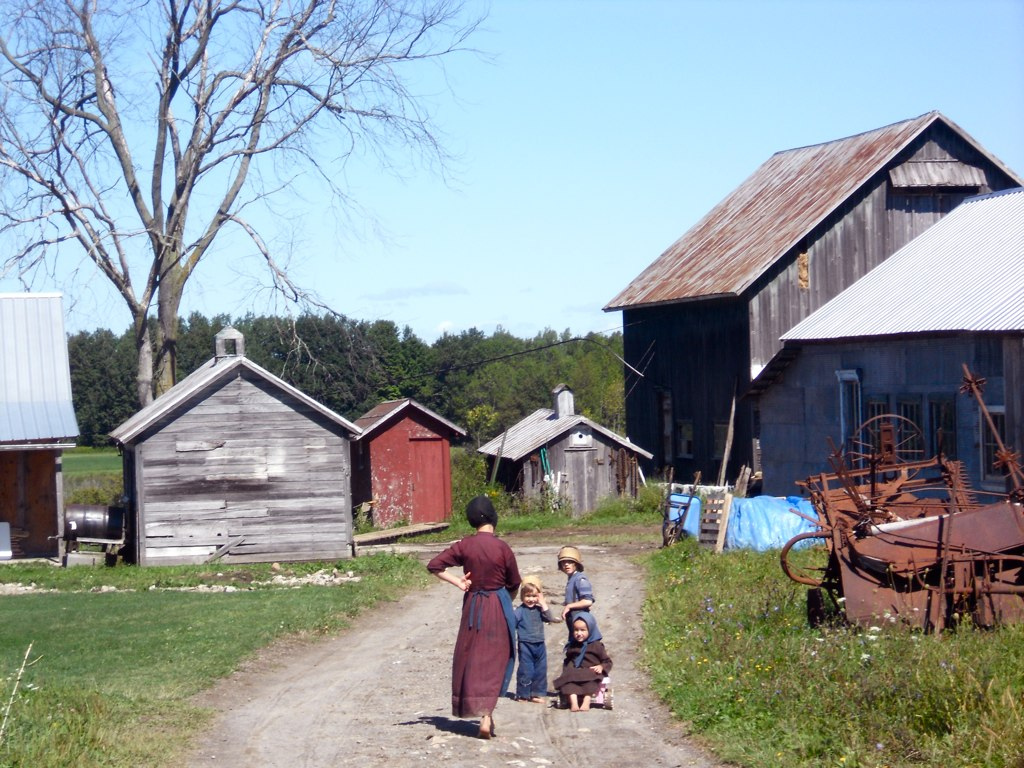
Amish farm near Morristown, New York

A 2016 study on Amish community funding for health care

Amish populations have higher incidences of particular conditions, including dwarfism, Angelman syndrome, and various metabolic disorders, as well as an unusual distribution of blood types (a higher frequency of A type blood, and a lower frequency of O type blood). The Amish represent a collection of different demes or genetically closed communities. Although the Amish do not have higher incidence of genetic disorders than the general population, since almost all Amish descend from a few hundred 18th-century founders, some recessive conditions are more prevalent (an example of the founder effect). Some of these disorders, such as Amish lethal microcephaly, are rare or unique, and are serious enough to increase the mortality rate among Amish children.

The Amish are aware of the advantages of exogamy, but for religious reasons, marry only within their communities. The majority of Amish accept these disorders as Gottes Wille (God's will). They reject the use of both preventive genetic screening prior to marriage and genetic testing of unborn children to discover genetic disorders. When children are born with a disorder, they are accepted into the community and tasked with chores within their ability. However, Amish are willing to participate in studies of genetic diseases. Their extensive family histories are useful to researchers investigating diseases such as Alzheimer's, Parkinson's, and macular degeneration.

While the Amish are at an increased risk for some genetic disorders, researchers have found their tendency for clean living can lead to better health. Overall cancer rates in the Amish are reduced and tobacco-related cancers in Amish adults are 37 percent and non-tobacco-related cancers are 72 percent of the rate for Ohio adults. Skin cancer rates are lower for Amish, even though many Amish make their living working outdoors where they are exposed to sunlight. They are typically covered and dressed by wearing wide-brimmed hats and long sleeves which protect their skin.

Treating genetic problems is the mission of Clinic for Special Children in Strasburg, Pennsylvania, which has developed effective treatments for such problems as maple syrup urine disease, which once was fatal. The clinic is embraced by most Amish, ending the need for parents to leave the community to receive proper care for their children, an action that might result in shunning. Another clinic is DDC Clinic for Special Needs Children, located in Middlefield, Ohio, for special-needs children with inherited or metabolic disorders. The DDC Clinic provides treatment, research, and educational services to Amish and non-Amish children and their families.

People's Helpers is an Amish-organized network of mental health caregivers who help families dealing with mental illness and recommend professional counselors. Suicide rates for the Amish are about half that of the general population. (Note: The overall suicide rate in 1980 in the US was 12.5 per 100,000.)

The Old Order Amish do not typically carry private commercial health insurance. A handful of American hospitals, starting in the mid-1990s, created special outreach programs to assist the Amish. In some Amish communities, the church will collect money from its members to help pay for medical bills of other members. Although the Amish are often perceived by outsiders as rejecting all modern technologies, this is not the case and modern medicine is employed by Amish communities, including hospital births and other advanced treatments. As they go without health insurance and pay up front for services, Amish individuals will often travel to Mexico for non-urgent care and surgery to reduce costs.

Amish typically have a large number of children, not because of any lack of birth control but because of their beliefs and because large families are useful in agrarian communities. Comparing the number of children per family across multiple communities, it is clear that some Amish seem to practice some form of family planning, a subject that generally is not discussed among the Amish, because the size of families increases in correlation with the conservatism of a congregation—the more conservative, the more children. Some communities openly allow access to birth control to women whose health would be compromised by childbirth. The Amish are against abortion and also find "artificial insemination, genetics, eugenics, and stem cell research" to be "inconsistent with Amish values and beliefs".

== Life in the modern world ==
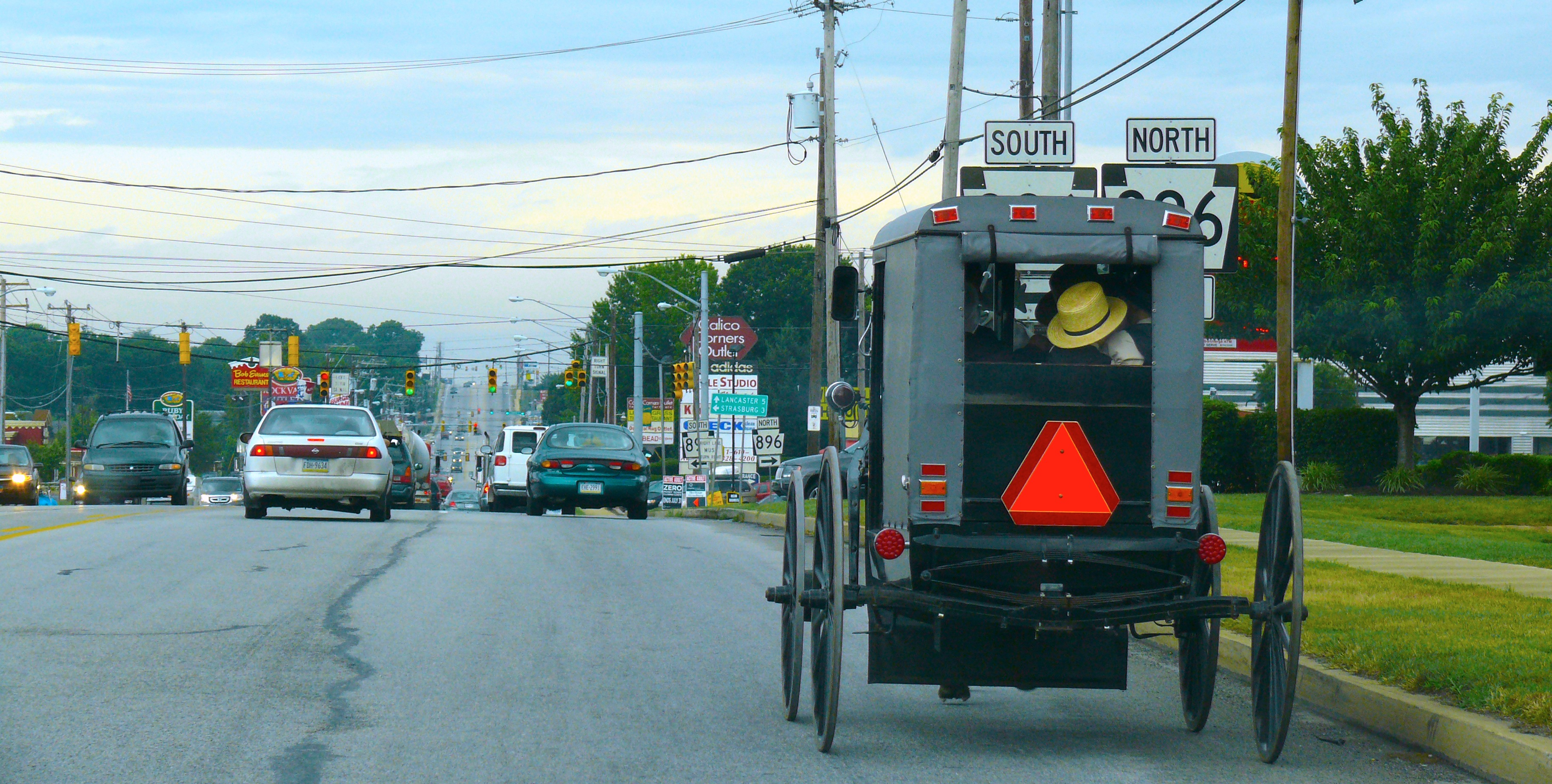
Traditional, Lancaster style Amish buggy

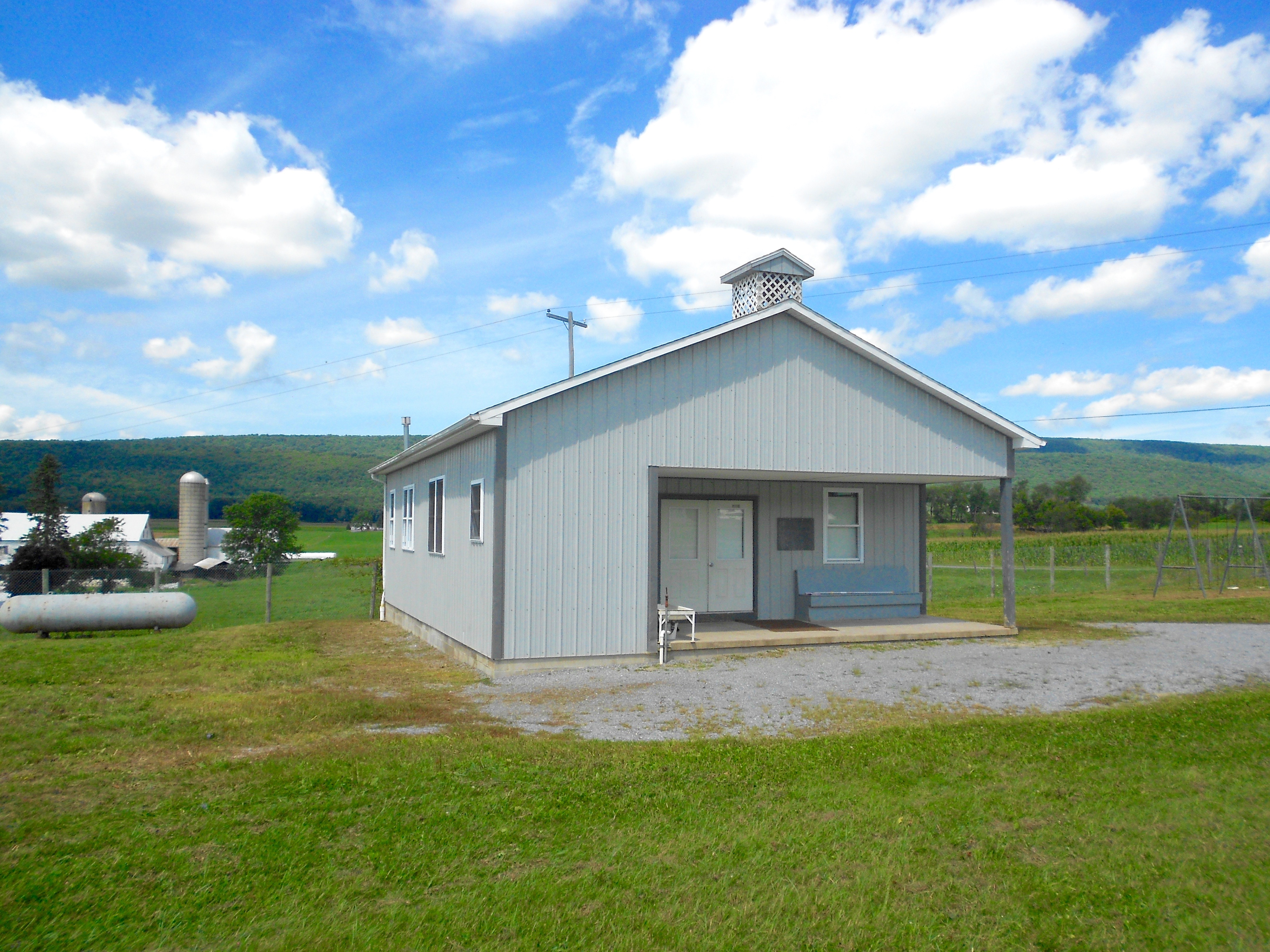
Amish school near Rebersburg, Pennsylvania

As time has passed, the Amish have felt pressures from the modern world. Issues such as taxation, education, law and its enforcement, and occasional discrimination and hostility are areas of difficulty.

The modern way of life in general has increasingly diverged from that of Amish society. On occasion, this has resulted in sporadic discrimination and hostility from their neighbors, such as throwing of stones or other objects at Amish horse-drawn carriages on the roads.

The Amish do not usually educate their children past the eighth grade, believing that the basic knowledge offered up to that point is sufficient to prepare one for the Amish lifestyle. Almost no Amish go to high school and college. In many communities, the Amish operate their own schools, which are typically one-room schoolhouses with teachers (usually young, unmarried women) from the Amish community. On May 19, 1972, Jonas Yoder and Wallace Miller of the Old Order Amish, and Adin Yutzy of the Conservative Amish Mennonite Church were each fined $5 for refusing to send their children, aged 14 and 15, to high school. In Wisconsin v. Yoder (1972), the Wisconsin Supreme Court overturned the conviction, and the U.S. Supreme Court affirmed this, finding the benefits of universal education were not sufficient justification to overcome scrutiny under the Free Exercise Clause of the First Amendment.

The Amish are subject to sales and property taxes. As they seldom own motor vehicles, they rarely have occasion to pay motor vehicle registration fees or spend money on the purchase of fuel for vehicles. Under their beliefs and traditions, generally the Amish do not agree with the idea of Social Security benefits and have a religious objection to insurance. On this basis, the United States Internal Revenue Service agreed in 1961 that they did not need to pay Social Security-related taxes. In 1965, this policy was codified into law. Self-employed individuals in certain affiliations do not pay into or receive benefits from the United States Social Security system. This exemption applies to a religious group that is conscientiously opposed to accepting benefits of any private or public insurance, provides a reasonable level of living for its dependent members, and has existed continuously since December 31, 1950. The U.S. Supreme Court clarified in 1982 that Amish employers are not exempt, but only those Amish individuals who are self-employed.

== Publishing ==
In 1964, Pathway Publishers was founded by two Amish farmers to print more material about the Amish and Anabaptists in general. It is located in LaGrange, Indiana, and Aylmer, Ontario. Pathway has become the major publisher of Amish school textbooks, general-reading books, and periodicals. Also, a number of private enterprises publish everything from general reading to reprints of older literature that has been considered of great value to Amish families. Some Amish read the Pennsylvania German newspaper Hiwwe wie Driwwe, and some of them even contribute dialect texts.

== Similar groups ==
Anabaptist groups that sprang from the same late 19th-century Old Order Movement as the Amish share their Pennsylvania German heritage and often still retain similar features in dress. These Old Order groups include different subgroups of Old Order Mennonites, traditional Schwarzenau Brethren and Old Order River Brethren. The Noah Hoover Old Order Mennonites are so similar in outward aspects to the Old Order Amish, including dress, beards, horse and buggy, extreme restrictions on modern technology, Pennsylvania German language, that they are often perceived as Amish and even called Amish.

Conservative "Russian" Mennonites and Hutterites who also dress plain and speak German dialects emigrated from other European regions at different times with different German dialects, separate cultures, and related but different religious traditions. Particularly, the Hutterites live communally and are generally accepting of modern technology.

In western Ukraine, the Kashketnyky have been compared to the Amish, due to their similar beliefs of plain living and pacifism.

The few remaining Plain Quakers are similar in manner and lifestyle, including their attitudes toward war, but are unrelated to the Amish. Early Quakers were influenced, to some degree, by the Anabaptists, and in turn influenced the Amish in colonial Pennsylvania. Almost all modern Quakers have since abandoned their traditional dress.

== Relations with Native Americans ==
The Northkill Amish Settlement, established in 1740 in Berks County, Pennsylvania, was the first identifiable Amish community in the New World. During the French and Indian War, the Hochstetler Massacre occurred: Local tribes attacked the Jacob Hochstetler homestead in the Northkill settlement on September 19, 1757. The sons of the family took their weapons but father Jacob did not allow them to shoot due to the Anabaptist doctrine of nonresistance. Jacob Sr.'s wife, Anna (Lorentz) Hochstetler, a daughter (name unknown) and Jacob Jr. were killed by the Native Americans. Jacob Sr. and sons Joseph and Christian were taken captive. Jacob escaped after about eight months, but the boys were held for several years. When freed, both of these sons joined the church and one of them became a minister.

As early as 1809, Amish were farming side by side with Native American farmers in Pennsylvania. According to Cones Kupwah Snowflower, a Shawnee genealogist, the Amish and Quakers were known to incorporate Native Americans into their families to protect them from ill-treatment, especially after the Removal Act of 1832.

The Amish, as pacifists, did not engage in warfare with Native Americans, nor displace them directly, but were among the European immigrants whose arrival resulted in their displacement.

In 2012, the Lancaster Mennonite Historical Society collaborated with the Native American community to construct a replica Iroquois Longhouse. The following years saw continuous efforts to meet with local Indigenous people in a series of reconciliation meetings, a process started by Lancaster Mennonites more than a decade prior.

== See also ==
- Amish and Mennonite Heritage Center
- Amish furniture
- Amish music
- Barn raising
- Bank of Bird-in-Hand
- Christian views on poverty and wealth
- Fancy Dutch
- Kashketnyky, colloquially referred to as the Ukrainian Amish
- Hutterites
- List of Amish and their descendants
- Martyr's Mirror
- Mennonites
- Neo-Luddism
- Pinecraft
- Plain people
- West Nickel Mines School shooting

== Bibliography ==
- Hamm, Thomas D. (2003). The Quakers in America. Columbia University Press. ISBN 978-0-231-50893-3.
- Hostetler, John (1993), Amish Society (4th ed.), Baltimore, Maryland; London: Johns Hopkins University Press, ISBN 978-0-8018-4442-3.
- Kraybill, Donald B (1994), Olshan, Marc A (ed.), The Amish Struggle with Modernity, Hanover, NH: University Press of New England, ISBN 0-87451-684-6.
- Kraybill, Donald B, The Anabaptist Escalator.
- ——— (2001) [2000], Anabaptist World USA, Herald Press, ISBN 978-0-8361-9163-9.
- ——— (2001), The Riddle of Amish Culture (revised ed.), JHU Press, ISBN 978-0-8018-6772-9.
- Nolt, Steven M. (1992), A History of the Amish, Intercourse: Good Books.
- "Swiss Amish", Amish America, Type pad, archived from the original on March 2, 2009.
