= Fellowship of Evangelical Churches =

- Location: 6535 Maplecrest Road; Fort Wayne, Indiana 46835
- Country: United States
- Denomination: Evangelical
- Churchmanship: 9,777 congregants (2020)
- Website: fecministries.com

History
- Former name(s): Egly-Amish, Defenseless Mennonites, Evangelical Mennonite Church
- Founded: 1866
- Events: FEC Conference (annual)

The Fellowship of Evangelical Churches (FEC) is an evangelical body of Christians with an Amish Mennonite heritage that is headquartered in Fort Wayne, Indiana, United States. It contains 46 churches located in Colorado, Idaho, Illinois, Indiana, Kansas, Maine, Michigan, Minnesota, Missouri, Ohio, and Pennsylvania.

== History ==
=== Beginnings as Egly Amish ===
In the first half of the 19th century, the time before the Amish split into Amish Mennonites and Old Order Amish, several members of the Amish Egly family immigrated from Baden, Germany, to North America. Among them was Henry Egly (1824–1890). Egly was elected deacon of a Berne-Geneva Amish church in Indiana. In 1858, Egly was then elected bishop of the Berne-Geneva Amish Church. Egly, who insisted on the new birth experience, withdrew from the Amish church. Approximately half of the congregation withdrew as well. In 1866, the first Egly-Amish church was created in Berne, Indiana. In the beginning the Egly Amish church was very strict in regard to discipline and dress, but later developed in the same direction as the Amish Mennonites, that is towards the Mennonite mainstream, away from the Amish heritage.

=== Defenseless Mennonites ===
The Egly-Amish officially adopted the name "Defenseless Mennonite" on 6 November 1908 as the congregation wanted to be known as more Mennonite rather than Amish.

=== Evangelical Mennonite Church ===
In 1942, the Defenseless Mennonites were charter members in the founding of the National Association of Evangelicals. Later, in 1948, their name was changed to "Evangelical Mennonite Church" to reflect both their Anabaptist and Evangelical beliefs.

=== Fellowship of Evangelical Churches ===
On 2 August 2003, the Evangelical Mennonite Church voted to be known as the "Fellowship of Evangelical Churches", or FEC.

== Doctrine ==
The Defenseless Mennonite Conference published its Confession of Faith, Rules and Discipline in 1917. The confession of faith was revised in 1937, 1949, 1961, and 1980. It contains 12 articles of faith. The Lord's Supper is observed with open communion.

== Organization ==
The conference office is located in Fort Wayne, Indiana. The FEC organization is governed through a congregational form of governance. Local congregations elect delegates to a delegate body, which in turn elects the conference leadership. As of 2010, the conference was composed of 46 churches in the Midwest of the United States, with 9,193 members. 55 percent of the churches are located in Illinois and Indiana. All FEC ministries are funded by voluntary donations of congregations and individuals.

== Branches and connections ==
- The Missionary Church Association came out of the "Egly Amish" in 1898 (see Missionary Church).
- The Evangelical Mennonite Church is a member of the National Association of Evangelicals.

== Affiliated organizations ==
These organizations have their own governing boards but are affiliated solely with the Fellowship of Evangelical Churches.

- Miracle Camp and Retreat Center
- Life Change Camp and Retreat Center
- Salem4Youth
- Christian Service Foundation

== Affiliated churches ==
=== Colorado ===
- Lifegate Church

=== Idaho ===
- Lakeview Bible Church

=== Illinois ===
- Calvary Community Church
- Crossroads Church of Monticello
- Dewey Community Church
- Eureka Bible Church
- Grace Evangelical Church
- Groveland Evangelical Mennonite Church
- Heartland Community Church
- Living Hope Community Church
- New Beginnings Church
- Northwoods Community Church
- Oak Grove Evangelical Bible Church
- Salem Church

=== Indiana ===
- Berne Evangelical Church
- Brookside Church
- Crossview Church
- Highland Gospel Community
- Mission Church
- Pine Hills Church
- Pine Hills Kendallville
- Sonlight Community Church
- Upland Community Church
- Westwood Fellowship

=== Kansas ===
- Grace Community Church
- Grace Community Fellowship
- Grace Crossing
- New Anthem Community Church
- King's Cross Church

=== Maine ===
- The Hill
- Life Community Church
- Moss Brook Community Church

=== Michigan ===
- Church of the Good Shepherd
- Comins Mennonite Church
- Lawton Evangelical Church
- Neighborhood Church
- The Remedy

=== Minnesota ===
- The Real Tree Church
- True North

=== Missouri ===
- Bethel Fellowship Church
- Freedom Point
- Harrisonville Community Church
- PeaRidge Community Church

=== Ohio ===
- Archbold Evangelical Church
- Catalyst Community Church
- Christ the King Church
- Crossroads Evangelical Church
- Crossroads Church (Napoleon)
- Evermore Community Church
- Life Church of Loraine County
- Life Community Church
- Oak Bend Church
- Pathway Church
- Solid Rock Community Church
- Wave Community Church

=== Pennsylvania ===
- River City Church

== Literature ==
- Frank S. Mead, Samuel S. Hill, and Craig D. Atwood: Handbook of Denominations in the United States.
- Cornelius J. Dyck, Dennis D. Martin, et al., editors: Mennonite Encyclopedia.
- Glenmary Research Center: Religious Congregations & Membership in the United States (2000).
