= Conservative Mennonites =

Conservative Mennonite or Anabaptists

- Classification: Anabaptist
- Orientation: Mennonite
- Origin: 1956; Ontario, Canada; Ohio, Pennsylvania, Virginia, United States

Conservative Mennonites include numerous Conservative Anabaptist groups that identify with the theologically conservative element among Mennonite Anabaptist Christian fellowships, but who are not Old Order groups or mainline denominations.

Conservative Mennonites adhere to Anabaptist doctrine as contained in the Schleitheim Confession and the Dordrecht Confession, with Doctrines of the Bible compiled by Mennonite bishop Daniel Kauffman being used for catechesis. Seven Ordinances are observed in Conservative Mennonite churches, which include "baptism, communion, footwashing, marriage, anointing with oil, the holy kiss, and the prayer covering."

Conservative Mennonites have Sunday school, hold revival meetings, and operate their own Christian schools/parochial schools. Additionally, Conservative Mennonite fellowships are highly engaged in evangelism and missionary work; a 1993 report showed that Conservative Anabaptist denominations (such as Conservative Mennonites and the Dunkard Brethren Church) in general grew by fifty percent overall within the previous fifteen years. A directory of Conservative Mennonite denominations called Pilgrim Ministry is maintained by the Pilgrim Mennonite Conference.

== History ==
Many adherents of Conservative Mennonite churches historically have an Amish background, in addition to a number of congregations with a formerly mainstream Mennonite background, who then left to form or join Conservative Mennonite fellowships. Other members of Conservative Mennonite churches have joined those congregations from other religious or nonreligious backgrounds due to responding to Conservative Mennonite evangelism. The former emerged mostly from the middle group between the Old Order Amish and Amish Mennonites. For more, see Amish Mennonite: Division 1850–1878 from the Old Order Amish.

The so-called Conservative Mennonite Conference (now called the Rosedale Network of Churches), was founded as the Conservative Amish Mennonite Conference in 1910 but dropped the word "Amish" in 1954. In the 1950 they were joined by conservative withdrawals from the mainstream Mennonites. "The first of these conservative withdrawals from the Mennonite Church occurred in the 1950s, and they continued in the 1990s. Many independent single congregations developed from this exodus."

"Independently and almost simultaneously, conservative minorities in widely scattered regional Conferences of the Mennonite Church came to the point where they had had enough of what they considered compromise and apostasy. They were disenchanted with the Conference structure and its failure to deal with drift. They decided to launch out on their own." Beginning in late 1958 through 1960 a large number of individuals and congregations withdrew from various Mennonite Conferences, forming congregationally governed or independent Mennonite congregations. These later informally began what is called the Nationwide Fellowship Churches. In Ontario a group formed what is called the Conservative Mennonite Churches of Ontario or CMCO. These individuals and congregations felt that the mainstream Mennonite churches were no longer holding to the traditional and conservative values of the Mennonite Anabaptist tradition.

Many Conservative Mennonites departed from the so-called Conservative Mennonite Conference itself as it voted in 1998 to not uphold the traditional Anabaptist practice of headcovering among women; they formed the Biblical Mennonite Alliance in 2000. Conservative Mennonites from other backgrounds also joined the Biblical Mennonite Alliance, which continues to encourage veiling.

The Mennonite Christian Fellowship emerged in the 20th century to conserve the traditional standards of plain dress, headcovering, and nonconformity to the world.

According to a University of Waterloo report, "of the estimated 59,000 Mennonites in Ontario, only about twenty percent are members of conservative groups".

The Pilgrim Mennonite Conference maintains a directory of Conservative Mennonite fellowships and congregations, which is known as the Pilgrim Ministry.

== Beliefs ==
These are sometimes referred to as Distinctives:

- Authority of the Scriptures
- Their view of Christ
- Distinctive view of the Christian
- High view of the Church including discipline
- The two kingdom concept
- Liberty of conscience
- Voluntary Church membership
- Belief in free will (closely associated with Arminianism in the Protestant tradition). (See also Free will in theology).
- Believer's baptism
- Discipleship
- Separation of Church and state
- Nonresistance
- Non swearing of oaths
- Separation and nonconformity to the world in many areas including clothing (See Modesty).
- Innocence of children
- Evangelistic zeal
- Victory in the Christian life is possible
- Closed communion
- Simplicity in lifestyle
- Simplicity of worship. This includes A cappella singing, segregated seating (in some churches) and kneeling prayer.
- Lay leadership and the plural ministry
- Christian woman's veiling: 1 Corinthians 11:1–16 still applies today. (See Christian headcovering).

Conservative Mennonites characteristically conduct worship services in the language of the country which they inhabit. This is in contrast to most Old Order groups which still conduct their services in German. They differ from the Old Order groups mainly in that Conservative Mennonites accept modern technologies (such as driving automobiles, having telephones, working on personal computers and using electricity), are evangelical, and conduct missions. The more conservative groupings also operate their own private Christian day schools (operated by free will offerings) in preference to promoting homeschooling. They teach abstinence from alcohol (teetotalism) and tobacco as well as temperance in all areas of life. They have a strong work ethic and frequently serve their communities and other areas in times of natural disaster through organized work programs, for instance Hurricane Katrina disaster relief. Conservative Mennonites along with Old Order Mennonites, and Amish hold to the basic tenets of Creation science including believing in a literal six-day creation.

Conservative Mennonites uphold the following confessions of faith: The Schleitheim Confession of Faith (1527), the Dordrecht Confession of Faith (1632), The Christian Fundamentals (1921) adopted at Garden City, Missouri (commonly called the Garden City Confession), and the Nationwide churches also use The Hartville Restatement of the Christian Fundamentals (1964).

== Ministry ==
Conservative Mennonites believe in a three-office ministry working together in what is called a plural ministry. They ordain deacons, ministers, and bishops from within their congregations by a process called the lot. Members of the ministry are not salaried, but most churches support their ministry team financially through free-will offerings.

== Colleges and universities ==
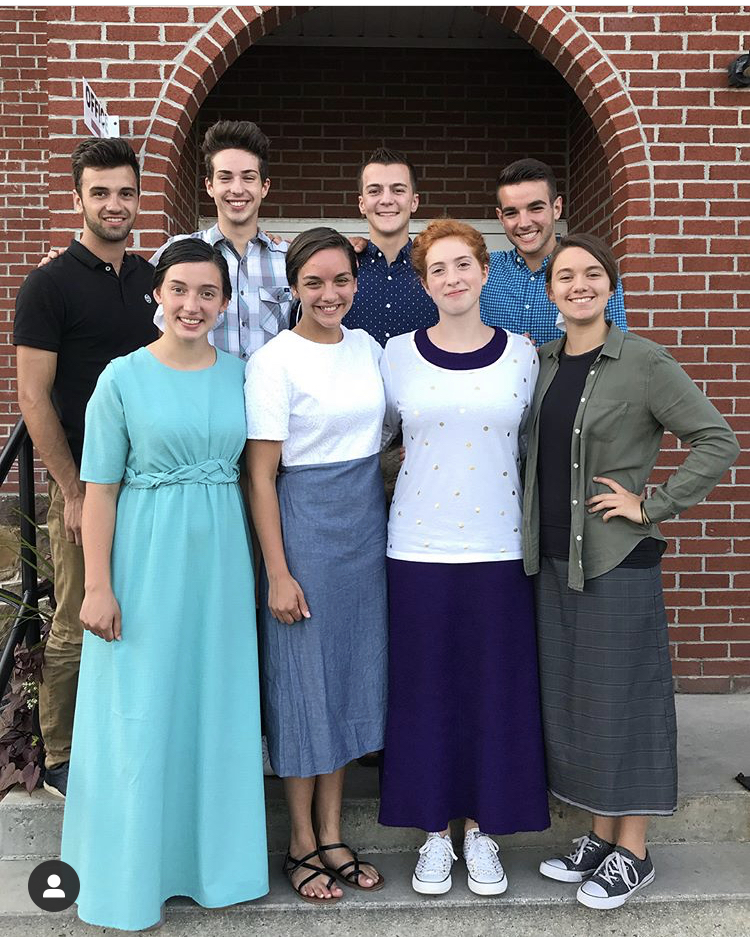
Conservative Mennonite students from Sharon Mennonite Bible Institute

- Elnora Bible Institute
- Pilgrim Bible School
- Sharon Mennonite Bible Institute

== Administration ==
The Washington County, Maryland and Franklin County, Pennsylvania Conference, Ohio Wisler Mennonites, Conservative Mennonite Churches of York and Adams Counties, Pennsylvania, the Pilgrim Mennonite Conference and the Eastern Pennsylvania Mennonite Church operate under a form of administration called a conference where each congregation has a common discipline (standard or constitution). The churches may be grouped in a district with one or two bishops sharing responsibility jointly or in part over a number of congregations within the district. This is a characteristic shared in common with most Old Order Mennonite groups. The Nationwide Fellowship churches are more congregational and whenever feasible a bishop will serve over one congregation but may assist with others and most congregations having their own unique discipline with elements in common. This congregational emphasis characteristic is shared in common with the Old Order Amish, Mennonite Christian Fellowship, Beachy Amish, and Tennessee Brotherhood churches.

== Conservative Mennonite denominations ==
A directory of Conservative Mennonite denominations and congregations is maintained by the Pilgrim Ministry, a work of the Pilgrim Mennonite Conference.

=== North America and South America ===
There are a number of congregations that have splintered or moved away from these beginning groups and have formed different fellowships.

The Reformed Mennonite Church is a Conservative Mennonite denomination that separated from the mainline body in 1812 under the direction of John Herr.

In 1956, the Conservative Mennonite Fellowship began to be associated informally together. Most of these congregations were of Amish Mennonite origin, coming from the so-called Conservative Mennonite Conference (now called the Rosedale Network of Churches), which started to abandon traditional Anabaptist distinctives such as the wearing of headcovering. The Conservative Mennonite Fellowship began the earliest mission work among the conservative groups in the early 1960s in Chimaltenago, Guatemala (on the Eastern side). What remained of these congregations joined the Nationwide Fellowship Churches in 1997.

Another group was the only conference to remain conservative, namely the Washington County, Maryland/Franklin County, Pennsylvania Conference (founded in 1790) centered mostly around Hagerstown, Maryland. Their history to 1960 has been published.

A third grouping peacefully requested to withdraw from the Lancaster Mennonite Conference (located centrally in Lancaster, Pennsylvania) in 1968 requesting to keep the 1954 discipline that was being revised. This group bears the name Eastern Pennsylvania Mennonite Church.

Another group geographically centered in York and Adams counties in Pennsylvania withdrew later from the Lancaster Conference in the early 1970s under the direction of their bishop Richard Danner. They are called the Conservative Mennonite Churches of York and Adams Counties, Pennsylvania.

Another group located in the Ohio counties of Wayne, Medina, Columbiana and Richland have their origin in the Wisler Conferences of Ohio and Michigan (an Old Order Mennonite grouping). In more recent years they have identified with the values of the Conservative Mennonites. They are called the Ohio Wisler Mennonites.

Over the years there have been various regroupings among these groups, with numerous independent congregations forming and reforming.

The some/many conservative groups do not have television or radio and shun or do not use the Internet. There are some websites nevertheless arising among those following this group; pilgrimministry.org is one such example. Finding external links or publications of this group online is rare because of their various stands.

Mission outreaches of these groups can be found in the Bahamas, Haiti, Dominican Republic, Ghana, Uganda, Nigeria, Ethiopia, Guatemala, Paraguay, Bolivia, Peru, Mexico, India, Philippines, and the beginnings of work in England, Tasmania, Australia, and Argentina/Bolivia.

Conservative Mennonites of the Beachy Amish Mennonite tradition include the Mennonite Christian Fellowship and Ambassadors Amish Mennonite Churches, as well as the more traditionally conservative Berea Amish Mennonite Fellowship and the Tennessee Brotherhood Churches. These Conservative Mennonite denominations believe in traditional Anabapist doctrines and practices, such as plain dress, headcovering, nonconformity to the world, footwashing, the holy kiss, communion, anointing with oil, the a cappella singing of hymns, as well as nonresistance; modern conveniences, such as automobiles and filtered internet, are widely used, though television is not watched as it is believed to be an occasion of sin.

The Church of God in Christ, Mennonite is a Conservative Mennonite denomination, though it is distinguished from others due to its stance of being the one true church.

=== England and Ireland ===
In Ireland, there is a Beachy Amish Mennonite Church in Dunmore East. They are not affiliated directly with Conservative Mennonites but share similar beliefs.

In England:

1. United Kingdom Mennonite Ministry, Shropshire Hills Mennonite Church, meet, on Sundays, in their own Church building near Craven Arms, Shropshire, (they no longer meet for monthly meetings at Old Sodbury near Bristol as they used to). The Americans here are under sponsorship of the (North Central) Nationwide Fellowship Mennonites from Wisconsin (USA). Members are operating Shepherd Hills Christian Bookstore 44, Shrewsbury Road, Craven Arms, SY7 9PY. They also sell high quality wood furniture in Shrewsbury and Craven Arms. Their annual Conference is attended by about 200 people and is held at Cefn Lea for weekend in early December.

=== Australia ===
In Australia, there are Nationwide Fellowship Mennonite congregations in Deloraine, Tasmania and also in Canowindra, New South Wales (Lachlan Valley Mennonite Church). The Tasmanian congregation sponsor annual weekend meetings in February of each year. There is also a plain Mennonite congregation in Queensland called the Australian Christian Brotherhood.

== Intermediate and Moderate Conservative Mennonite groupings ==
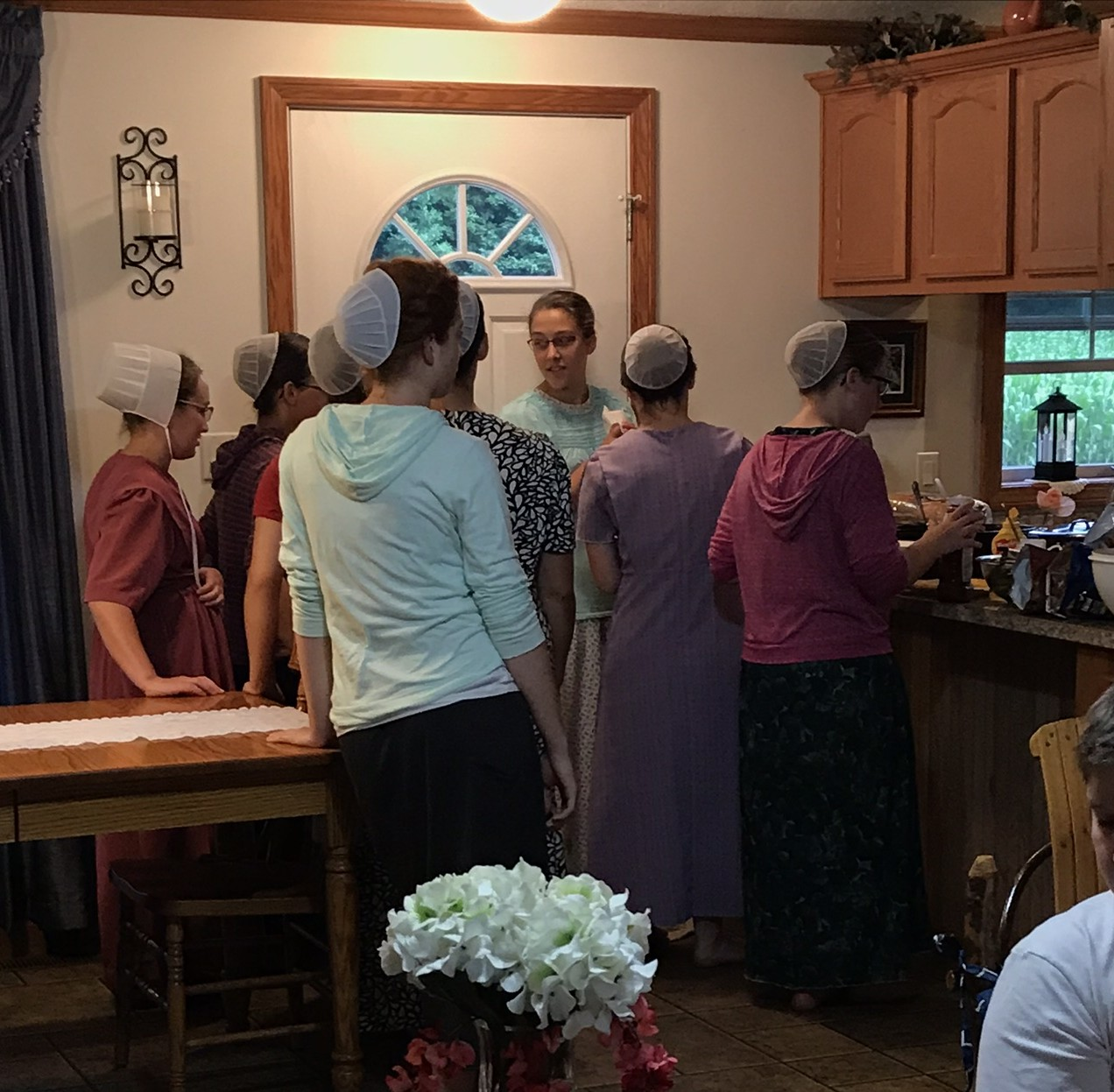
A group of Conservative Mennonite ladies belonging to the Midwest Mennonite Fellowship

These groups do not share the same level of strictness as the most conservative ones mentioned above but have similar origins or have withdrawn from the groupings above (like making the use of the radio optional or allowing more usage of the internet).

Southeastern Mennonite Conference officially began upon their withdrawal from Virginia Mennonite Conference in June 1972.

Others have formed from their withdrawal from the groups mentioned above. These include much smaller groups like (but not limited to): Bethel Fellowship, Mid Atlantic Fellowship, and Midwest Mennonite Fellowship, and numerous unaffiliated congregations.

After the so-called Conservative Mennonite Conference (now known as the Rosedale Network of Churches)—a mainline Mennonite denomination—did not uphold the practice of headcovering, several congregations departed the denomination and grouped together as the Biblical Mennonite Alliance in 2000. The Biblical Mennonite Alliance would be seen as being on the most progressive end of the Conservative Mennonite spectrum.

== Publishing ==
The most conservative groups operate the following publishing house: Rod and Staff Publishers in Crockett, Kentucky, offering both a full conservative Christian curriculum for home and traditional classroom settings as well as a complete bible study/Sunday school curriculum and periodicals. They also publish numerous reading materials for all ages. They publish mostly in English and Spanish with some German language publications. Rod and Staff was the first modern publisher of Christian school and homeschooling curricula beginning in 1962. Lamp and Light Publishers offers free Correspondence Courses in English, Spanish, French, and Portuguese. They are located in Farmington, New Mexico. Neither publisher has a website.

The Eastern Pennsylvania Mennonite Church operates its own publishing house offering curriculum for home and traditional classroom settings and other books and are located in Ephrata, Pennsylvania – Eastern Mennonite Publications. They offer Spanish publications and Bible Studies through their Spanish publishing house in Guatemala – Quetzaltenango Mennonite Publishers QMP. The Eastern Pennsylvania Mennonite Church publishes a monthly paper called The Eastern Mennonite Testimony.

The Washington/Franklin Conference has in recent years also begun publishing under the name Brotherhood Publications. They publish a quarterly publication called The Brotherhood Builder.

Christian Light Publications is a publishing house in Harrisonburg, Virginia, operated by a 9-member board and 15-member advisory board from many of the conservative conferences and fellowships: Southeastern, Mid-Atlantic, MidWest, Beachy, and others. They offer a full line of grade school, high school, Sunday school, and bible school curricula as well as periodicals, trade books, and more.

== See also ==
- Beachy Amish
- Dunkard Brethren Church
