= Eastern Pennsylvania Mennonite Church =

Church of Conservative Mennonites organized in 1969

The Eastern Pennsylvania Mennonite Church and Related Areas is a Church of Conservative Mennonites organized in 1969 as conservatives withdrew from the Lancaster Mennonite Conference. As of 1996 it was the largest Conservative Mennonite group.

== History ==
Eastern Pennsylvania Mennonite Church and Related Areas was formed in 1968 when a group of bishops, ministers, and deacons were granted a release from the Lancaster Mennonite Conference. The separation was by mutual agreement and by official sanction of the conference. The group peacefully requested to withdraw from the Lancaster Mennonite Conference in 1968, requesting to keep the 1954 discipline that was being revised.

== Faith ==
The group adheres to the Mennonite Confession of Faith (Christian Fundamentals, 1921, Garden City, Missouri) and to many of the practices which had been upheld by the Lancaster Mennonite Conference, including the conference-type of church organization and government (polity). The Eastern Pennsylvania Mennonite Church has a written statement of standards known as the Rules and Discipline, which is reviewed every three or four years and then ratified again by the congregations. The purpose for seeking release from the Lancaster Mennonite Conference was to develop a church program that would help preserve biblical practice and the historic Mennonite values. The Eastern Pennsylvania Mennonite Church does not accept divorce and remarriage.

== Customs ==
Women wear headcoverings and have uncut hair. Men, as a rule, do not enter the professions. They wear plain clothing, and their life is built around the church, schools, and religious activities. They do not engage in worldly amusements, nor do they follow organized sports. The use of radio and television is not allowed. Their life-style reflects the old Mennonite traditions.

Regular worship services include Sunday school and preaching every Sunday morning, Sunday evening services, and midweek prayer meetings. The singing is in four-part harmony without accompaniment, with some emphasis on singing instruction and special song services. No special group singing is allowed in worship services. Ministers are unsalaried and chosen from the congregation by nomination and the use of the lot.

Life insurance is not permitted and generally members do not use auto, health, fire, or other insurances, but rather employ a unique method of brotherhood assistance (mutual aid) that is directed by the deacons of the congregations.

Children of members do not attend public schools. Private schools are provided by the group so that all the member families have access to them. Teachers are not college-trained. Most of the students continue in school through 10th grade. Curriculum used in their schools is written, approved and published by the Mennonite Church members.

The church's monthly periodical, Eastern Mennonite Testimony, is published by the Publication Board.

The group sponsors 3-week winter Bible schools at Numidia, Pennsylvania, and Ashland, Pennsylvania. The schools are provided for young people in their late teens and early 20s, and offers a wide variety of Bible and practical studies. Each summer the Ashland school offers a two-week training course for school teachers, and in December a ministers' fellowship and seminar is provided.

Service opportunities are provided in relief work, literature evangelism, child care, and in elderly care. Additional opportunities are provided in connection with missions in Central and South America, Mexico, The Bahamas, Ghana and Togo.

== Members and congregations ==
In 1969, the Eastern Pennsylvania Mennonite Church and Related Areas had 27 congregations with 1,181 church members; in 1995 it had 59 churches with 3,434 members. In 2001 there were 4,206 members. In 2010, it had 77 congregations with 5,333 members. In 2020 it had 95 congregations, 6,656 members, 27 Bishops, 179 Ministers and 113 Deacons. In 2019, the Church also had 84 schools, 300 teachers and 2,679 pupils.

Many congregations are located in eastern Pennsylvania. Congregations are also located in New Jersey, New York, Maryland, Delaware, Florida, Georgia, Illinois, Missouri, Vermont, Texas, Ohio, Maine, Wisconsin, Indiana, Washington, Virginia, Michigan, Massachusetts, Manitoba, Alberta, and British Columbia.

The Mennonite Messianic Mission, Inc., directs the group's missions in Mexico, Guatemala, Argentina/Bolivia, the Bahamas, Paraguay, Ghana, and Togo.
