= Rosedale Network of Churches =

Christian body of conservative evangelical Anabaptist churches

- Classification: Anabaptist
- Theology: Evangelical
- Moderator: Ivan Yoder
- Executive Director: Brian Hershberger
- Conference Pastor: Darren Peachey
- Region: North America
- Headquarters: Irwin, Ohio
- Origin: 1910
- Congregations: 110
- Members: 13,000
- Tertiary institutions: Rosedale Bible College
- Official website: rosedalenetwork.org

The Rosedale Network of Churches is a Christian body of Mennonite churches in the Anabaptist tradition. Rosedale Network of Churches was originally formed in 1910 by a group of Amish Mennonites to promote unity while preserving autonomy of the local congregation.

== History ==
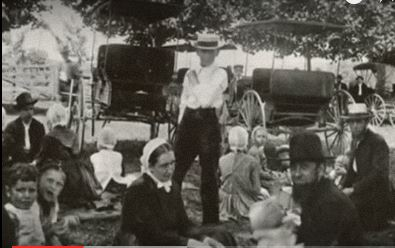
A photo taken at the first meeting of the Conservative Amish Mennonite Conference in Grantsville, Maryland, in 1910

For the early history see History of Anabaptist Christianity.

=== Amish beginnings ===
The first American settlement of the Amish Mennonites—who in 1693 separated from the main body of Swiss Brethren and followed Jacob Amman—was in Berks County, Pennsylvania, around 1710–1720. Soon they had settlements in Chester and Lancaster counties as well. By the middle of the 19th century, they had congregations from Pennsylvania to Iowa, as well as in Ontario, Canada.

=== The major division among the Amish ===
Before the division, all factions of the Amish were either called Amish or Amish Mennonites, with no difference in meaning. Mostly in the years between 1862 and 1878 a major division occurred among the Amish, that eventually led to two major factions: The Amish Mennonites and Old Order Amish.

Some of the more liberal minded Amish ministers organized conferences to serve their churches between 1862 and 1878. After the 1878 conference, they became known as the Amish Mennonites and their ministers formed three district conferences: Eastern, Indiana-Michigan, and Western.

Other congregations remained aloof from this conference movement and became forerunners of two groups—the Old Order Amish that formed mostly in the last third of the 19th century and the Conservative (Amish) Mennonite Conference that formed in 1910. Most of the churches of the liberal minded Amish Mennonite conference movement eventually merged with other Mennonite groups.

The Old Order Amish continued to worship in private homes (in the German language) and reject innovations in both worship and lifestyle. Some congregations were theologically in between the extremely conservative Old Order Amish and the more progressive conference Amish Mennonites. These churches did not join the Amish Mennonite conferences, but, unlike the Old Order Amish, were open to the use of meetinghouses, and the organization of missionary, publication, social service, and Sunday school work. Representatives of these congregations met in a conference in Pigeon, Michigan, on November 24–25, 1910, and adopted the name Conservative Amish Mennonite Conference. "Amish" was dropped and the Conservative Mennonite name taken when a revised constitution was adopted in 1957.

=== Later developments ===
Concern by some members and churches within the conference over liberalizing tendencies caused a number of congregations and individuals of the Rosedale Network of Churches (then known as the CMC) to splinter or move away from this group to join Conservative Mennonite denominations. The earliest group began to be associated informally together in what was called the Conservative Mennonite Fellowship beginning in 1956 with churches in Ontario, Ohio and elsewhere. In 1998, a group of leaders in the Conservative Mennonite Conference, disagreeing with a vote by the conference ministers that resulted in the wives of ministers no longer being required to wear the prayer veiling, left the conference and formed the Biblical Mennonite Alliance.

On February 23, 2023, CMC, formerly known as Conservative Mennonite Conference, changed its name to Rosedale Network of Churches, with the tagline “a global family of Anabaptists.”

== Faith and practice ==
The Rosedale Network of Churches subscribes to the "Mennonite Confession of Faith of 1963", and adopted the "Conservative Mennonite Statement of Theology" in 1991. The statement follows orthodox Trinitarian Christian patterns of belief with typical Mennonite emphasis. Baptism is a church ordinance, which may be performed by either pouring or immersion. Communion and feet washing are also observed. The statement also affirms the traditional Anabaptist position of nonresistance toward enemies: "Under God's provision, the state uses the sword, which 'is ordained of God outside the perfection of Christ' and is a function contrary to the New Testament teachings for the church and the disciple of Christ."

The sociologist Cory Anderson writes that despite its former name, the Rosedale Network of Churches (formerly the Conservative Mennonite Conference) is not categorized as a Conservative Mennonite denomination, but rather, is mainstream in orientation.

Women may engage in ministry, but leadership and ordination is restricted to men. Within congregations other roles of governance and/or teaching may be reserved for men. According to the Conservative Mennonite Statement of Practice, "As the head of the wife, man was created to provide loving and sacrificial leadership. The wife was created to respond with intelligent submission."

Two meetings are held annually, one in February for the ministers, and another in August for the general public. The executive board and the general secretary are elected at the ministers' meeting to oversee day-to-day operations.

== Status ==
The Rosedale Network of Churches is a North American body. In 2005 the conference had 11,199 members in 113 congregations in the United States. There was one congregation in Red Lake, Ontario, Canada. There are related bodies in other nations, such as the Costa Rica Mennonite Conference (org. 1974) and the Nicaragua Mennonite Conference (org. 1977).

The Brotherhood Beacon, the conference's official monthly periodical, began in 1971. Before this the conference published the Herold der Wahrheit, a semi-monthly publication, starting in 1912, and later the Missionary Bulletin, a quarterly, starting in 1952.

The Rosedale Network of Churches has a number of parachurch ministries. Rosedale Bible College is an accredited, two-year Bible college serving approximately 125 students annually. The college offers degrees in Biblical Studies with a number of additional concentration areas. Rosedale International, formerly Rosedale Mennonite Missions until 2019, is the mission agency of the conference, with roughly 120 workers in some 17 countries. The conference headquarters, Rosedale Bible College, are all located in Rosedale, Ohio, a rural crossroads about 30 miles west of Columbus, Ohio. The offices of Rosedale International were also located in Rosedale until 2015 when they were moved into Columbus proper.

The Rosedale Network of Churches maintains a loose relationship with the Mennonite Church USA (the largest Mennonite denomination), through representation on some of its major boards.
