= Old Beachy Amish =

Amish sect

The Old Beachy Amish or Old Beachy Amish Mennonites, also called Midwest Beachy Amish Mennonites, are a Plain, car-driving Beachy Amish group, that preserves the old ways of the Beachy Amish, including the German language. They live in Kentucky and Illinois. They are part of the Amish Mennonite movement in a broader sense, but they are not an organized denomination.

== History ==
In 1927 the Beachy church emerged from a division in the (Casselman) River Old Order Amish congregation in Somerset County, Pennsylvania. Bishop Moses M. Beachy led the new congregation during that time, and his name became associated with this faction. The Beachys favored a milder discipline for members whose only offense was transferring membership to other Anabaptist churches, specifically the conservative Amish Mennonite congregation that broke away from Moses Beachy's congregation in 1895.

Between 1946 and 1977, the majority of the Beachy Amish embraced elements of revivalistic theology. The Old Beachy Amish who wanted to preserve the old ways of Beachy Amish resisted this change and subsequently formed new congregations in the late 1960s by withdrawal from existing Beachy Amish congregation. From around 1970 until the early 1990s, the center of the Old Beachy Amish was in Paris, Tennessee.

Mostly in the years 1991 and 1992, there was a massive exodus from the congregation in Paris, because of internal tensions concerning the use of English. By 2000, the Old Beachys had completely left the Paris region.

== Belief and practice ==
As descendants from the Old Order Amish, the Old Beachy Amish are an Anabaptist Christian group in the tradition of the Radical Reformation of the early 16th century. In contrast to other Beachy Amish they have retained the Pennsylvania German language, which they also use for church service and which is an important factor of their distinctive identity.

They have dress standards as strict as or stricter than many Old Order Amish. They use cars, electricity, and telephone but require the cars to be black and do not allow microwaves and answering machines. The use of tape and CD players and computers is tightly restricted. According to Donald Kraybill the Old Beachy Amish are similar in lifestyle to the Old Order Amish.

== Members and congregations ==
Old Beachy Amish in 2010
County	State	Adherents
Adams County	Illinois	171
Casey County	Kentucky	135
Graves County	Kentucky	109
Richland County	Illinois	123
Saline County	Illinois	97
Webster County	Kentucky	112

In 2010 there were 747 adherents in six locations: Casey County, Kentucky, with 135 adherents, Webster County, Kentucky with 112 adherents, Graves County, Kentucky, with 109 adherents, Adams County, Illinois, with 171 adherents, Richland County, Illinois with 123 adherents, and Saline County, Illinois with 97 adherents. According to Donald Kraybill the Old Beachy Amish had about 400 baptized members in 2010. According to the Mennonite World Conference, there were eight Old Beachy Amish congregations with 790 baptized members in 2018.

== See also ==
- Subgroups of Amish
