= Biblical Mennonite Alliance =

Biblical Mennonite Alliance (BMA) is an organization of Conservative Mennonite Anabaptist congregations located primarily in the eastern two thirds of the US and Canada, with some international affiliates. The BMA congregations are organized into groups called Regionals that are under the oversight of ordained ministers called Overseers.

== Overview ==
The group resulted from a split with the Conservative Mennonite Conference (now known as the Rosedale Network of Churches). In a 1998 meeting, CMC took a vote that failed to uphold the required practice of the woman's veiling. This was the final straw in a series of issues that increasingly alienated several conservative congregations within the conference. These churches broke from CMC and, along with a few other non-CMC churches, formed BMA.

In the 2005 BMA Directory, the membership was calculated to be at 1,669. Several congregations have joined since then. In the 2010 BMA Directory there were 47 BMA congregations in the US as well as two in Canada and one in Jamaica. The membership was calculated at 2,718. BMA operates its own missions board and has missionaries in several countries.

As of December 2019, there were 72 BMA churches holding services, and there were 10 church plants in various locations.

BMA also owns and oversees Elnora Bible Institute (EBI) in Elnora, Indiana. EBI currently offers four terms, one fifteen-week, one three-week, and two six-week terms every school year. EBI offers courses meant to stimulate spiritual growth as well as practical expressions of faith in students' lives.

== See also ==
- Amish Mennonite
- Anabaptism
- Christianity
- Conservative Mennonites
- Mennonites
- Ministry of Jesus
