= Mennonite Christian Fellowship =

The Mennonite Christian Fellowship churches, or just Fellowship churches, are an Amish Mennonite constituency within the conservative Anabaptist faith and tradition. The group is theologically and historically similar to the Beachy Amish Mennonite constituency. They are somewhat closer in thought to the Conservative Mennonites in matters of doctrine and conservatism.

The constituency originated from several congregations separating from the Old Order Amish in the 1950s and 1960s. The congregations resembled the more conservative end of the Beachy Amish Mennonite constituency at that time. The two groups shared fellowship to the extent that these churches were incorporated into the Beachy affiliation. In 1977, however, some of the ordained men in these churches expressed concern about perceived worldly trends among the Beachys. They met with other ordained Beachy men, to address concerns that included members baptized without a true Christian conversion, worldly fads in clothing and lifestyle, and churches conglomerating in communities instead of spreading out. After this meeting, the concerned men decided to withdraw from the Beachys and organize the Mennonite Christian Fellowship. In 1978, these churches started holding their own annual Minister's Meetings.

In 2006, the Fellowship churches had 1,518 members in 34 congregations, located mostly in the United States. In 2010, membership in the US rose to 2,629 members in 24 churches.

The Mennonite Christian Fellowship publishes a monthly newsletter entitled The Fellowship Contributor. There are mission outreaches in Honduras and Nicaragua.
