= Stuckey Amish =

The Stuckey Amish or Stuckey Amish Mennonites were a subgroup of the Amish that emerged from a division in 1872 under the leadership of Joseph Stuckey (1825–1902) and that merged with the Mennonite mainstream in the middle of the 20th century. In the second half of the 19th century, the Stuckey Amish were the most liberal faction of all Amish groups.

== History ==
In 1864, Joseph Stuckey was ordained bishop of the North Danvers Church in Danvers, Illinois, an Amish church organized in 1835. In 1872, the Amish conference (Dienerversammlung) requested that Stuckey excommunicate Joseph Joder, who was a member of the congregation and who taught Universalism, but Stuckey refused what led to a division and the formation of the Stuckey Amish. Stuckey also allowed excommunicated members of other communities to join, was more relaxed in dress standards, advocated integration with the outside society and espoused Universalism and the belief that God would save all of humanity regardless of religious affiliation.

In the beginning only two small congregations at Meadows and Washington, Illinois, which were under Stuckey's oversight, joined him, but soon his following grew through new congregations that were organized in other places and one at Topeka, Indiana (1902), which left the old church there and joined Stuckey's group.

In 1899 the Stuckey Amish were organized as a conference. In 1945 they joined the General Conference Mennonite Church as a district conference. In 1957 they merged with the Middle District Conference to form the Central District of the General Conference Mennonite Church.

== Literature ==
- Steven M. Nolt: A History of the Amish, Intercourse: Good Books, 2016. ISBN 9781680990652
