= Krummbach (Steinhauser Rottum) =

River in Baden-Württemberg, Germany

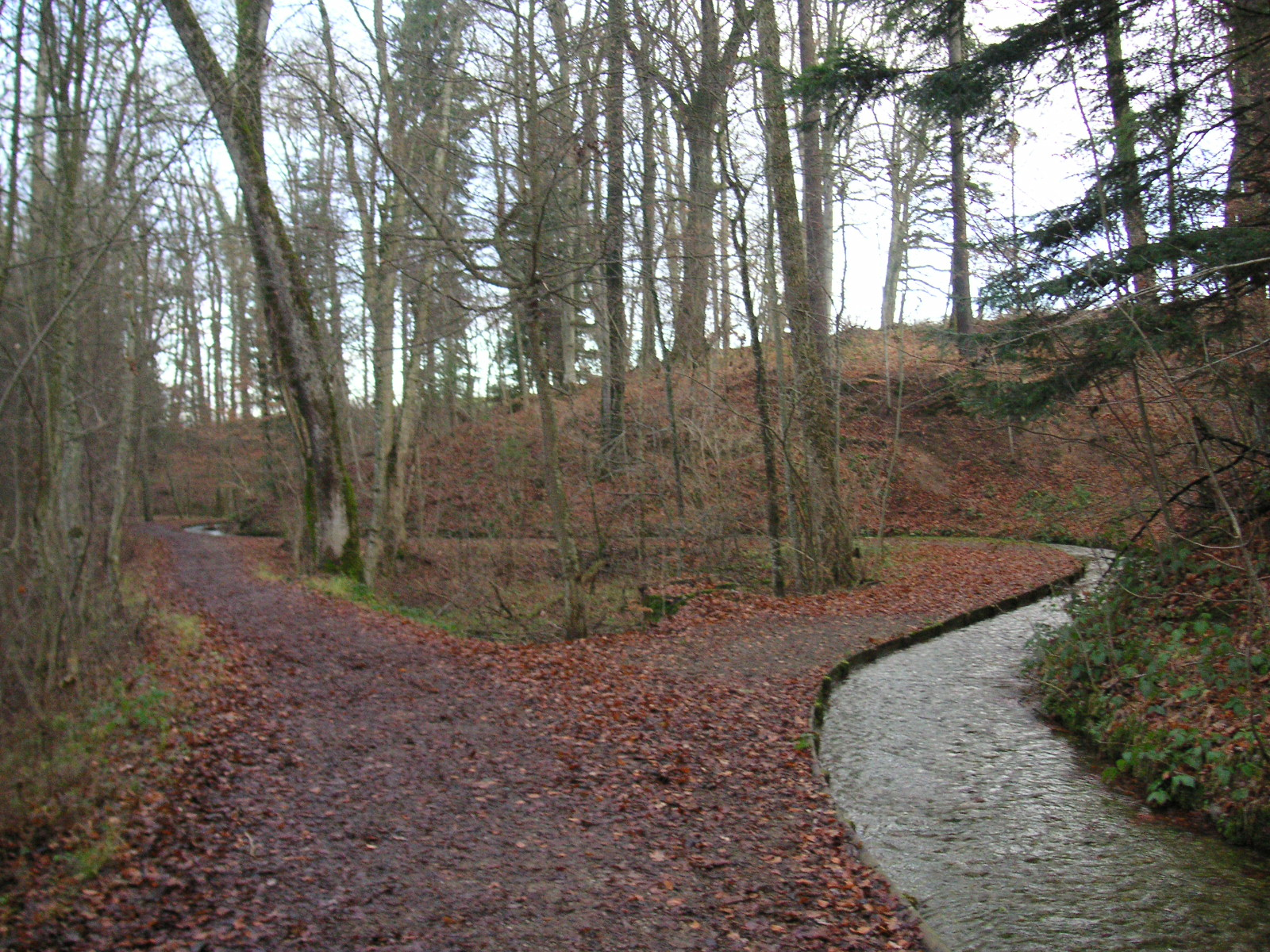

Location
- Country: Germany
- State: Baden-Württemberg

Physical characteristics
- Mouth
  - location: Steinhauser Rottum
  - coordinates: 48.0658°N 9.9556°E

Basin features
- Progression: Steinhauser Rottum→ Rottum→ Westernach→ Danube→ Black Sea

Krummbach is a small artificial river in Ochsenhausen, Baden-Württemberg, Germany.

It was created by monks of the Ochsenhausen Abbey in the 15th century. It is a tributary of the Steinhauser Rottum.

== See also ==
- List of rivers of Baden-Württemberg
