= Saubach (disambiguation) =

Saubach is a village and a former municipality in the Burgenlandkreis district, in Saxony-Anhalt, Germany.

Saubach may also refer to:

- Saubach (Inde), a river of North Rhine-Westphalia, Germany, tributary of the Inde
- Saubach (Dürnach), a river of Baden-Württemberg, Germany, tributary of the Dürnach
- Saubach (Stadtseebach), a river of Baden-Württemberg, Germany, tributary of the Sulm
