= Kaltenbach (Dürnach) =

River in Germany

Location
- Country: Germany
- States: Baden-Württemberg

Physical characteristics
- Source
  - location: near Ringschnait
  - elevation: 630 m (2,070 ft)
- Mouth
  - location: Dürnach
  - coordinates: 48.1089°N 9.9022°E
- Length: 5.4 km (3.4 mi)

Basin features
- Progression: Dürnach→ Westernach→ Danube→ Black Sea

Kaltenbach is a river of Baden-Württemberg, Germany. It is a right tributary of the Dürnach and belongs to the Danube river system. It is 5 kilometers (3.1 mi) long and rises about 1 kilometer (0.62 mi) east of Ringschnait. Most of the river flows through forest, and then flows into the Dürnach south-west of Wennedach.

== See also ==
- List of rivers of Baden-Württemberg
