= Kaltenbach =

Kaltenbach may refer to the following:

Places:

- Kaltenbach, Switzerland, a part of the municipality of Wagenhausen, Thurgau, Switzerland
- Kaltenbach, Austria, a municipality in Zillertal, Tyrol, Austria
- Nové Hutě (Kaltenbach), a municipality in Prachatice District, Czech Republic

Rivers:

- Kaltenbach (Dürnach), a river in Baden-Württemberg, Germany, tributary of the Dürnach
- Kaltenbach (White Elster), a river in Saxony, Germany, tributary of the White Elster
- Kaltenbach (Wupper), a river in North Rhine-Westphalia, Germany, tributary of the Wupper
- Kaltenbach (Elsava), a river of Bavaria, Germany, further downstream called Elsava
- Kaltenbach (Mangfall), a river of Bavaria, Germany, tributary of the Mangfall

People:

- Ernst Kaltenbach (1889–1995), Swiss footballer who played as a midfielder
- Frederick Wilhelm Kaltenbach (1895–1945), American of German origin who broadcast Nazi propaganda from Germany during World War II
- Johann Heinrich Kaltenbach (1807–1876), German naturalist and entomologist
- Luther Kaltenbach (1843–1922), veteran of the American Civil War and a recipient of the Medal of Honor
- Rudolf Kaltenbach (1842–1893), German gynaecologist
