= Bellamonter Rottum =

River in Germany

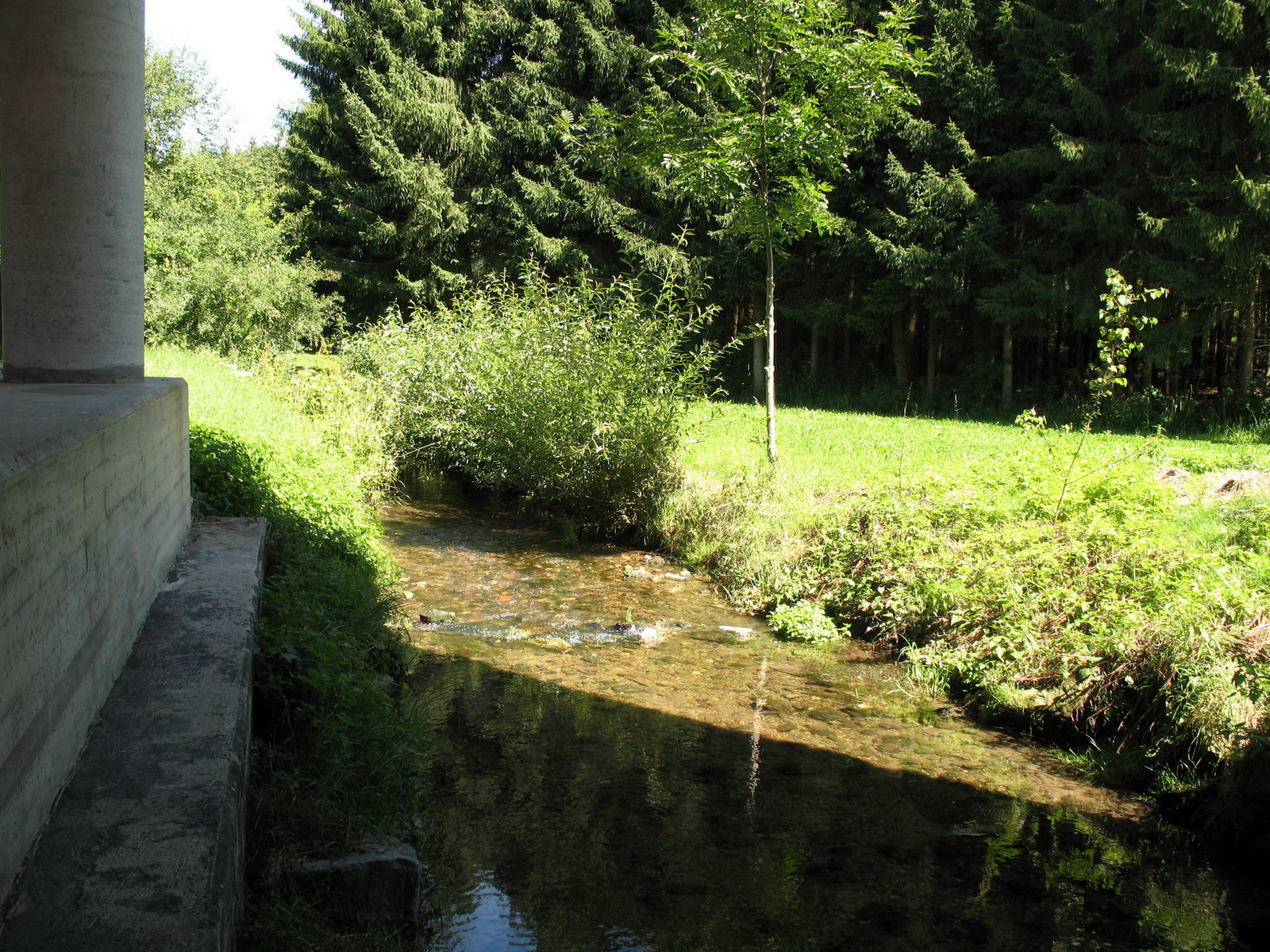
- The Bellamonter Rottum shortly after Rottum (a part of Steinhausen an der Rottum), under the bridge of the Kreisstraße 7570

Location
- Country: Germany
- State: Baden-Württemberg

Physical characteristics
- Mouth
  - location: Rottum
  - coordinates: 48.0710°N 9.9522°E

Basin features
- Progression: Rottum→ Westernach→ Danube→ Black Sea

The Bellamonter Rottum is a river in Baden-Württemberg, Germany. At its confluence with the Steinhauser Rottum in Ochsenhausen, the Rottum is formed.

== See also ==
- List of rivers of Baden-Württemberg
