= Rottum (river) =

River in Germany

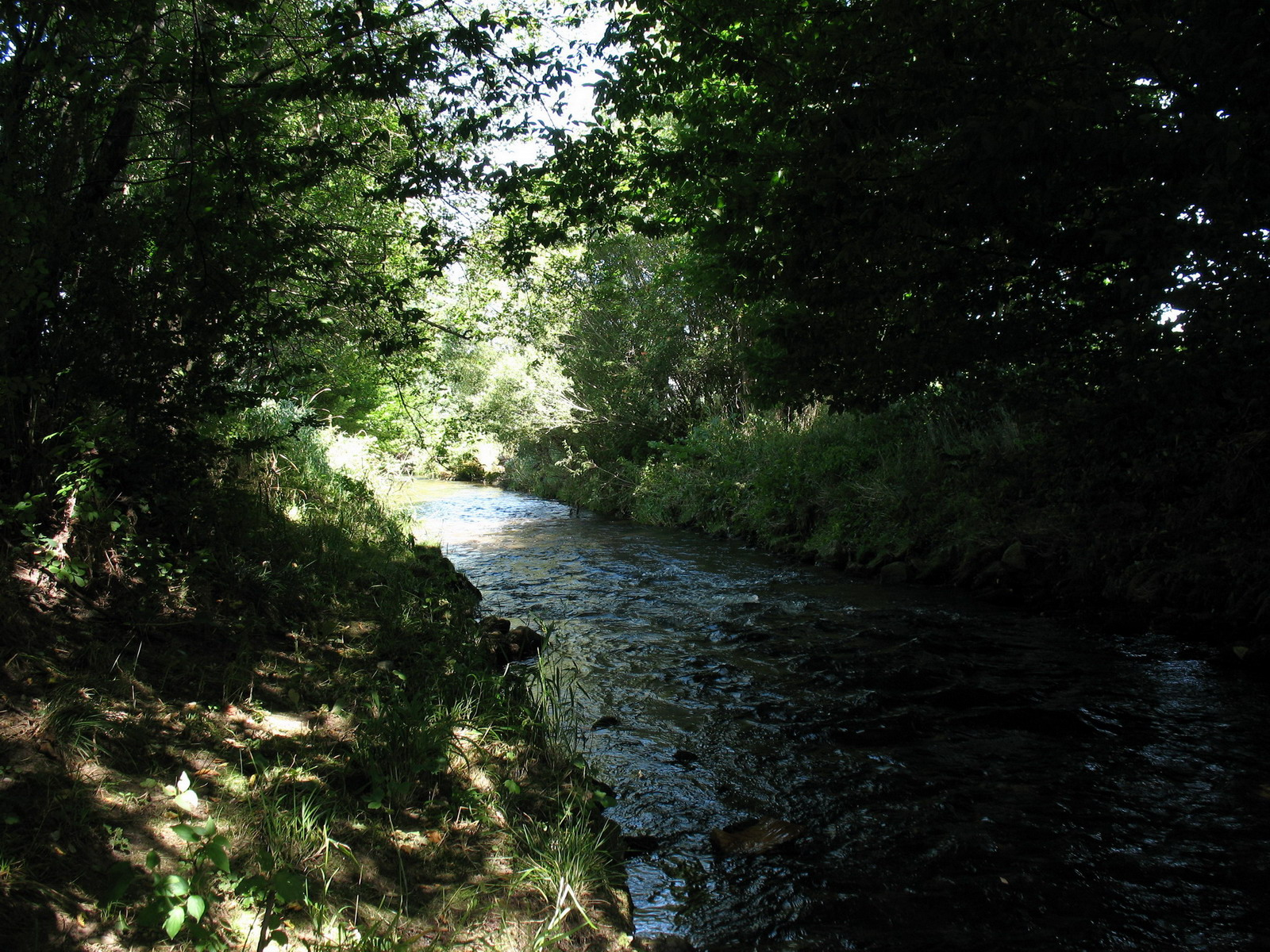

Location
- Country: Germany
- State: Baden-Württemberg

Physical characteristics
- Source
  - location: Ochsenhausen
  - elevation: 577 m (1,893 ft)
- Mouth
  - location: Westernach
  - coordinates: 48.2591°N 9.8708°E
  - elevation: 490 m (1,610 ft)
- Length: 24 km (15 mi)

Basin features
- Progression: Westernach→ Danube→ Black Sea

The Rottum is a river in the region of Upper Swabia in Baden-Württemberg in Germany. It is a tributary of the river Westernach, itself a tributary of the Danube, and has a length of 24 km. Including its source river Bellamonter Rottum and its lower course Westernach, it is 43.8 km (27.2 mi) long.

The Rottum runs from south to north parallel to the river Rot to the east.

== Geography ==
The Rottum is formed at the confluence of the Bellamonter Rottum and the Steinhauser Rottum (also known as Lower Rottum) within the borders of the city of Ochsenhausen from where it flows in a northerly direction towards the river Danube passing Goppertshofen. It then flows through Reinstetten and Schönebürg towards Mietingen. Between Schönebürg and Mietingen an unnamed tributary empties its waters into the Rottum. This tributary is supplied from ponds belonging to former Heggbach Abbey. Having passed through Mietingen the Rottum then runs through Baustetten and Laupheim before joining the river Dürnach three kilometres to the north of Laupheim to form the river Westernach.

== Tourism ==
Parts of the Upper Swabian Baroque Route run along the river Rottum.

== Renaturation ==
In its original state, the river Rottum had been meandering through the valley for most of its course. However, in the 1820s works to channel the river started, the last of which were finished in 1970, giving the river its current appearance.

In 2013, a project will start to renaturate a stretch of the river within the confines of the city of Laupheim.

== See also ==
- Upper Swabia
- List of rivers of Baden-Württemberg
