= Kaltenbacher =

Kaltenbacher is a surname referring to one of several places named Kaltenbach. Notable people with this name include:

- Barbara Kaltenbacher, Austrian mathematician
- Bastien Kaltenbacher (better known as Bastian Baker, born 1991), Swiss singer/songwriter, brother of Marine
- Joseph Kaltenbacher, founder of American leather product supplier Seton Company, Inc.
- Marine Kaltenbacher, songwriter of Sister (S!sters song), sister of Bastien
- Paul Kaltenbacher, one of the initial two people accused in the Zaubererjackl witch trials in 17th-century Salzburg
- Philip D. Kaltenbacher (born 1937), American politician
