= Andreas Weller =

German tenor (born 1969)

- Born: 1969 (age 55–56); Stuttgart, West Germany
- Education: Stuttgarter Hymnus-Chorknaben; Musikhochschule Stuttgart
- Occupation: Classical tenor

Andreas Weller (born 1969) is a German tenor who focuses on historically informed performance.

== Career ==
Born in Stuttgart, Weller was from the age of eight a singer in the boys' choir Stuttgarter Hymnus-Chorknaben. He studied voice and conducting with Bruce Abel at the Hochschule für Musik und Darstellende Kunst Stuttgart.

Weller has collaborated with conductors of historically informed performances such as Frieder Bernius, Marcus Creed, Daniel Harding, Thomas Hengelbrock, Philippe Herreweghe, Hartmut Höll, Konrad Junghänel, Ton Koopman, Sigiswald Kuijken, Jun Märkl, Helmuth Rilling, Masaaki Suzuki and Roger Vignoles. He has worked with the ensembles The King's Singers and Les Arts Florissants. He appeared at international festivals such as the Soundstreams Festival in Toronto and the Festival van Vlaanderen.

== Recording ==
- Bach: Siehe, ich will viel Fischer aussenden, BWV 88
