= Steinhauser Rottum =

River in Germany

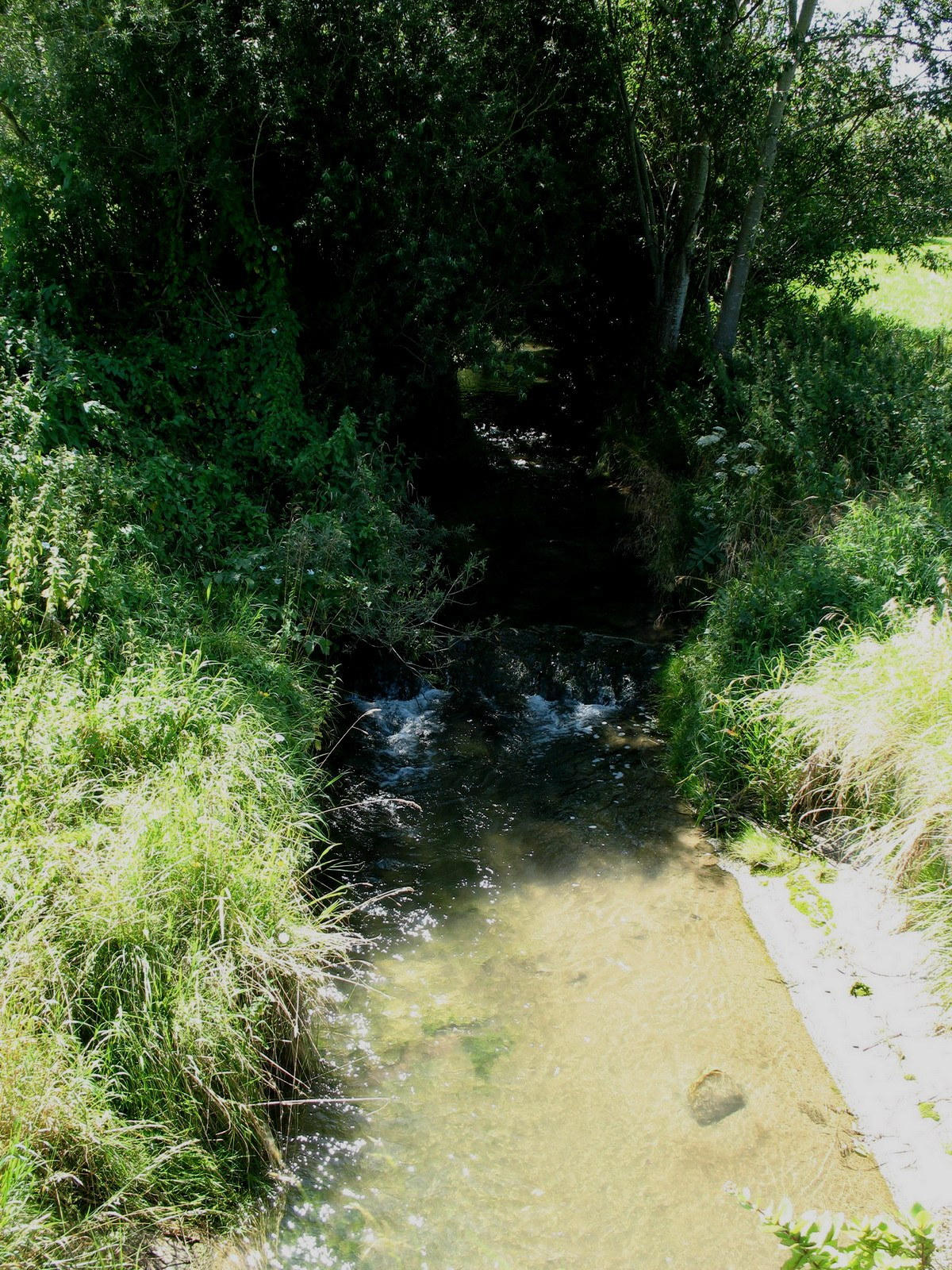

Location
- Country: Germany
- State: Baden-Württemberg

Physical characteristics
- Mouth
  - location: Rottum
  - coordinates: 48.0710°N 9.9522°E

Basin features
- Progression: Rottum→ Westernach→ Danube→ Black Sea

Steinhauser Rottum (also known as: Untere Rottum) is a river in Baden-Württemberg, Germany. At its confluence with the Bellamonter Rottum in Ochsenhausen, the Rottum is formed.

== See also ==
- List of rivers of Baden-Württemberg
