= Briegel =

Briegel is a surname of German origin. It may refer to:

- Eva Briegel (born 1978), German singer and member of the rock band Juli
- Hans J. Briegel (born 1962), German theoretical physicist
- Hans-Peter Briegel (born 1955), German footballer and manager
- Wolfgang Carl Briegel (1626–1712), German organist, teacher, and composer
