= Maria Friesenhausen =

German classical soprano singer (1932–2020)

- Maria Friesenhausen, in the 1970s
- Born: 23 March 1932; Altendorf (Ruhr)
- Died: 31 July 2020 (aged 88); Essen, Germany
- Other names: Maria Friesenhausen-Balkenhol
- Education: Folkwangschule
- Occupations: Classical soprano; Academic teacher
- Organizations: University of Dortmund

Maria Friesenhausen (23 March 1932 – 31 July 2020) was a German classical soprano who appeared in Europe. She is known for recordings of Baroque music on record and with broadcasters. She was also a professor of voice at the University of Dortmund.

== Career ==
Friesenhausen was born the daughter of a church musician in Altendorf, now Burgaltendorf, a part of Essen. She studied at the Folkwangschule in Essen, with Hilde Wesselmann, among others. She finished with a degree in both voice teaching and operatic singing in 1957. She focused on concert singing and recording, especially of works by Johann Sebastian Bach and other Baroque composers. She toured in Europe, for example to Geneva, Helsinki, Paris and Vienna.

She was the soprano soloist in several Bach cantatas in the series of the broadcaster NDR conducted by Max Thurn with the NDR Chor, such as in 1960 Jesu, der du meine Seele, BWV 78, alongside Ursula Zollenkopf, Johannes Feyerabend and Erich Wenk. She recorded Dieterich Buxtehude's Lauda Sion Salvatorem, BuxWV 68, with Helmut Kahlhöfer. She was the soloist in a recording of Bach's Christmas Oratorio conducted by Hans Grischkat, alongside Hildegard Laurich, Peter Wetzler and Bruce Abel in 1972.

In Baroque opera, she recorded in 1973 the part of an elegant lady in Lully's Le Bourgeois gentilhomme, with Siegmund Nimsgern in the title role; Gustav Leonhardt conducted La Petite Bande and members of the Tölzer Knabenchor. She also recorded Andreas Romberg's Das Lied von der Glocke. She performed in church concerts, such as in 1977 in Haydn's Die Schöpfung at St. Patrokli in Soest.

Friesenhausen worked as a professor of voice at the University of Dortmund. In 2001 she trained the soloists, including Georg Poplutz and Karin Lindemann in the title roles, for a performance of Handel's Acis und Galatea with the university choir, in a set with costumes designed by students.

Friesenhausen died in Essen on 31 July 2020. In 2024, her son organised a Requiem charity concert in her memory in her favourite church in Essen.
