= Karl Norbert Schmid =

German organist, composer and music educator

Karl Norbert Schmid (16 December 1926 – 13 February 1995) was a German organist, composer, choir director and music educator.

== Life and career ==
Schmid was born in Ochsenhausen. Already at the age of ten, he substituted for his teacher, the organist at the Gabler organ at St. Georg in Ochsenhausen. This influenced his career decision: After the Abitur, he studied Catholic church music at the Kirchenmusikschule (today Hochschule für Katholische Kirchenmusik und Musikpädagogik Regensburg) in Regensburg from 1943 to 1948, making him one of the first graduates after World War II. He then studied until 1952 at the Musikhochschule Stuttgart with Anton Nowakowski (organ), Karl Marx (composition), Hermann Keller (music theory), Gustav Koslik (orchestra conducting) and Hans Grischkat (choral conducting).

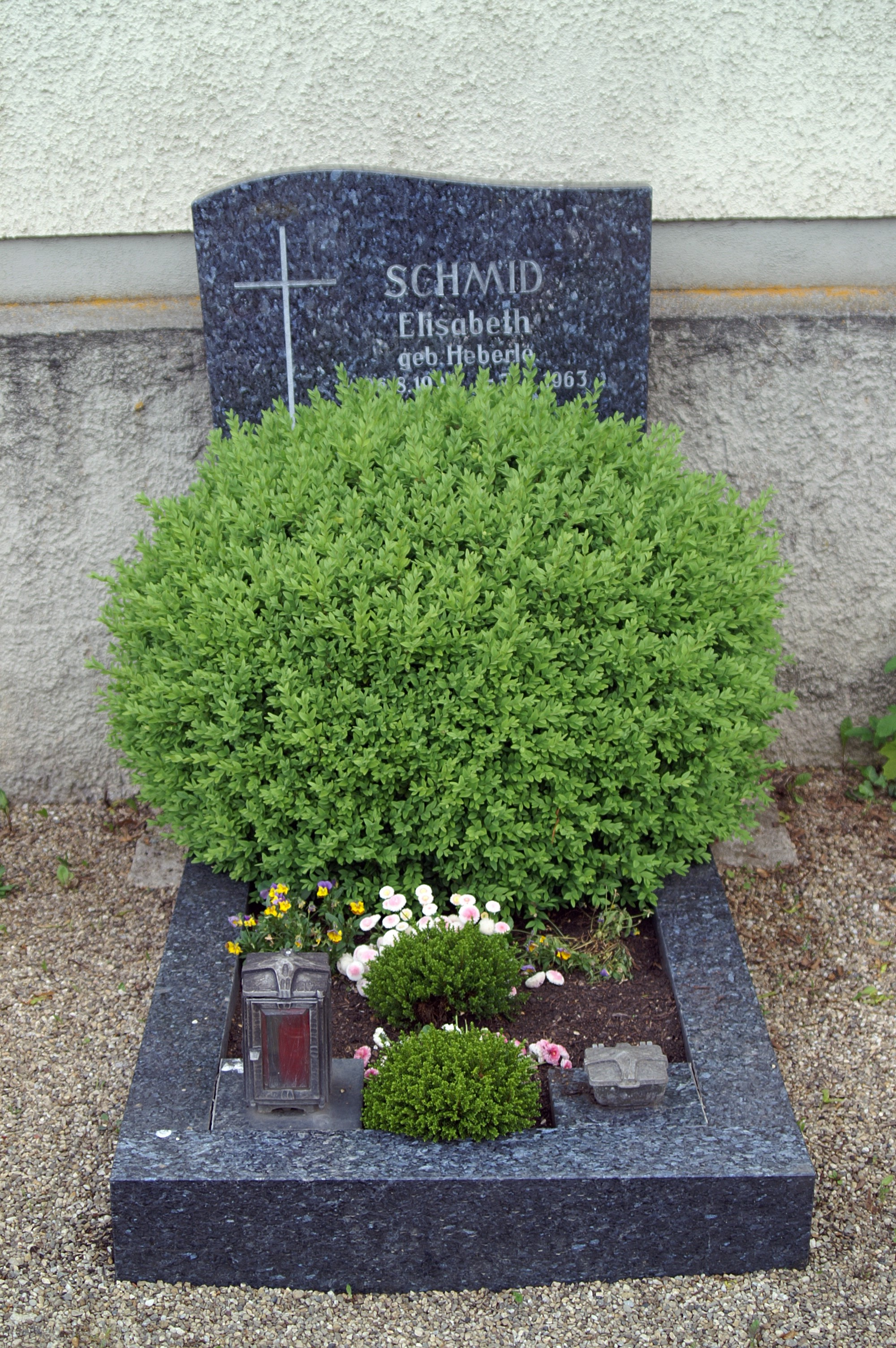
Karl Norbert Schmid's grave

From 1952 to 1954 he was choirmaster at the Münster in Schwäbisch Gmünd. In 1954, Ferdinand Haberl brought him to the Regensburg Kirchenmusikschule as lecturer for organ playing and choir direction, and also entrusted him with the direction of the school's choir. He formed a choir with a specific sound, which became the school's flagship (Aushängeschild). It became known through concert tours, radio and recordings. In 1985, Schmid had to give it up for health reasons, but he continued to work as a lecturer. He worked in Regensburg as composer and teacher for more than thirty years. Among his students was Roland Büchner, who later became one of his successors and Domkapellmeister in Regensburg.

In 1972, Schmid was awarded the Silver Pontifical Medal from Pope Paul VI in Rome for the achievements of the Kirchenmusischulchor. In 1975, he was awarded the culture prize of Eastern Bavaria, and in 1977 he was appointed Episcopal Kirchenmusikdirektor. He became a member of the church music commission of the Diocese of Regensburg in 1984. He was an Orgelsachverständiger (organ expert), designed the disposition of several instrument, and advised restorations of organs, finding pragmatic solutions. He was the holder of the Orlando di Lasso Medal of the Allgemeiner Cäcilien-Verband für Deutschland.

Schmid was married twice, to Elisabeth née Hebele, and later to Hildegard née Hauser. Both wives died of illness, and had no children. Schmid died after a short illness at the age of 68 and was buried on 16 February 1995 in a family grave at the Lower Catholic Cemetery in Regensburg.

== Work ==
After the Second Vatican Council, the vernacular language was also used in the liturgy instead of the historic Latin. Schmid filled the shortage in suitable church music in German by composing settings of hymns from the Gotteslob, often with Überchor (a choir in higher range than congregational singing), chorale cantatas, psalms settings, masses and proprium hymns. His works are accessible to lay performers. They became widely used throughout German-speaking countries.

Schmid dedicated his Te Deum for soloists, choir and orchestra, Op. 100, to Bishop Manfred Müller. He is known for his setting with Überchor of "Großer Gott, wir loben dich", which is often performed at the end of festive masses, sometimes augmented with brass or orchestra. It ended an open-air Papal mass in Regensburg when Pope Benedict XVI visited Bavaria in 2006, leading to more popularity.

Schmid's compositional estate is held by Proskesche Musikabteilung der Bischöflichen Zentralbibliothek (Proske's music department of the episcopal central library) in Regensburg.
