= Saubach (Dürnach) =

River in Baden-Württemberg, Germany

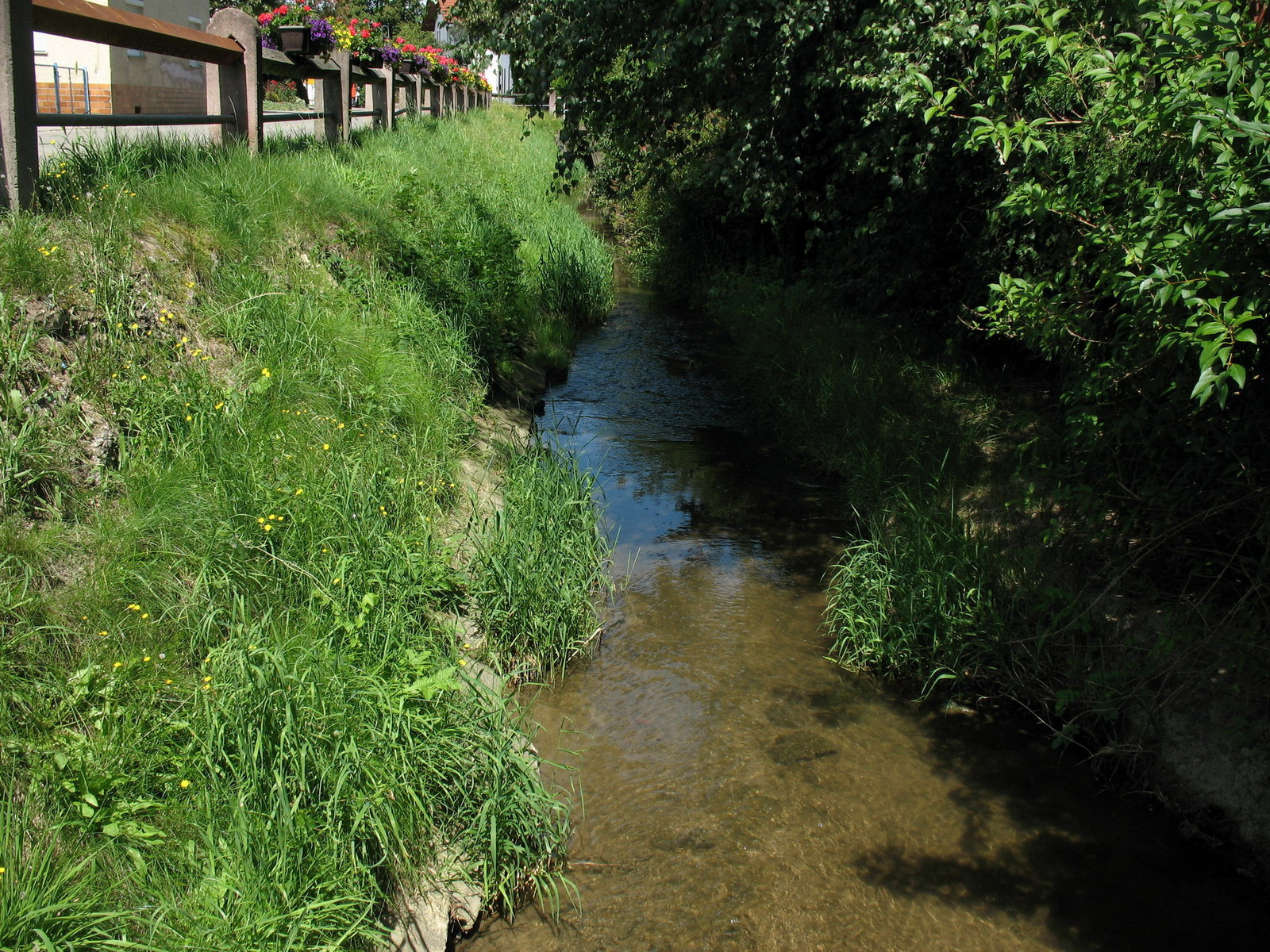

Location
- Country: Germany
- State: Baden-Württemberg

Physical characteristics
- Source
  - elevation: 100 m (330 ft)
- Mouth
  - location: Dürnach
  - coordinates: 48.2058°N 9.8589°E
- Length: 13.9 km (8.6 mi)

Basin features
- Progression: Dürnach→ Westernach→ Danube→ Black Sea

Saubach is a river of Baden-Württemberg, Germany. It is a left tributary of the Dürnach near Laupheim.

== See also ==
- List of rivers of Baden-Württemberg
