= Baltringen =

Coordinates: 48°10′N 9°52′E

Location of Baltringen in Germany
Location of Baltringen inBaden-Württemberg

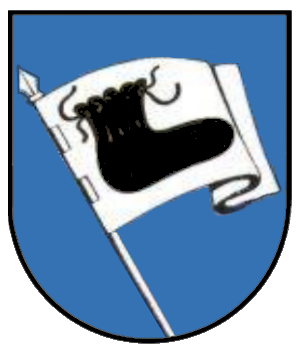
Coat of arms of Baltringen showing the Bundschuh symbolizing the rising and advance of the peasant (Bundschuh movement)

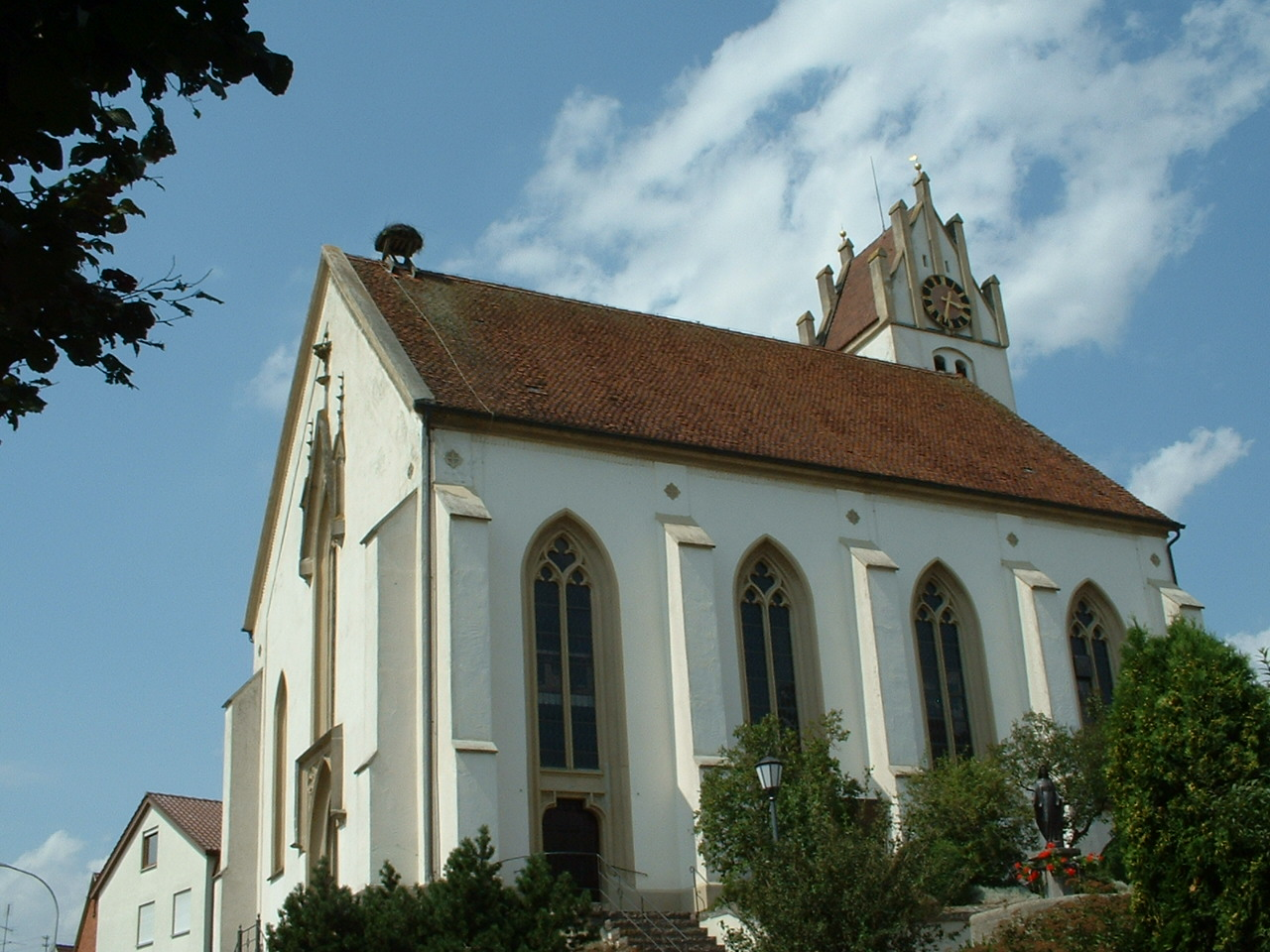
Baltringen, parish church St Nicholas

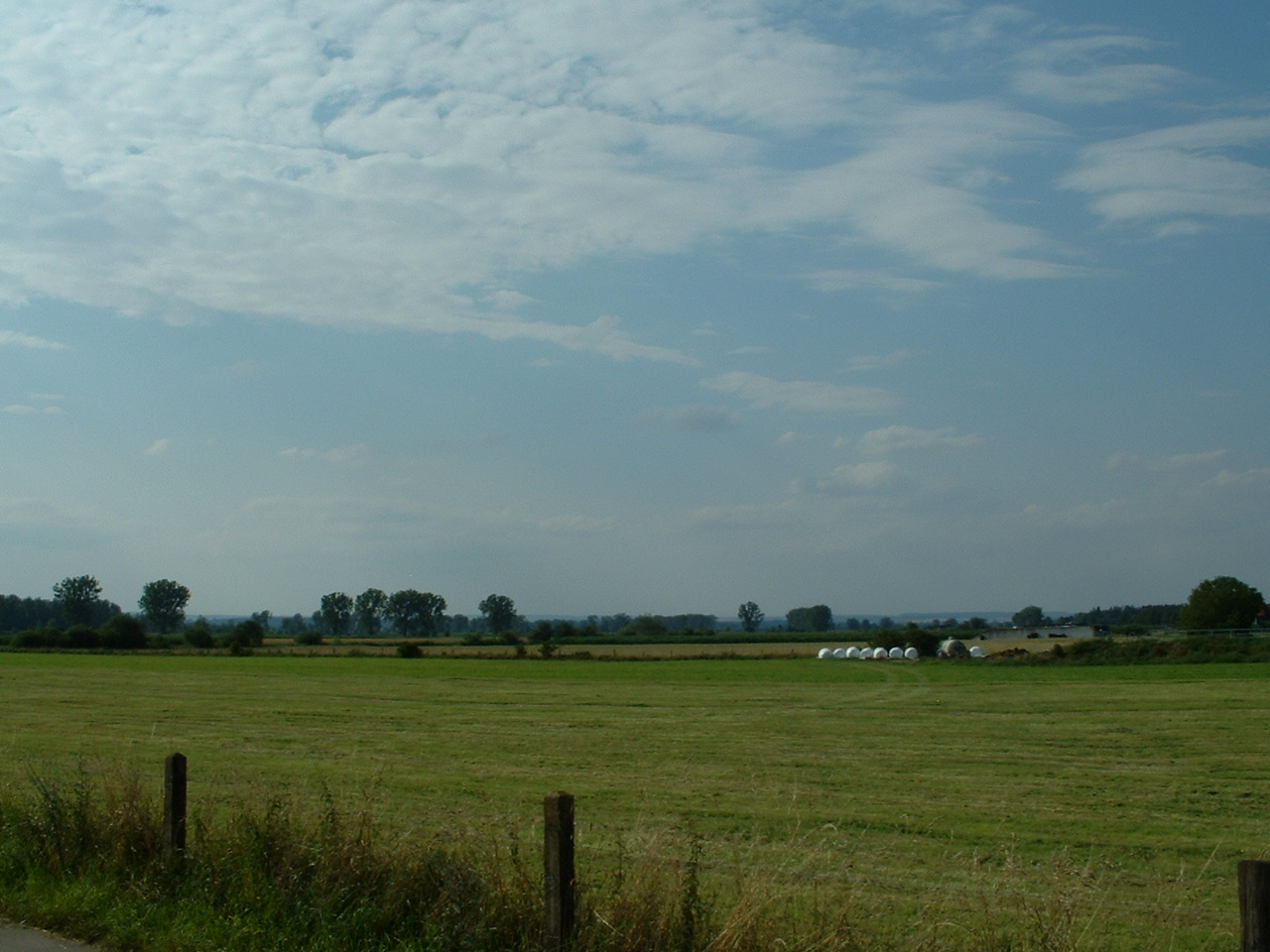
Baltringen Bog, now drained

Baltringen is a once autonomous village in Baden-Württemberg in the region of Upper Swabia, situated approximately 17 km north of Biberach. Administratively, Baltringen is part of the municipality of Mietingen. Baltringen lies on the river Dürnach.

== History ==
The area in which the village of Baltringen is now situated, was settled by Alemans in the 3rd century CE, being part of the Agri Decumates. It is located on an important road, connecting Ulm with Lake Constance. This road was partly restored in the early 7th century and new settlements were founded in order to safeguard travelling. The road lead from Meersburg via Ravensburg to Birkendorf, continuing via Baltringen in the direction of Laupheim and then on towards Ulm. This road would have crossed the river Dürnach on the southern entrance of the village by using the existing sandstone bridge.

The first appearance of Baltringen in written sources dates from 1274, when two brothers, Ulrich and Berthold of Baltringen, are mentioned. It is, however, impossible to ascertain a to whether these brothers were of the nobility or not. There is evidence of high court activity in Baltringen; on old maps a place called Galgenberg (gallow's hill) can be found on the road towards Äpfingen.

In 1370, a subsidiary church of the parish church in Laupheim is mentioned as being in Baltringen. During the 14th century, the Herren von Freyberg of Achstetten were the rulers of Baltringen, also owing the right to inflict low justice. During the 15th century, Baltringen changed hands frequently. A great number of owners were burghers of Ulm and Biberach. Little by little the Spital (a hospital foundation) in Biberach bought more and more of Baltringen, so that in 1473 almost all of the village was in its possession.

During the German Peasants' War 1524-1525, Baltringen was a centre of the rebellion. The regional peasants' army was named after the village, Baltringer Haufen. The revolt failed when troops of the Swabian League beat the Baltringer Haufen in a battle fought on nearby Baltringer Ried (Baltringen Bog). Only in the first half of the 19th century, the last remnants of servitude were abolished. In 1636, during the Thirty Years' War, the population of Baltringen was almost completely wiped out by bubonic plague.

In the course of the mediatisation in 1803, the main part of the village came into the possession of the Counts of Plettenberg und Bassenheim. In 1806, Baltringen became part of the Kingdom of Württemberg.

Until 1938, Baltringen was part of the district of Laupheim; since then it has been part of the district of Biberach.

== Attractions ==
- The village of Baltringen is situated on the Upper Swabian Baroque Route, a touristic route along the most notable architectural relics of Baroque-style in Upper Swabia.
- Baltringer Schichten (Baltringen strata): deposits of molasse, created when ca. 25 million years ago, sea covered the area from the river Rhone to what now is the city of Vienna; a regional, temporary rise created a rough area of sandstone. Here, a geologist collected ca. 60 000 teeth of various shark species in the 19th century. The collection is now on display in the Braith-Mali Museum in Biberach an der Riß.
