= Pius Bonifacius Gams =

German Benedictine ecclesiastical historian

Pius Bonifacius Gams (23 January 1816, Mittelbuch, Kingdom of Württemberg – 11 May 1892, Munich) was a German Benedictine ecclesiastical historian, who is best known for his Kirchengeschichte von Spanien, 3 vols. and his Series episcoporum Eccelesiae catholicae quotquot innotuerunt a beato Petro apostolo.

== Life ==
His classical studies made at Biberach an der Riss and Rottweil (1826–1834), he studied philosophy and theology at Tübingen (1834–38), entered the seminary of Rottenburg am Neckar in 1838, and was ordained priest on 11 September 1839. He filled various posts as tutor, vicar, parish priest, professor until 1 May 1847, when he was appointed chairs of philosophy and general history by the theological faculty of Hildesheim.

He entered the Abbey of St. Boniface at Munich, which belonged to the Bavarian congregation of the Order of St. Benedict, and pronounced the monastic vows, 5 October 1856, adding the name of Pius to that of Boniface. Gams filled several monastic offices, being successively master of novices, sub-prior, and prior.

== Work ==
He is best known for his Kirchengeschichte von Spanien, 3 vols. (Ratisbon, 1862–1879), and his Series episcoporum Eccelesiae catholicae quotquot innotuerunt a beato Petro apostolo etc. (Ratisbon, 1873–86, with two supplements). The Kirchengeschichte von Spanien is a methodical work, critical, also, to a certain extent, in dealing with the earliest period of Spanish ecclesiastical history, though the author rarely abandons unreliable sources.

The Series episcoporum is a collection of the episcopal lists of all ancient and modern sees. Gaps are frequent in the lists of ancient sees, especially those of the Eastern Church. Gams ignored a number of dissertations which would have rectified, on a multitude of points, his uncertain chronology.

In 1850 Gams founded with his colleagues Johann Baptist Alzog, F. W. Koch, Mattes, and G.J. Muller a Theologische Monatschrift which lasted two years (1850–1851), and in which he published a number of essays.

== Works ==
- Geschichte der Kirche Jesu Christi im neunzehnten Jahrhunderte mit besonderer Rucksicht auf Deutschland; 3 vols. (Innsbruck, 1854–1858)
- Johannes der Taufer im Gefangnisse (Tübingen, 1853)
- Die elfte Sacularfeier des Martyrertodes des heiligen Bonifacius, etc. (Mainz, 1855)
- Die Kirchengeschichte von Spanien, 3 vols, in five parts (Ratisbon 1862-79)
- Spanische Briefe in Historisch-politische Blatter, LVI, 134 sq., 208 sg, 311 sq., 418 sq.,
- Wetterleuchten auf der pyrenaischen Halbinsel, ibid, LVI, 67 sq
- Series episcoporum Ecclesiae catholicae quotquot innotuerunt a beato Petro apostolo (Ratisbon, 1873)
  - Supp. I: Hierarchia catholica Pio IX Pontifice Romano (Munich, 1879)
  - Supp. II: Series episcoporum quae apparuit 1873 completur et continuatur ab anno circa 1870 ad 20 Febr. 1885 (Ratisbon, 1886)
- Das Jahre des Martyrtodes der Apostel Petrus und Paulus (Ratisbon, 1867).
