= Mietingen =

- Municipality
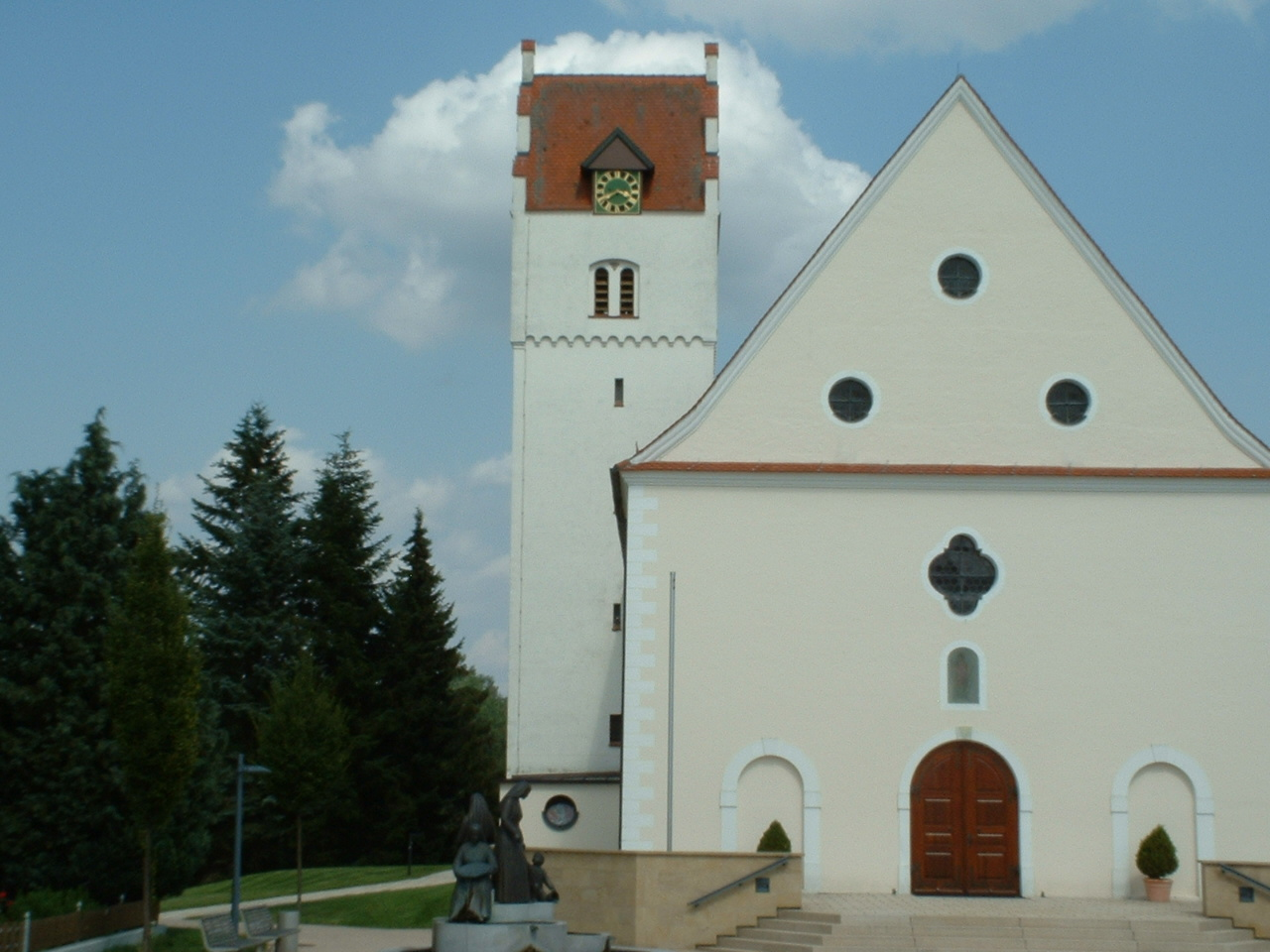
- Church of St. Laurence

- Coat of arms

- Location of Mietingen within Biberach district
- Interactive map of Mietingen
- Location within Germany Location within Baden-Württemberg
- Coordinates: 48°10′55″N 9°54′15″E
- Country: Germany
- State: Baden-Württemberg
- Admin. region: Tübingen
- District: Biberach

Government
  - Mayor (2018–26): Robert Hochdorfer

Area
  - Total: 26.33 km^{2} (10.17 sq mi)
- Elevation: 524 m (1,719 ft)

Population (2025-12-31)
  - Total: 4,758
  - Density: 180.7/km^{2} (468.0/sq mi)
- Time zone: UTC+01:00 (CET)
  - Summer (DST): UTC+02:00 (CEST)
- Postal codes: 88487
- Dialling codes: 07392, 07353, 07356
- Vehicle registration: BC
- Website: www.mietingen.de

Mietingen (German pronunciation: [ˈmiːtɪŋən]) is a municipality in Baden-Württemberg in the region of Upper Swabia, situated approximately 18 km north of Biberach. The river Rottum runs through Mietingen.

Apart from the village of Mietingen itself, administratively, the once autonomous villages of Baltringen and Walpertshofen nowadays belong to the municipality of Mietingen.

== History ==
The first charter in which Mietingen is mentioned, dates from 1083 when the village was ruled by a local aristocrat, Luitpold von Moitinga. Its origins, however, are thought to date further back to the time of the colonization by Alemannic tribes.

In 1270, Mietingen came temporarily into the ownership of the bishopric of Konstanz. The majority of the village belonged to the Herren von Freiberg from 1339 onwards, one of whose dynastic line settled in Mietingen. From 1142 until the secularisation in 1803, the village was subject to Heggbach Abbey, after which it was transferred into the ownership of the counts of Plettenberg und Bassenheim who in turn sold it on to the Hungarian counts Esterhazy. Mietingen became finally part of the Kingdom of Württemberg following the mediatisation of small, independent principalities in 1806.

It was administratively part of the district of Wiblingen until 1845 when the administration was moved to Laupheim, creating the district of Laupheim. After the disbanding of this district in 1938, Mietingen became part of the district of Biberach.

== Demographics ==
Population development:

Year	Inhabitants
1990	3,378
2001	3,849
2011	4,089
2021	4,467

== Attractions ==
The village of Baltringen is situated on the Oberschwäbische Barockstraße, a touristic route along the most notable architectural relics of Baroque-style in Upper Swabia.
