= Hermann Keller =

German musician, musicologist and educator (1885–1967)

Hermann Keller (20 November 1885 – 17 August 1967) was a German Protestant church musician and musicologist.

== Life ==
Born in Stuttgart the son of an architect, he followed his father's profession by also studying architecture in Stuttgart and Munich. During his studies he became a member of the Stuttgart "Musische Studentenverbindung Swabia" in 1903. Max Reger, with whom Keller took private lessons, advised him to make music his profession. Keller followed this advice and thereupon studied additionally in Munich, Stuttgart and Leipzig. From 1910 he worked as a teacher at the Grand Ducal Music School and organist at the Stadtkirche in Weimar. In 1916, however, he moved back to his home town of Stuttgart, where he worked as organist at the Markuskirche. (1916), lecturer at the Technical College (1919), teacher at the College of Music (1920) as well as head of its department for church and school music (1928-1933). After the Second World War, he was director of the State University of Music and Performing Arts Stuttgart (1946-1952) and was significantly involved in its reconstruction. Keller died in 1967 at age 81 as the result of a traffic accident.

Keller was one of the most important persons for the Bach Renaissance. At the beginning of the 20th century, he published organ works and performed mainly Bach as docent and interpreter not only in Europe but also in the USA and Japan. Through his long-standing collaboration with the Leipzig and Frankfurt publishers "Peters" he became a bridge-builder between the two post-war German states.

Important students of his were among others Hans Grischkat, Theophil Laitenberger and Herbert Liedecke.

== Writings ==
- Die musikalische Artikulation insbesondere bei Johann Sebastian Bach. Mit 342 Notenbeispielen und einem Anhang: Versuch einer Artikulation der Fugenthemen des Wohltemperierten Klaviers und der Orgelwerke. Bärenreiter Verlag, Augsburg 1925.
- Schule des klassischen Triospiels. Bärenreiter Verlag, Kassel 1928.
- Schule des Generalbassspiels. Bärenreiter Verlag, Kassel 1931; 5th edition 1967.
- Schule der Choral-Improvisation. Mit 121 Notenbeispielen. Peters, Leipzig 1939.
- Die Kunst des Orgelspiels. Mit 250 Notenbeispielen. Pester, Leipzig 1941.
- Die Orgelwerke Bachs. Ein Beitrag zu ihrer Geschichte, Form, Deutung und Wiedergabe. Peters, Leipzig 1948.
- Die Klavierwerke Bachs. Ein Beitrag zu ihrer Geschichte, Form, Deutung und Wiedergabe. Peters, Leipzig 1950.
- Domenico Scarlatti. Ein Meister des Klaviers. Peters, Leipzig 1957.
- The Well-Tempered Clavier by Johann Sebastian Bach. Werk und Wiedergabe. Bärenreiter Verlag, Kassel 1965, ISBN 3-7618-4373-9. (dtv, 1981, ISBN 3-423-04373-3)

== Honours ==
- 1952: Verdienstorden der Bundesrepublik Deutschland

== Literature ==
- Joachim Faller (2006). "Hermann Keller". In Bautz, Traugott (ed.). Biographisch-Bibliographisches Kirchenlexikon (BBKL) (in German). Vol. 26. Nordhausen: Bautz. cols. 764–766. ISBN 3-88309-354-8.
- Martin Just (1977). "Keller, Hermann". Neue Deutsche Biographie (in German). Vol. 11. Berlin: Duncker & Humblot. pp. 456–457. (full text online).
- Die Musik in Geschichte und Gegenwart, Volume 9, p. 1625.
