= Hans Grischkat =

German conductor (1903–1977)

- Born: Hans Adolf Karl Wilhelm Grischkat; 29 August 1903; Hamburg, German Empire
- Died: 10 January 1977 (aged 73); Frankfurt, West Germany
- Education: Musikhochschule Stuttgart
- Occupations: Choral conductor; Musicologist; Academic teacher
- Organizations: Schwäbischer Singkreis; Musikhochschule Stuttgart; Hänssler

Hans Adolf Karl Wilhelm Grischkat (29 August 1903 – 10 January 1977) was a German conductor, especially a choral conductor, also a church musician and academic teacher. He founded the choir Schwäbischer Singkreis for pioneering concerts and recordings of works by Bach and Monteverdi in the spirit of historically informed performance. He was the church musician of the Christuskirche in Reutlingen, published Bach cantatas for Hänssler, and was from 1950 a professor of choral conducting at the Musikhochschule Stuttgart.

== Career ==
Grischkat was born in Hamburg. He studied at the University of Tübingen, first natural sciences, then musicology. He studied at the Musikhochschule Stuttgart with Hermann Keller.

Grischkat was active in the Jugendmusikbewegung. He founded in 1924 the Reutlinger Singkreis, in 1931 the Schwäbischer Singkreis and in 1936 in Stuttgart the Grischkat-Singkreis. In 1945, he founded the orchestra Schwäbisches Symphonie-Orchester Reutlingen which is now known as the Württembergische Philharmonie Reutlingen, serving as the conductor until 1950.

Grischkat was in 1926 the first in Württemberg to perform Bach's St John Passion without cuts, and with period instruments. In 1935 he conducted Bach's St Matthew Passion in historically informed performance, which became influential in southern Germany.

To celebrate Bach's bicentenary of death in 1950, Grischkat compiled single movement cantata, with new texts, to a concert Vom Reiche Gottes (Of God's Kingdom), following an idea by Albert Schweitzer.

Grischkat was at the same time the church musician of the Christuskirche in Reutlingen and from 1950 a professor of choral conducting at the Musikhochschule Stuttgart. Among his students were Frieder Bernius, Wolfgang Gönnenwein, Hanns-Friedrich Kunz and Helmuth Rilling.

He edited and published for Hänssler the series Die Kantate, offering sheet music of sacred works and background. He died in Stuttgart.

== Recording ==
Grischkat recorded many Bach cantatas with the Schwäbischer Singkreis, beginning in 1951 with Jauchzet Gott in allen Landen, BWV 51, with soloist Margot Guilleaume and the Bach-Orchester Stuttgart. He led in 1953 an early recording of Monteverdi's Vespers of 1610, at least of several movements, with soloists including Margot Guilleaume, Friederike Sailer, Lotte Wolf-Matthäus, Heinz Marten, Werner Hohmann and Franz Kelch. He conducted Bach's Christmas Oratorio in 1972, with Maria Friesenhausen, Hildegard Laurich, Peter Wetzler, Bruce Abel, Schwäbischer Singkreis and Südwestdeutsches Kammerorchester Pforzheim. He performed and recorded Bach's Mass in B minor in 1958, with Friederike Sailer, Margarethe Bence, Fritz Wunderlich and Erich Wenk, Schwäbischer Singkreis and the orchestra of the 35th Deutsches Bachfest.

== Selected publications ==
- Hans Grischkat (ed): Johann Sebastian Bach: Der Friede sei mit dir. Kantate Nr. 158. Kantate zum 3. Ostertag aus der Reihe: Die Kantate. Eine Sammlung geistlicher Musik für Chor und Instrumente. Band 28, Hänssler Stuttgart 1959, with four facsimile pages
