= Byfang =

Borough of Essen, Germany

Coordinates: 51.399°N 7.105°E

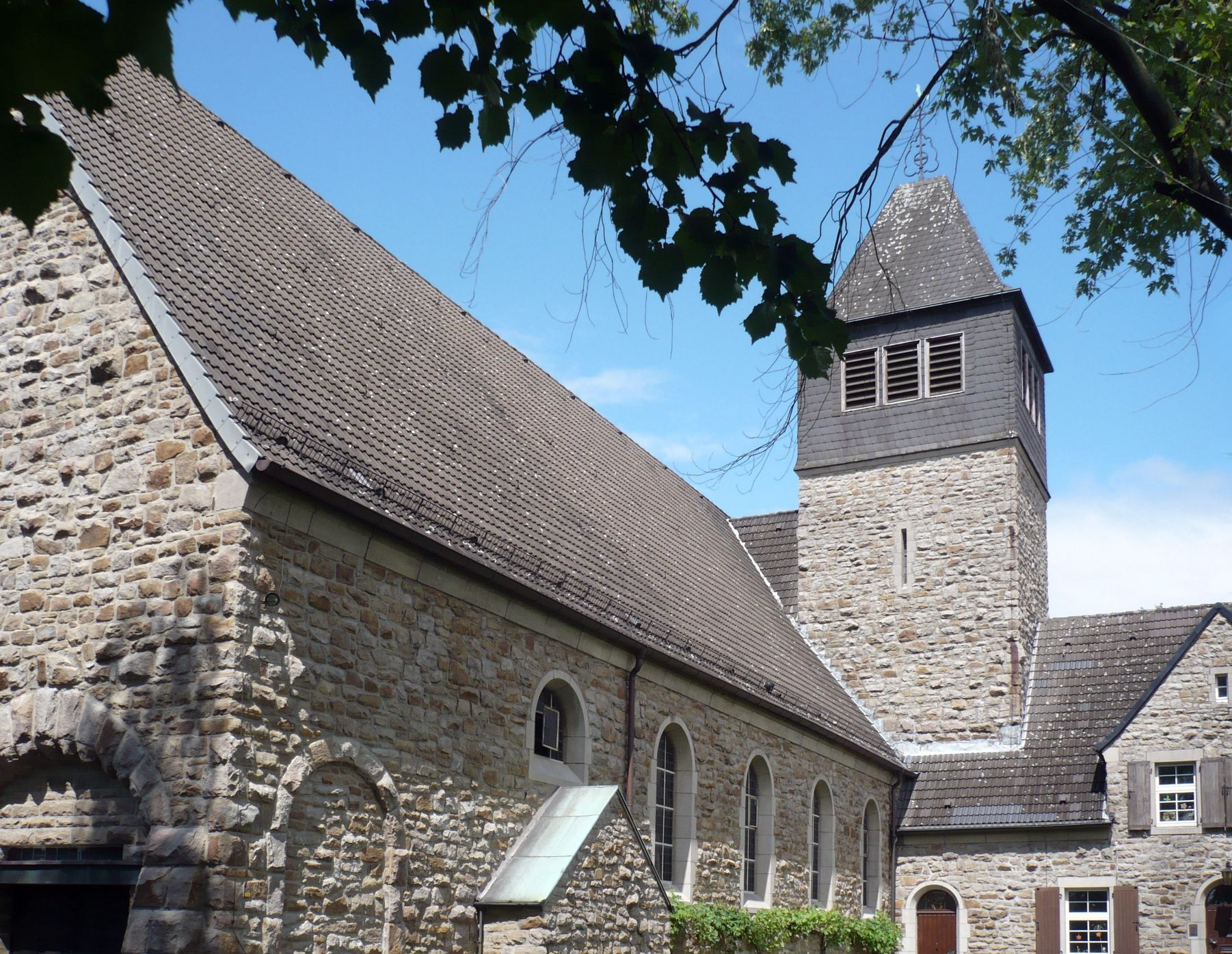
The church of St. Barbara in 2008

Byfang is a southeastern borough of the city of Essen, Germany. It was incorporated into the city in 1929. Around 2,000 people live in Byfang, and it still has the character of a village. The name derives from befangen or umfangen, which means to surround, to enfold, because it has been a settlement surrounded by forest.

== Geography ==
Byfang borders the boroughs of Kupferdreh to the south, Heisingen and Überruhr-Holthausen in the west, and Burgaltendorf in the north.
