= Heggbach Abbey =

German monastery

Coordinates: 48°08′59″N 9°53′45″E

Imperial Abbey of Heggbach Reichsabtei Heggbach
- 1429–1803
- Coat of arms
- Status: Imperial Abbey
- Capital: Heggbach Abbey
- Common languages: Alemannic
- Government: Theocracy
- Historical era: Middle Ages
  - Founded from Maselheim: 1231
  - Charter confirmed spiritual independence: 26 June 1248 1429
  - Granted immediacy by King Sigismund: 1429
  - Joined Swabian Circle: 1500
  - Looted by Baltringer Haufen during German Peasants' War: 27 March 1525
  - Looted by Sweden and France during Thirty Years' War: 1632–47
  - Secularised to von Bassenheim: 1803
  - To Württemberg: 1806
Preceded by	Succeeded by
Berg-Schelklingen	County of Bassenheim
- Today part of: Germany

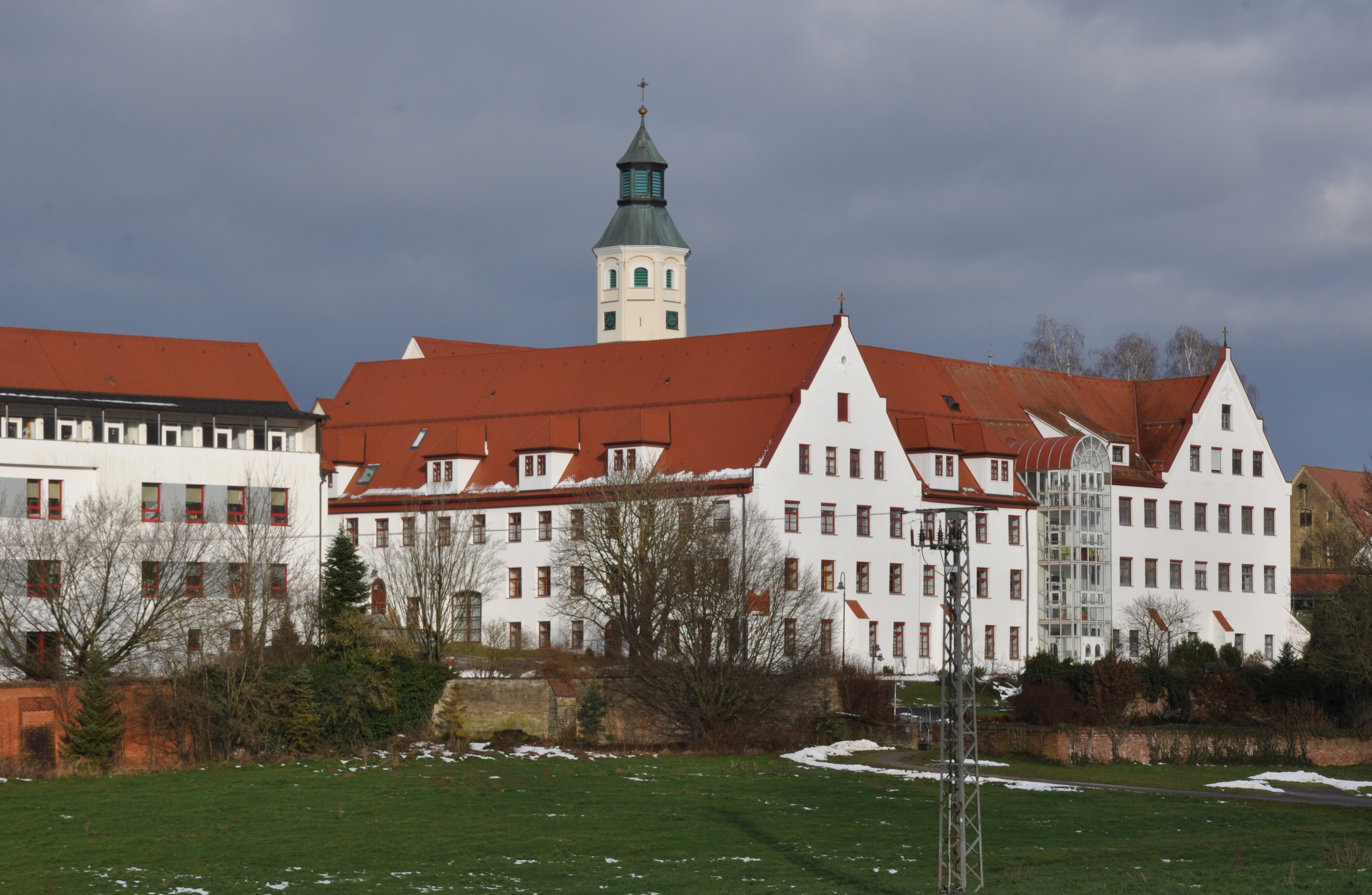
Heggbach Abbey

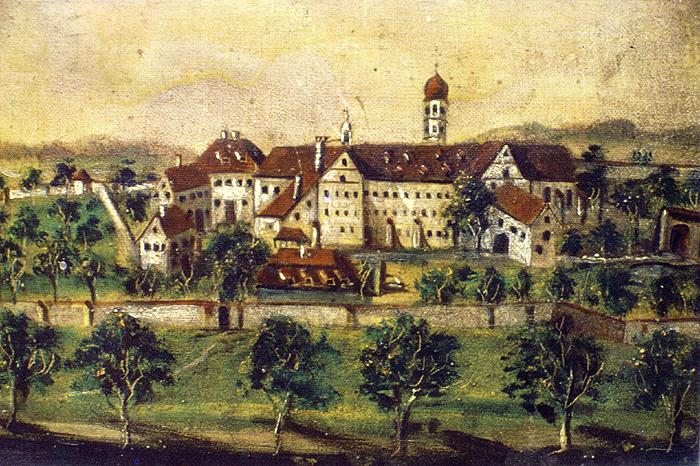
Heggbach Abbey in the 18th century

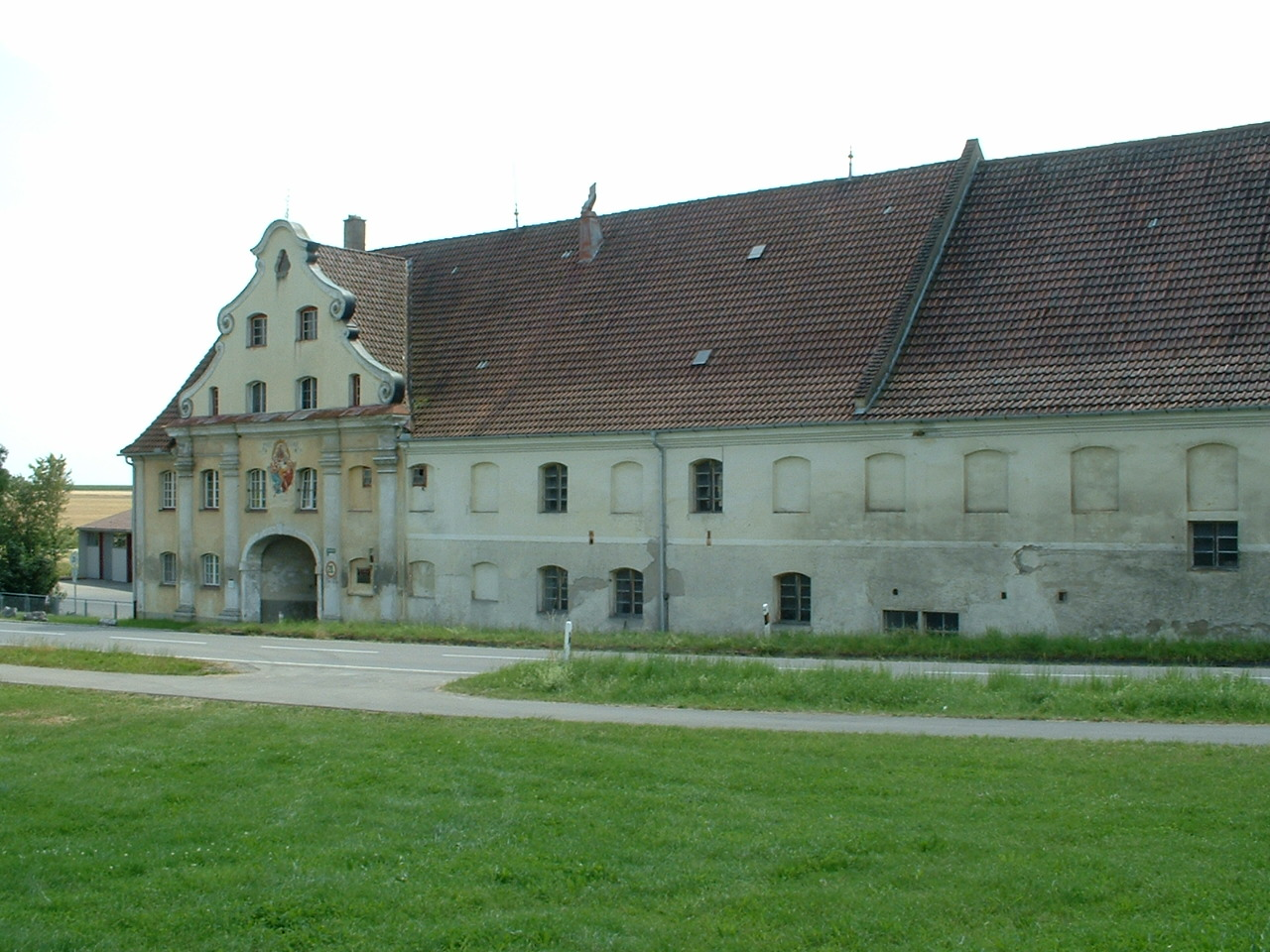
Heggbach Abbey, main gate

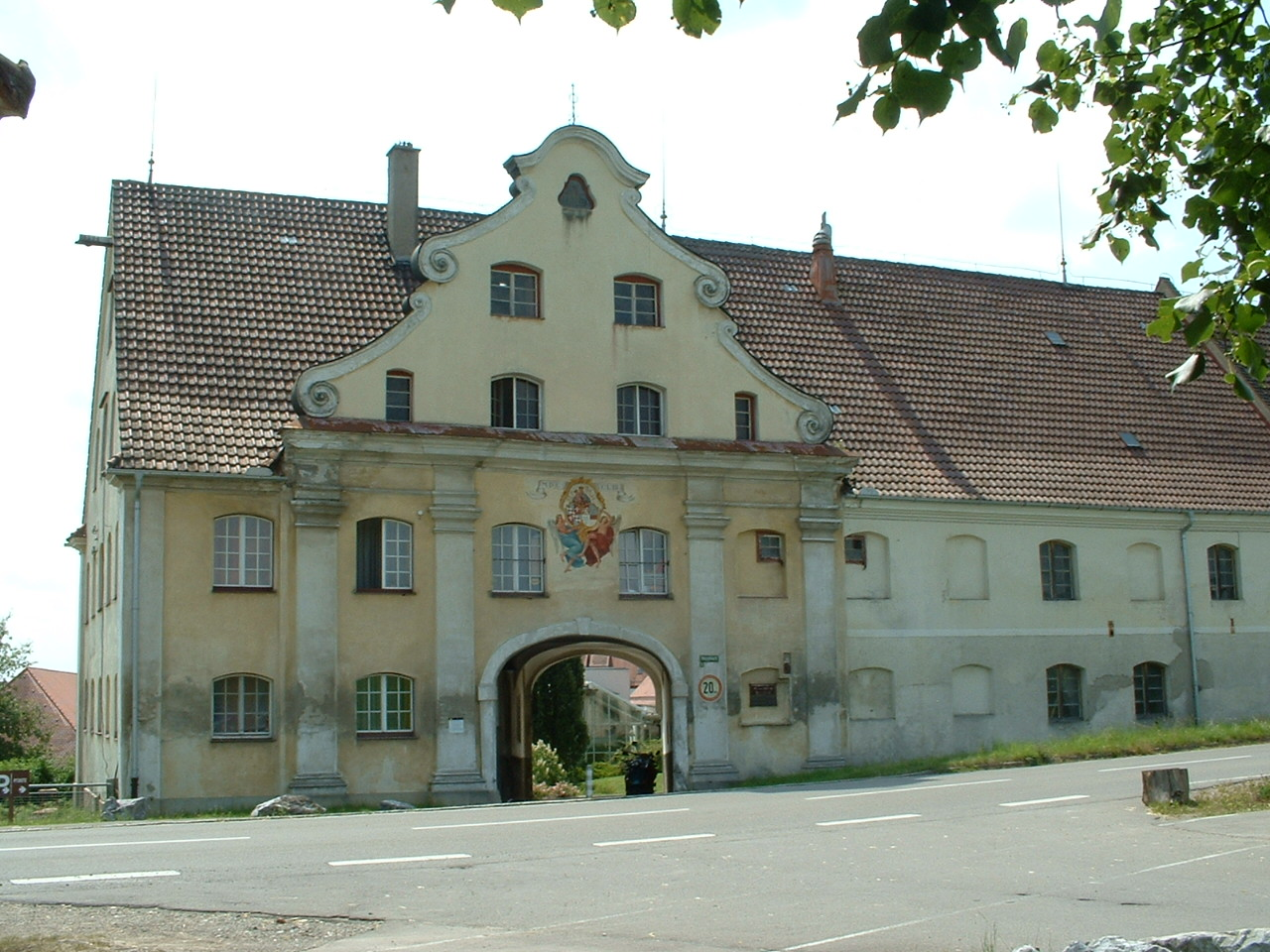
Heggbach Abbey, front view

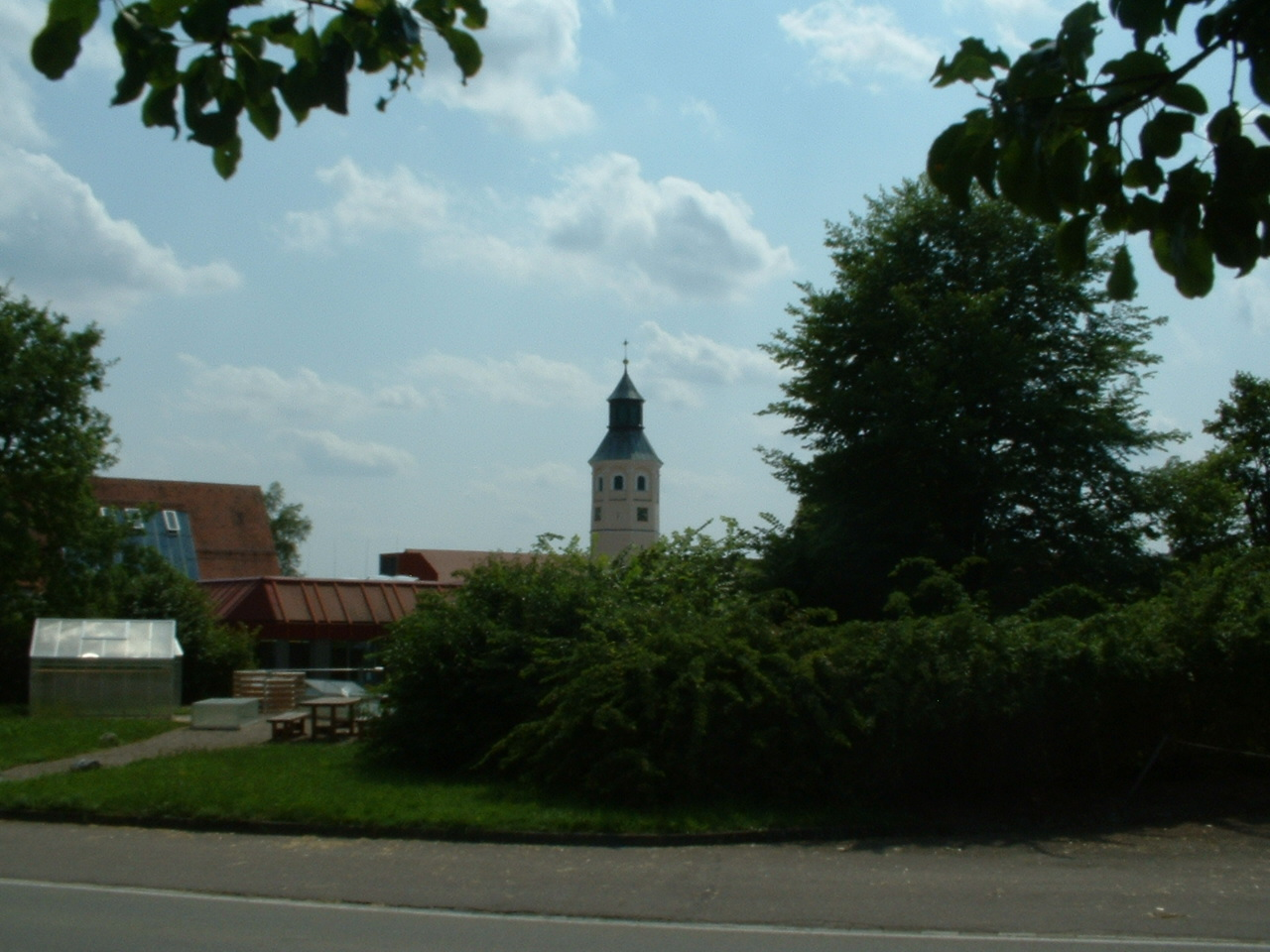
Heggbach Abbey, church spire and the modern workshops for the disabled

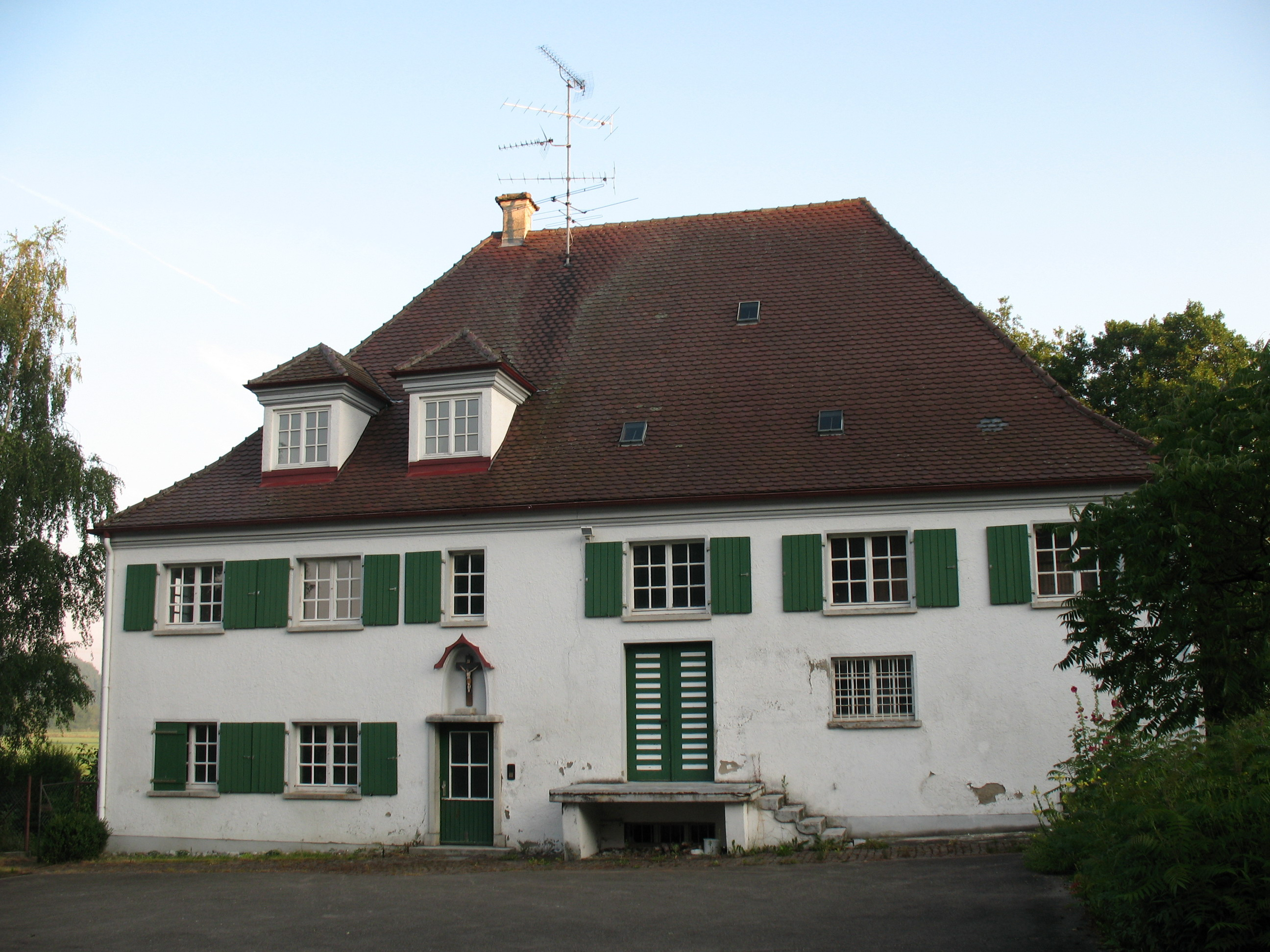
Heggbach Abbey, mill

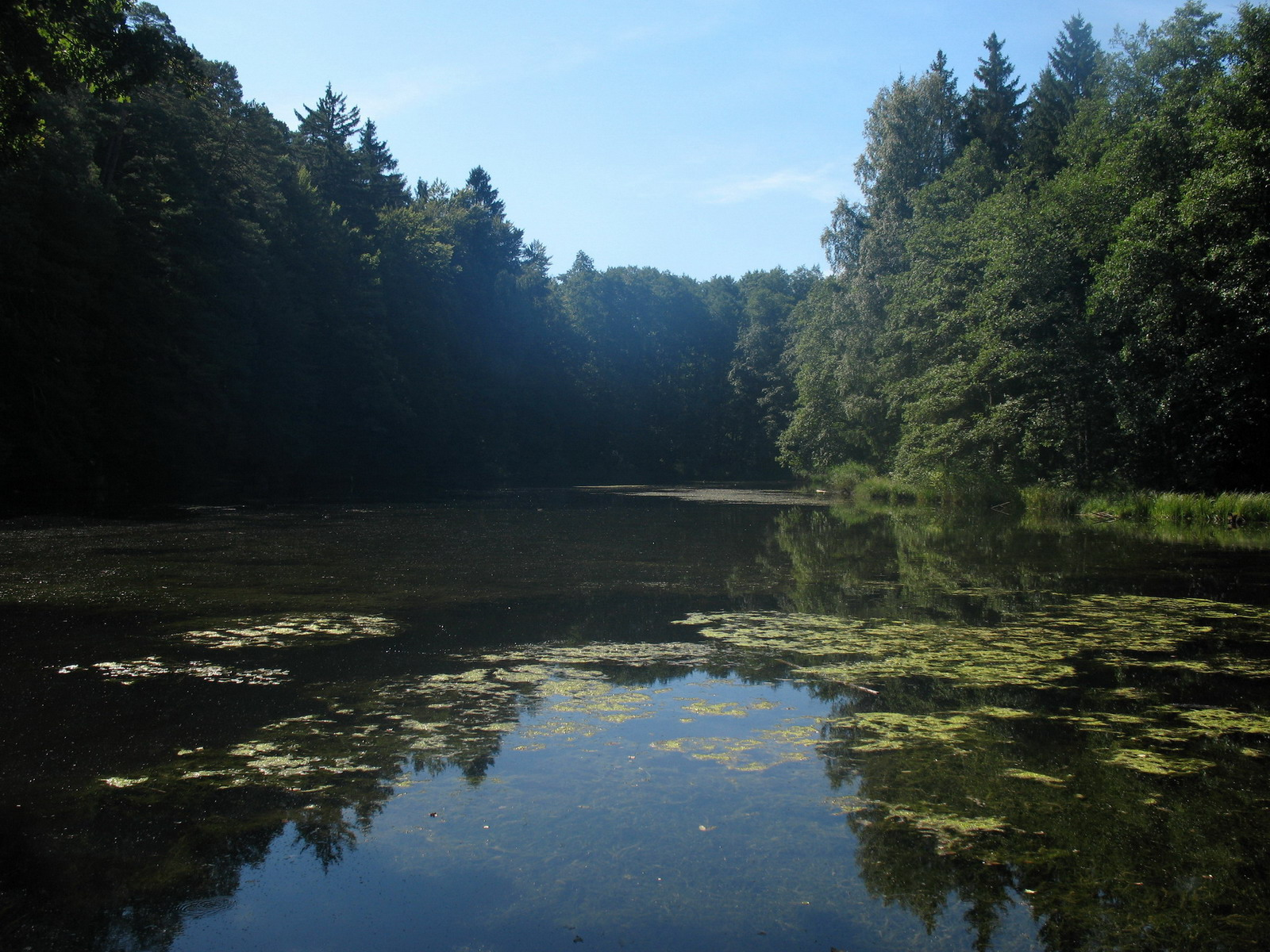
Heggbach Abbey, pond

Heggbach Abbey (German: Reichsabtei Heggbach) was a Cistercian nunnery in Heggbach, now part of the municipality of Maselheim in the district of Biberach, Baden-Württemberg, Germany.

== History ==
In 1231 Beguines from nearby Maselheim founded a convent at the Hecchibach, close to a church whose dedication to Saint Pancras suggests may have been a proprietary church of the Counts of Berg (Swabian Berg, not the Rhenish county with the same name). This church was supervised by Salem Abbey. The following year, the small convent at Heggbach was also put under the supervision of Salem Abbey. Between 1233 and 1244 Hekebach was incorporated into the Cistercian order and received a charter, dated 26 June 1248, affirming its status as an independent abbey.

The abbesses and nuns of Heggbach Abbey were drawn predominantly from peasant and merchant families of the villages and cities in the vicinity. However, in later times, nuns also came from more distant areas and from local families of the lesser nobility.

Although major building works were completed under abbess Halwig Wachsgäb (1312-1322), the basic structure and layout of the nunnery, seems to have already been largely finished at around the time of its establishment, since during restoration in 1980 late Romanesque round-arched windows were discovered, as was the northern entry of the enclosure, similar in style, in the west wing. Similar openings, later bricked up, have been preserved above the vaults in the cloister.

The abbey's extensive property at the time of its foundation came from donations and acquisitions. The property was enlarged by the watermill in Maselheim in 1245 and soon afterwards a number of farms also came into the possession of Heggbach Abbey. In 1267 the abbey received the patronage of the church in Maselheim as part of an inheritance and in 1293 (temporarily) the village of Ringschnait.

The nuns, who at first had lived in a building next to the church of Saint Pancras, soon moved into the new convent buildings, performing their prayers in the small abbey church. This church was redesigned at the beginning of the 14th century and dedicated to Our Lady and Saint George. The lords of Freyberg seem to have been patrons of the abbey since they supported it financially and, in 1493, received the right to use the choir as a burial place for members of their family.

Two of the three co-heirs to the lordship of Achstetten, Eberhard and Hans von Freyberg, sold their rights of patronage over Burgrieden to Heggbach Abbey in 1420. Their descendants also disposed of the chaplaincy of Mietingen, selling it to the abbey in 1460. Heggbach Abbey also possessed the right to dispense low justice from at least 1429 in Sulmingen and in Baustetten from 1491. In Mietingen the abbey had acquired the right to dispense both low and high justice in 1442.

In 1429 Heggbach Abbey was granted imperial immediacy and from 1500 was a member of the Swabian Circle.

Abbess Elisabeth Kröl (1454-1480) reformed the nunnery in 1467 and in the same year had a new altar built, dedicated to Our Lady. During the reign of her successor, Agnes Sauter (1480-1509), more altars were added to the abbey church, the chapter house received a chapel and the west wing was extended. Further improvements to the structure of the monastic buildings were carried out under abbess Margaretha Hautmann (1532-1539).

The physical protection of the abbey, originally a task of the Empire, was transferred to the Imperial city of Biberach in 1481.

During the German Peasants' War, the abbey was looted on 27 March 1525 by rioting farmers of the peasants' army from nearby Baltringen (Baltringer Haufen) after several complaints regarding the burden of heavy taxes had been ignored by the abbess. As a symbol that the abbey was now subject to the peasants, a red cross was put on the main gate.

In 1529, during the early phases of the Protestant Reformation, citizens of the nearby Imperial City of Biberach attempted to convert the Heggbach nuns to follow the doctrines of Martin Luther, an attempt which failed when the then abbess, Walburga Bitterler, refused to comply.

Heggbach Abbey suffered several lootings during the Thirty Years' War, particularly during the Swedish and the French incursions between 1632 and 1647.

The interior of the abbey was rebuilt in Baroque and Rococo style in the 18th century during the reigns of the abbesses Maria Caecilia Constantia Schmid (1712-1742) and Maria Aleydis Zech (1742-1773). During the same period, the gatehouse was built.

At the end of the 18th century, the territory of Heggbach Abbey encompassed five and two-thirds villages (Baltringen, Baustetten, Maselheim, Mietingen and Sulmingen, as well as possessions in Laupheim), totalling 116 estates with a population of 1,718.

== Dissolution ==
During the secularisation in 1803, Heggbach Abbey came into the possession of Count Waldbott von Bassenheim, passing in 1806 to the Kingdom of Württemberg. The existing nuns were allowed to remain in the abbey and received a pension but no new nuns were allowed to enter the community. The last abbess, Maria Anne Vogel, died in 1825.

== Premises ==
In 1875, the property was bought by Prince Franz von Waldburg zu Wolfegg und Waldsee who left the buildings to Franciscan sisters from the convent in Reute in 1884. They established an institution to care for the disabled (the Heggbacher Einrichtungen), in which today 355 physically and mentally disabled persons are cared for. New buildings were erected to suit the new use of the site, but the abbey church, cloister and enclosure are still extant.

== See also ==
- Imperial Abbey
- Cistercians
- Upper Swabia
