= Stuttgarter Hymnus-Chorknaben =

German boys' choir

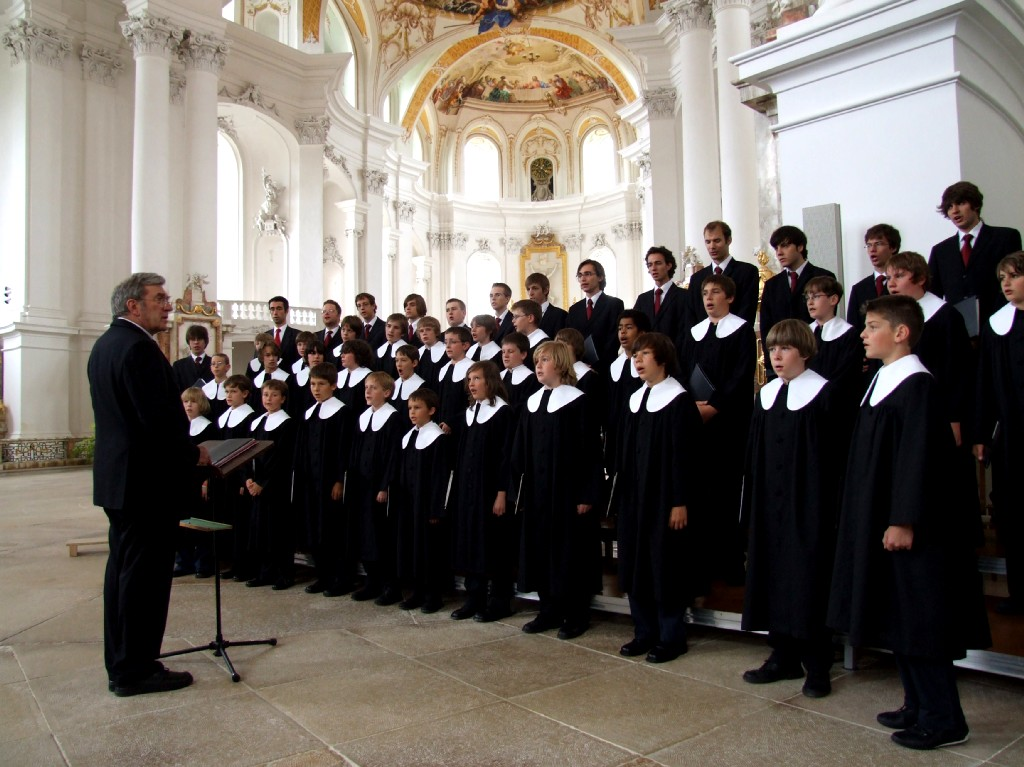
The choir in 2007

The Stuttgarter Hymnus-Chorknaben (Stuttgart hymn choir boys) is a German boys' choir founded in Stuttgart in 1900 by the Swabian entrepreneur Paul von Lechler in 1900.

== History ==
Lechler's models were the Thomanerchor and the Dresdner Kreuzchor. After World War II, the choir was continued in 1946 by Gerhard Wilhelm, who conducted the group until 1987. The boys soon reached a high artistic level, which was also recognised abroad. Eckhard Weyand succeeded Wilhelm, leading the choir until 1992.

From 1992 until 2010 the choir was directed by Kirchenmusikdirektor Hanns-Friedrich Kunz, who retired in March 2010. The choir has been led by Rainer Johannes Homburg since. Even though churches and concert halls in Baden-Württemberg are the centre of their public appearances, the choir was on successful concert tours through Germany and Europe.

The choir has a broad repertoire of sacred vocal music, especially music by Johann Sebastian Bach and other Baroque composers. The choir performs in church services.

About 170 boys and 30 young men come together to rehearse in Stuttgart once week, because the choir has no boarding school. The boys start to learn reading easy music and dealing with musical basics at an age of seven or eight years. Later, usually after three years, the boys are introduced to the literature of the concert choir and start to fully participate in concerts. After the voice has changed, the boys can sing as tenors or basses. Skilled voice teachers support the singers in individual voice lessons.
