= Hanns-Friedrich Kunz =

German director of church music and choir (born 1945)

- Born: 21 February 1945 (age 81); Ochsenhausen, Baden-Württemberg, Germany
- Education: Staatliche Hochschule für Musik und Darstellende Kunst Stuttgart
- Occupations: Choral conductor; music educator
- Years active: 1970s–2010
- Employers: Hochschule für Musik Freiburg; Hochschule für Musik Karlsruhe; Figuralchor Offenburg; Bach Choir Tübingen; Stuttgarter Hymnus-Chorknaben
- Organization: Gächinger Kantorei
- Style: Classical; choral
- Awards: Order of Merit of Baden-Württemberg

Hanns-Friedrich Kunz (born 21 February 1945) is a German choral conductor.

== Life and career ==
Born in Ochsenhausen, Kunz first studied music at the Staatliche Hochschule für Musik und Darstellende Kunst Stuttgart. He then moved to Freiburg, where he studied singing from 1969 to 1973. During his studies, he was a member of the Gächinger Kantorei and took choir-conducting lessons with Helmuth Rilling in Frankfurt.

He attended various master classes, including with Dietrich Fischer-Dieskau and Erik Werba, among others. In 1974, he won a prize in the category "Lied and Oratorio" at the ARD International Music Competition in Munich. In addition to his engagement as a concert singer at home and abroad, he was a lecturer at the music academies in Freiburg and Karlsruhe for many years.

From 1975 to 1987, Kunz was conductor of the Figuralchor Offenburg. From 1987 to April 2006, he conducted the Bach Choir Tübingen. In 1992, Kunz was appointed artistic director of the Stuttgarter Hymnus-Chorknaben. He held this position until his retirement in March 2010.

In 2002, he was awarded the title Kirchenmusikdirektor (KMD, church music director) by the Landesbischof. In 2003, he received the Order of Merit of Baden-Württemberg. In March 2010, he was awarded the citizen medal by the mayor of the city of Stuttgart.
