= Saubach (Inde) =

River in Germany

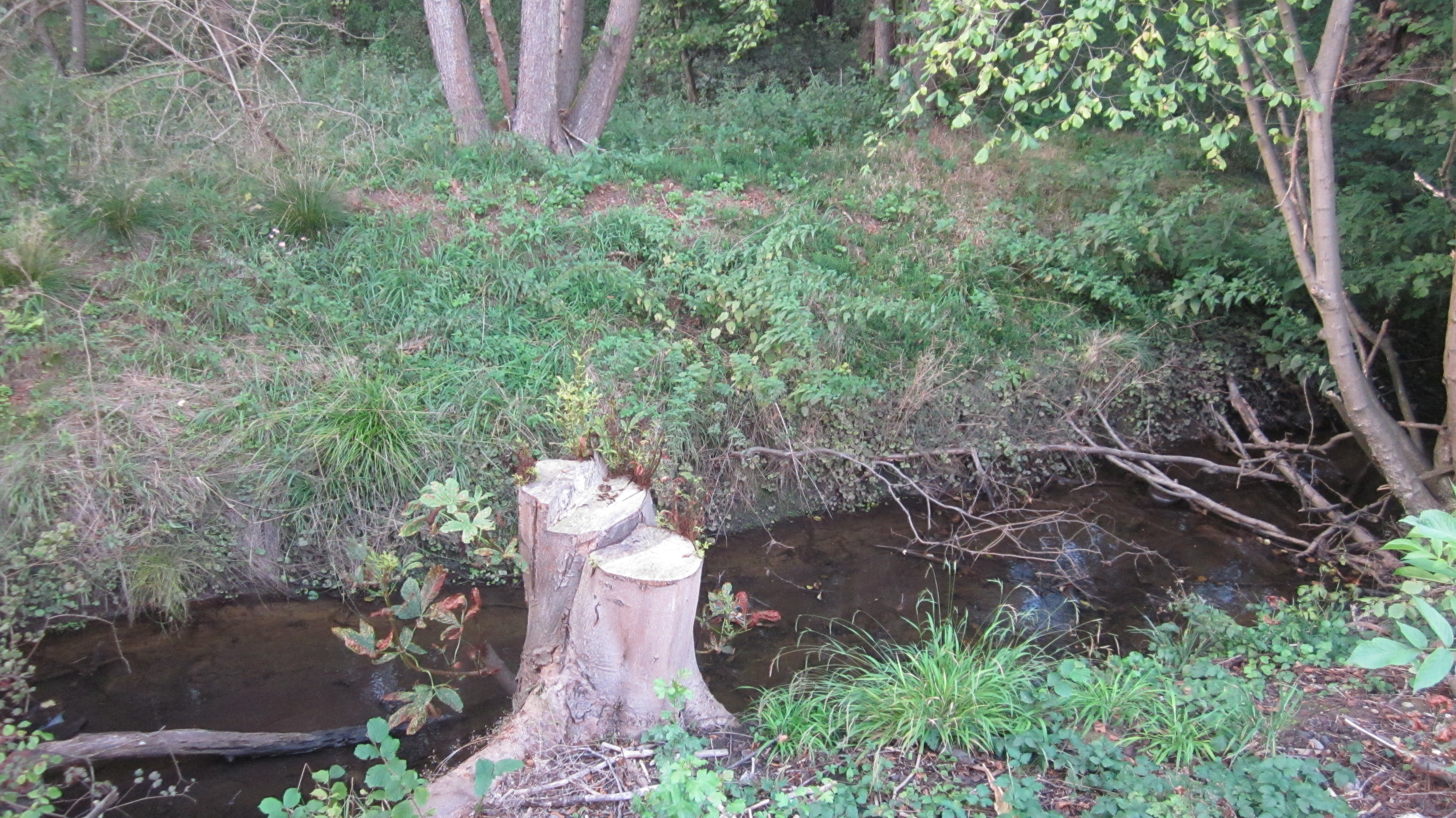

Location
- Country: Germany
- States: North Rhine-Westphalia

Physical characteristics
- Mouth
  - location: Inde
  - coordinates: 50.7941°N 6.2266°E

Basin features
- Progression: Inde→ Rur→ Meuse→ North Sea

Saubach is a river of North Rhine-Westphalia, Germany. It is 7.4 km (4.6 mi) long and is a left tributary of the Inde, which it joins near Stolberg.

== See also ==
- List of rivers of North Rhine-Westphalia
