= Nové Hutě =

- Municipality
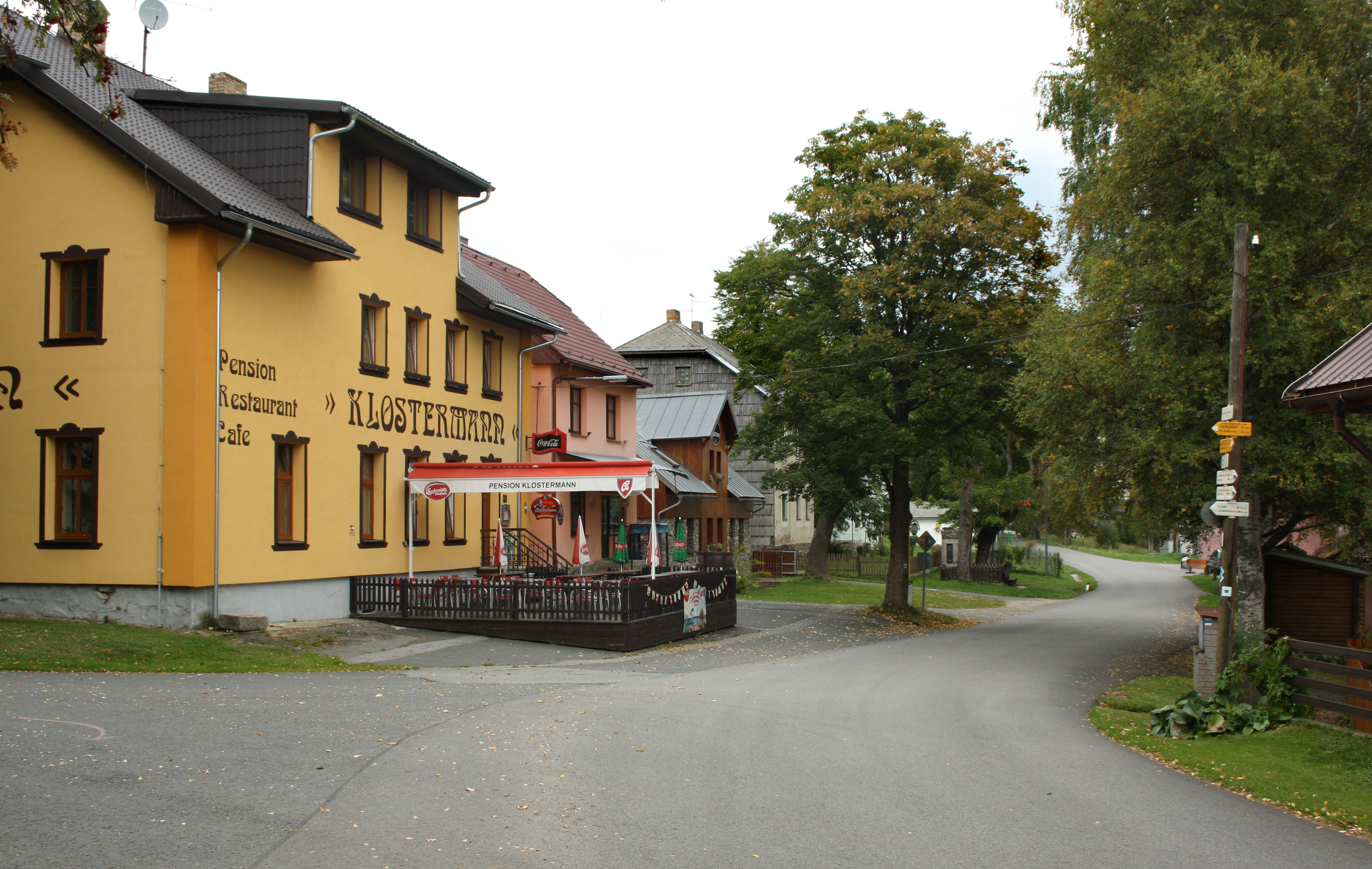
- Main street

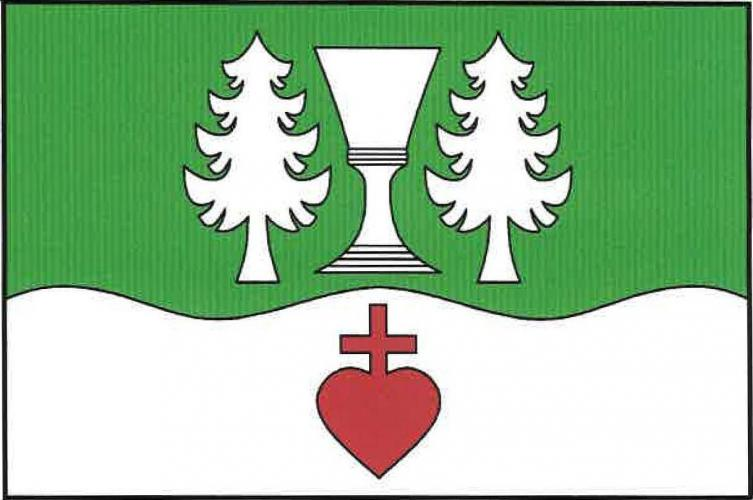
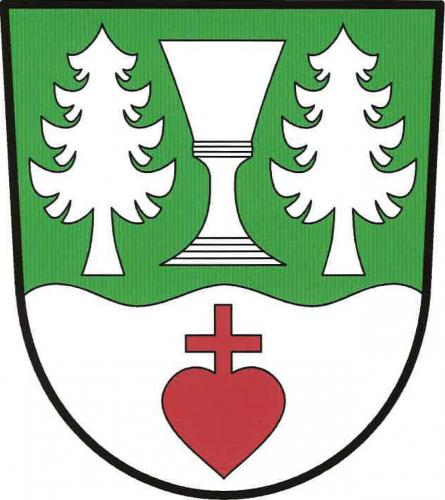
- Flag Coat of arms

- Location in the Czech Republic
- Coordinates: 49°2′20″N 13°38′44″E
- Country: Czech Republic
- Region: South Bohemian
- District: Prachatice
- Founded: 1840

Area
  - Total: 23.24 km^{2} (8.97 sq mi)
- Elevation: 1,025 m (3,363 ft)

Population (2026-01-01)
  - Total: 94
  - Density: 4.0/km^{2} (10/sq mi)
- Time zone: UTC+1 (CET)
  - Summer (DST): UTC+2 (CEST)
- Postal code: 385 01
- Website: www.obecnovehute.cz

Nové Hutě (German: Kaltenbach) is a municipality and village in Prachatice District in the South Bohemian Region of the Czech Republic. It has about 90 inhabitants.

Nové Hutě lies approximately 27 kilometres (17 mi) west of Prachatice, 62 km (39 mi) west of České Budějovice, and 130 km (81 mi) south-west of Prague.

== Demographics ==
Historical population
Year	Pop.	±%
1869	1,555	—
1880	1,718	+10.5%
1890	1,702	−0.9%
1900	2,048	+20.3%
1910	1,906	−6.9%
1921	1,724	−9.5%
1930	1,406	−18.4%
1950	95	−93.2%
1961	99	+4.2%
1970	52	−47.5%
1980	70	+34.6%
1991	80	+14.3%
2001	99	+23.8%
2011	80	−19.2%
2021	91	+13.7%
Source: Censuses
