= Burgaltendorf =

Coordinates: 51.420°N 7.112°E

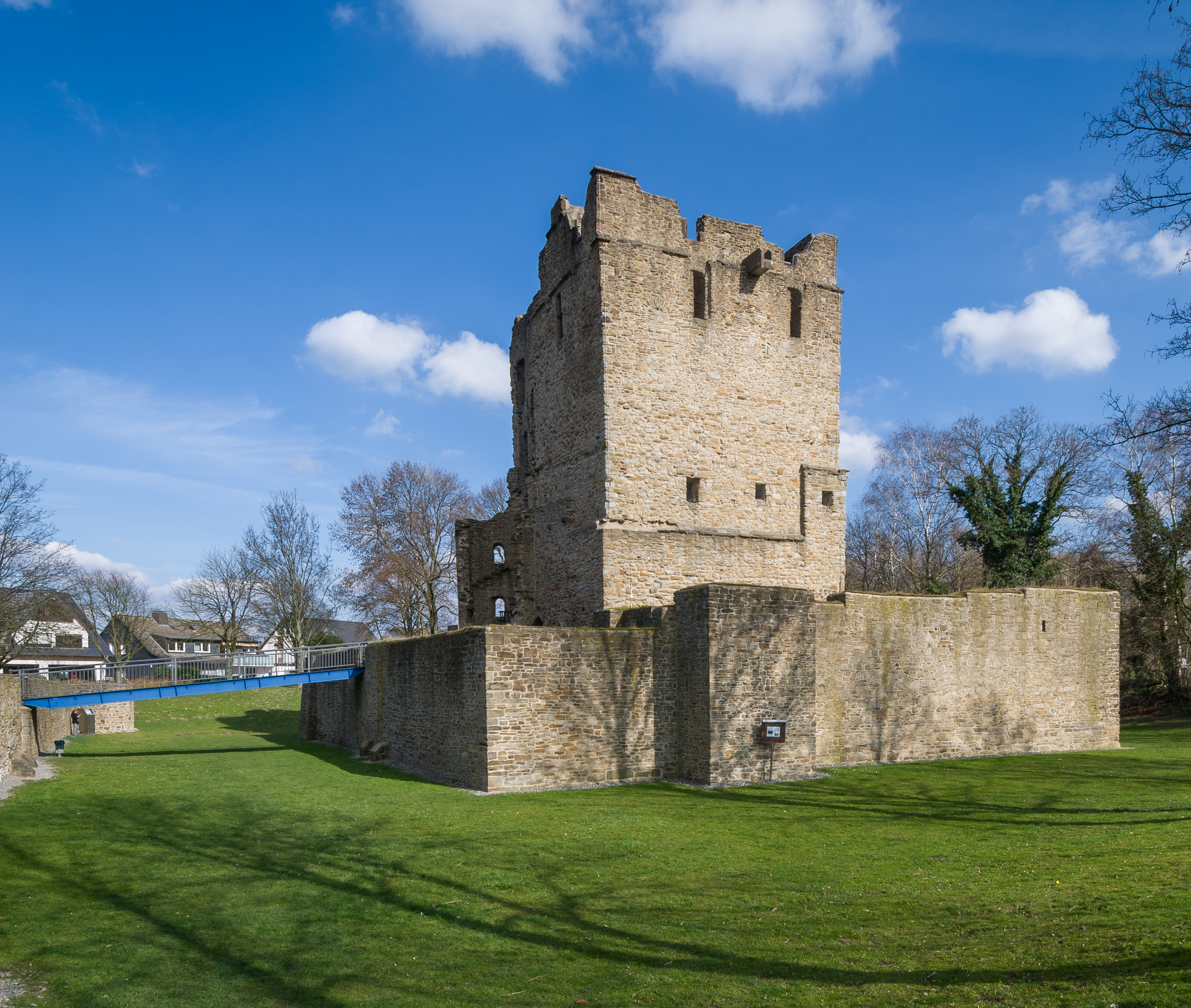
Castle Altendorf (German: Burg Altendorf) in 2014

Burgaltendorf (German pronunciation: [bʊʁkˈaltn̩dɔʁf]) is a southeastern borough of the city of Essen in North Rhine-Westphalia in Germany. When the former independent municipality of Altendorf (Ruhr) was incorporated into the city in 1970, it was renamed into Burgaltendorf to avoid confusion with the northwestern Essen borough of Altendorf. The borough Burgaltendorf is named after Castle Altendorf, which was built here in the 2nd half of the 12th century, probably between 1160 and 1180.

== Geography ==
Burgaltendorf borders the boroughs of Byfang to the south, Überruhr-Holthausen in the west, and Horst in the north. It also borders the city Bochum in the east and Hattingen in the south-east.
