= Hans Jürgen Briegel =

German physicist

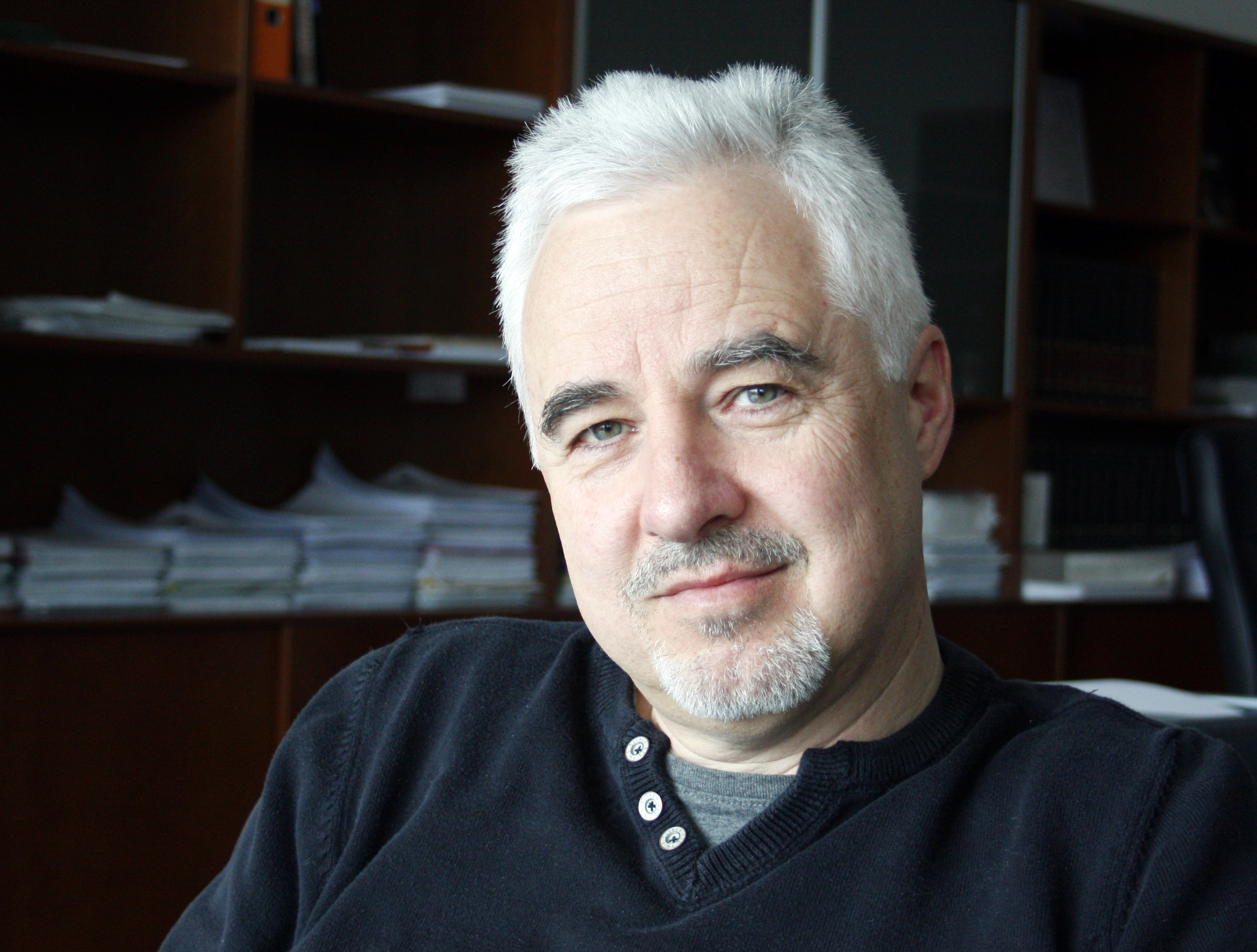
- Born: 9 August 1962 (age 64); Ochsenhausen, Germany
- Education: LMU Munich
- Known for: Quantum computation, Quantum information, Quantum biology
- Scientific career
- Fields: Physicist
- Workplaces: University of Innsbruck

Hans Jürgen Briegel, known as Hans J. Briegel (born 9 August 1962 in Ochsenhausen) is a German theoretical physicist. He is Full Professor at the University of Innsbruck and conducts research in the field of quantum physics and quantum information.

== Biography ==
Briegel studied physics and philosophy at LMU Munich (1983-1990, terms 1986–1987 at the University of Edinburgh). In 1990 he graduated with a diploma, and in 1994 he completed the PhD program (thesis title: The Jaynes-Cummings Model with Dissipation and its Application for the Dynamics of Microscopic Masers and Lasers). He worked as Research Associate at the Texas A&M University and as Postdoctoral Fellow at Harvard University and the University of Innsbruck. During that time he was also visiting scientist at Harvard-Smithsonian Center for Astrophysics. In 1997, he became Research Associate at LMU Munich and after his habilitation in 2002 (Quantum Information and Computer), he became Associate Professor (German: Privatdozent). In 2003, he was offered a Chair in Theoretical Physics at Heinrich Heine University Düsseldorf, which he declined. In the same year, he accepted the post as Full Professor at the University of Innsbruck and as a Scientific Director at the Institute for Quantum Optics and Quantum Information at the Austrian Academy of Sciences. Among other institutions, he has lectured and researched as visiting professor at the University of Bristol, UK, and the Tsinghua University, Beijing, China. In 2023, he was awarded the Wittgenstein Award.

Hans J. Briegel is married and has two children.

== Research ==
Briegel has developed fundamental concepts in the field of quantum information, quantum computing and quantum communication. In 2001, together with Robert Raussendorf, he introduced the concept of a one-way quantum computer or measurement-based quantum computer model, which presented a new paradigm for building a quantum computer. According to Thomson Reuter's analysis, the publication of this work is the second most-often cited publication in the field of quantum computing research in the first decade of the 21st century. Together with his work in cluster and graph states, it led to a completely new understanding of entanglement as a resource for quantum information processing. The concept of the quantum repeater, presented by Hans Briegel and his colleagues in 1998, plays an important role in quantum communication.

In recent years Briegel has explored topics bordering on other scientific fields: He has investigated whether entanglement states also exist in biological systems, for example in the magnetic compass of migratory birds. Briegel has also published work relating to the topic of agency and free will; he opposes the notion that the laws of nature don't permit free will. He developed a theoretical model that he calls “projective simulation”, which allows for a rudimentary form of creative behavior for artificial agents.

== See also ==
- One-way quantum computer
- Quantum biology
- Quantum machine learning
