= Kaltenbach (Mangfall) =

River in Germany

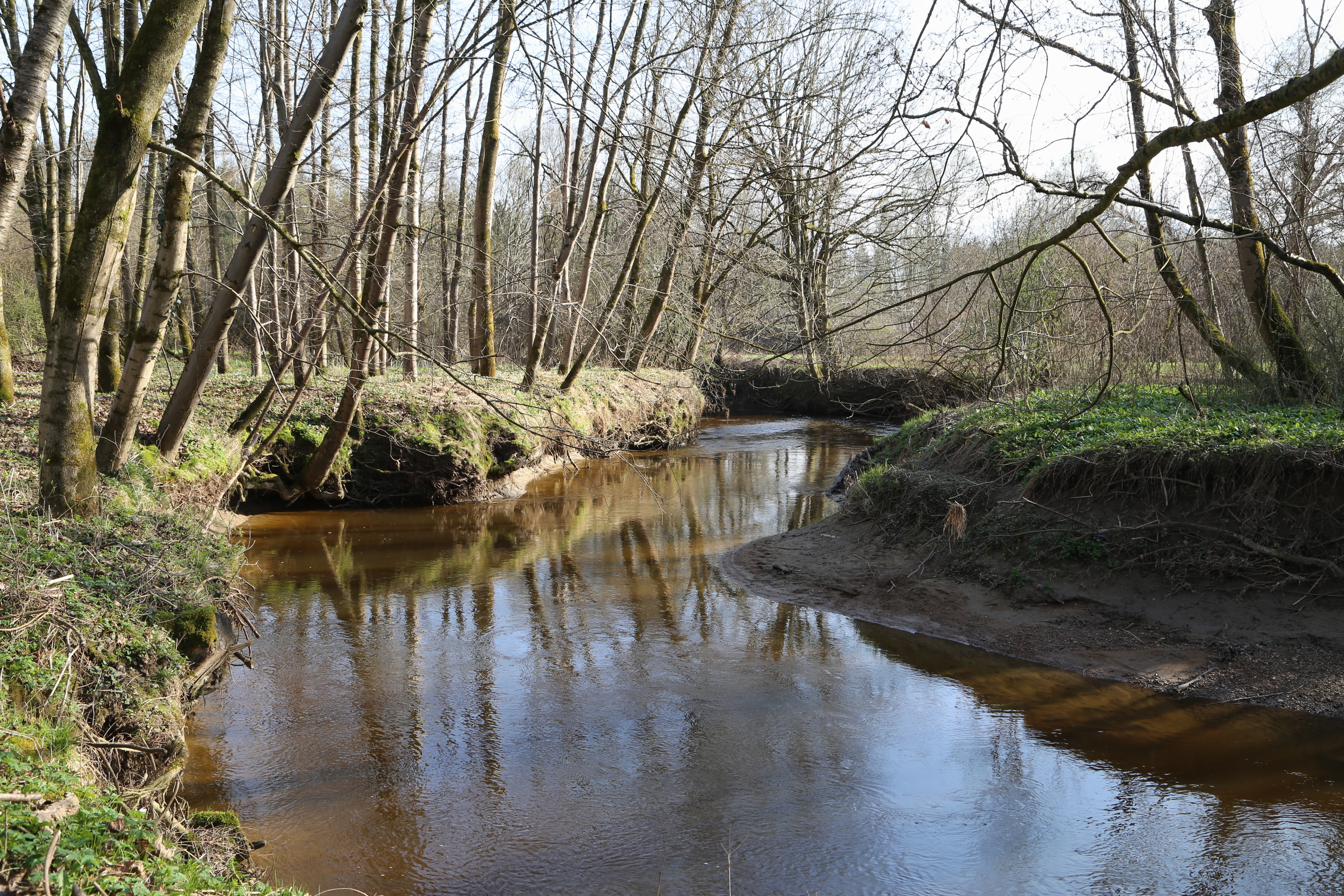
- The Kaltenbach at Kolbermoor

Location
- Country: Germany
- State: Bavaria

Physical characteristics
- Mouth
  - location: Mangfall
  - coordinates: 47.8448°N 12.1241°E
- Length: 29.9 km (18.6 mi)
- Basin size: 112 km^{2} (43 sq mi)

Basin features
- Progression: Mangfall→ Inn→ Danube→ Black Sea

Kaltenbach is a river of Bavaria, Germany. It is a right tributary of the Mangfall at Rosenheim.

== See also ==
- List of rivers of Bavaria
