= Dürnach =

River in Germany

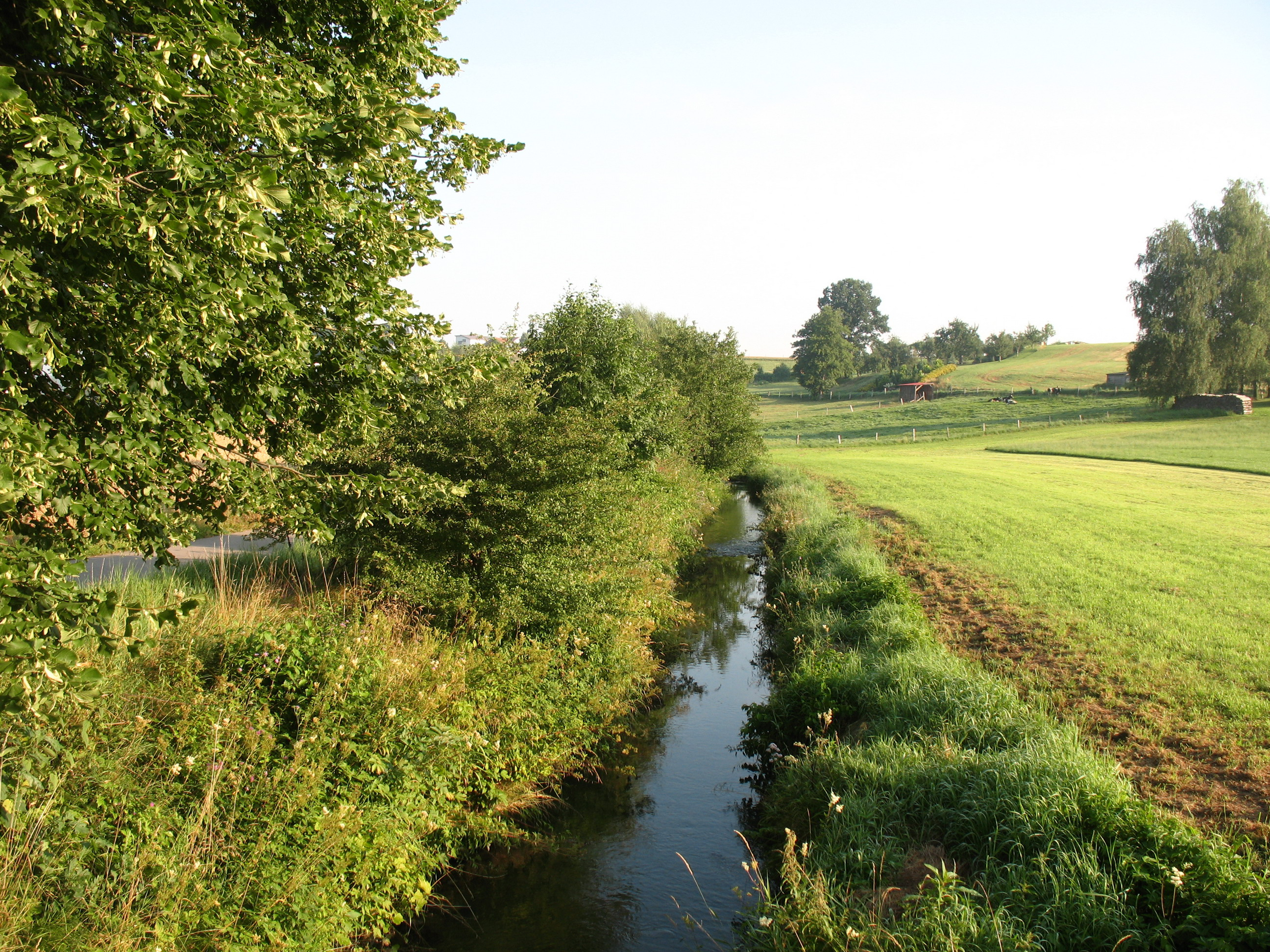

Location
- Country: Germany
- State: Baden-Württemberg

Physical characteristics
- Mouth
  - location: Westernach
  - coordinates: 48.2591°N 9.8708°E
- Length: 32.3 km (20.1 mi)

Basin features
- Progression: Westernach→ Danube→ Black Sea

Dürnach is a river of Baden-Württemberg, Germany. At its confluence with the Rottum near Laupheim, the Westernach is formed.

== See also ==
- List of rivers of Baden-Württemberg
