= Ochsenhausen =

- Town
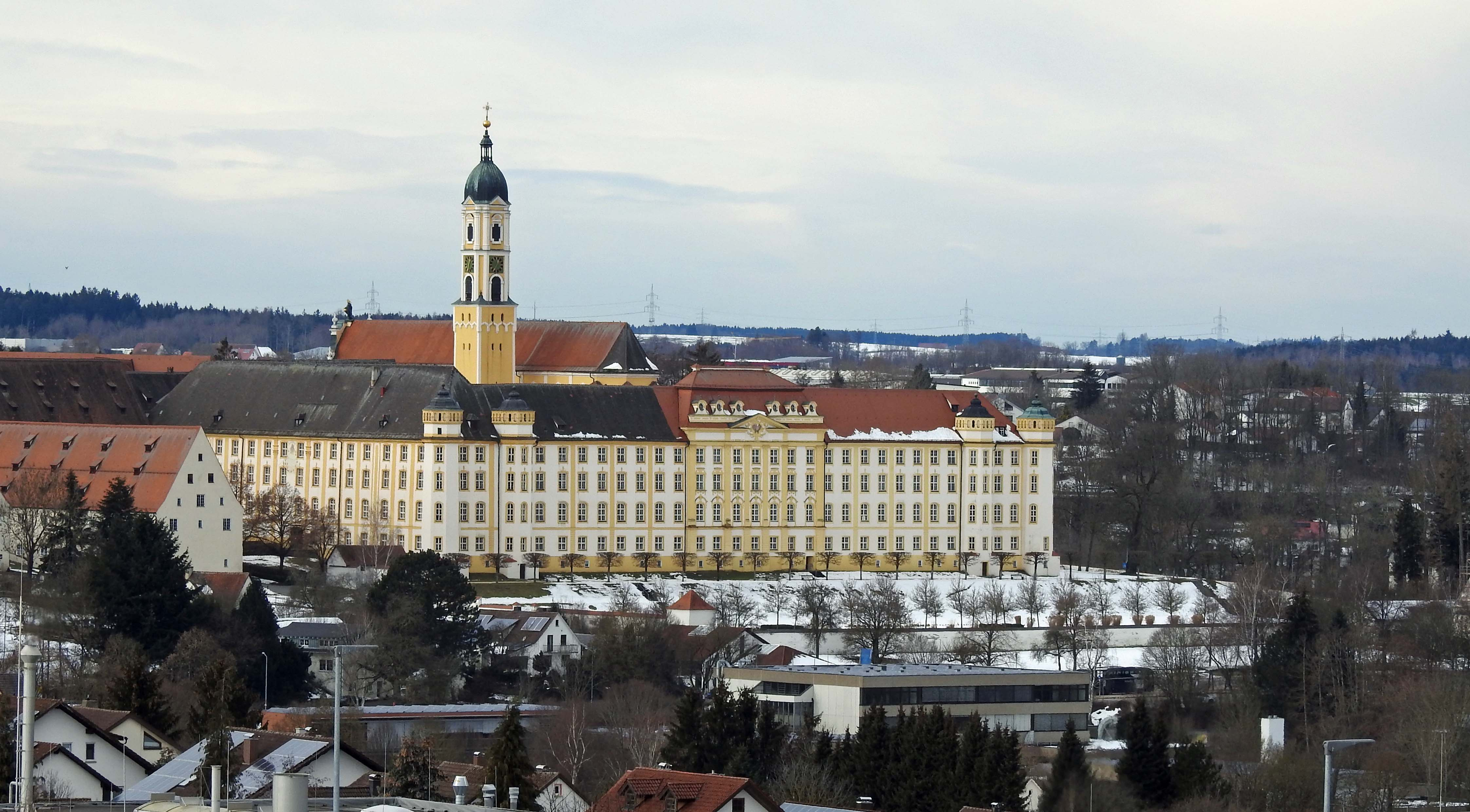
- Ochsenhausen Abbey

- Coat of arms

- Location of Ochsenhausen within Biberach district
- Interactive map of Ochsenhausen
- Location within Germany Location within Baden-Württemberg
- Coordinates: 48°4′20″N 9°56′53″E
- Country: Germany
- State: Baden-Württemberg
- Admin. region: Tübingen
- District: Biberach
- Subdivisions: 3

Government
  - Mayor (2023–31): Philipp Bürkle

Area
  - Total: 59.96 km^{2} (23.15 sq mi)
- Elevation: 613 m (2,011 ft)

Population (2025-12-31)
  - Total: 9,326
  - Density: 155.5/km^{2} (402.8/sq mi)
- Time zone: UTC+01:00 (CET)
  - Summer (DST): UTC+02:00 (CEST)
- Postal codes: 88416
- Dialling codes: 07352
- Vehicle registration: BC
- Website: www.ochsenhausen.de

Ochsenhausen (German pronunciation: [ɔksn̩ˈhaʊzn̩]) is a city in the district of Biberach, Baden-Württemberg, Germany. It is located between the city of Biberach and Memmingen. As of 2022 it has a population of 9,261. The mayor of the town is Philipp Bürkle.

== History ==
For many centuries, Ochsenhausen Abbey (Reichskloster Ochsenhausen), first mentioned in 1093, was a self -governing prince-abbey within the Holy Roman Empire ruled by a prince-abbot.

In 1803, in the course of the German mediatisation, the abbey was secularized and erected into a secular principality that was then granted to Prince (until then Count) Franz Georg Karl von Metternich (father of Prince Klemens von Metternich and father-in-law of Duke Ferdinand Frederick Augustus of Württemberg) in compensation for the loss of his immediate fiefs on the left bank of the Rhine after the whole area was annexed by revolutionary France. In 1806, the short-lived principality was annexed to the Kingdom of Württemberg, which in 1871 became part of the German Empire.

The abbey still dominates the town from a hill. Ochsenhausen is called a "Baroque Kingdom of Heaven" ("Himmelreich des Barock") because of the monastic architecture.

== Attractions ==
Every year the Öchsle-Fest takes place. It is named after a historical narrow-gauge railway called Öchsle which ran from Ochsenhausen to Warthausen.

=== Buildings ===
- Basilica Kirche St. Georg
- Stream Krummbach
- Rathaus, 1606
- Gasthof zur Post, 1650
- Klosterapotheke, 1736
- Chapel Gottesackerkapelle St. Veit, 1679
- Music and cabaret stage Scharfrichterhaus
- Gym Dr.-Hans-Liebherr-Sporthalle, 2010

== Notable people ==
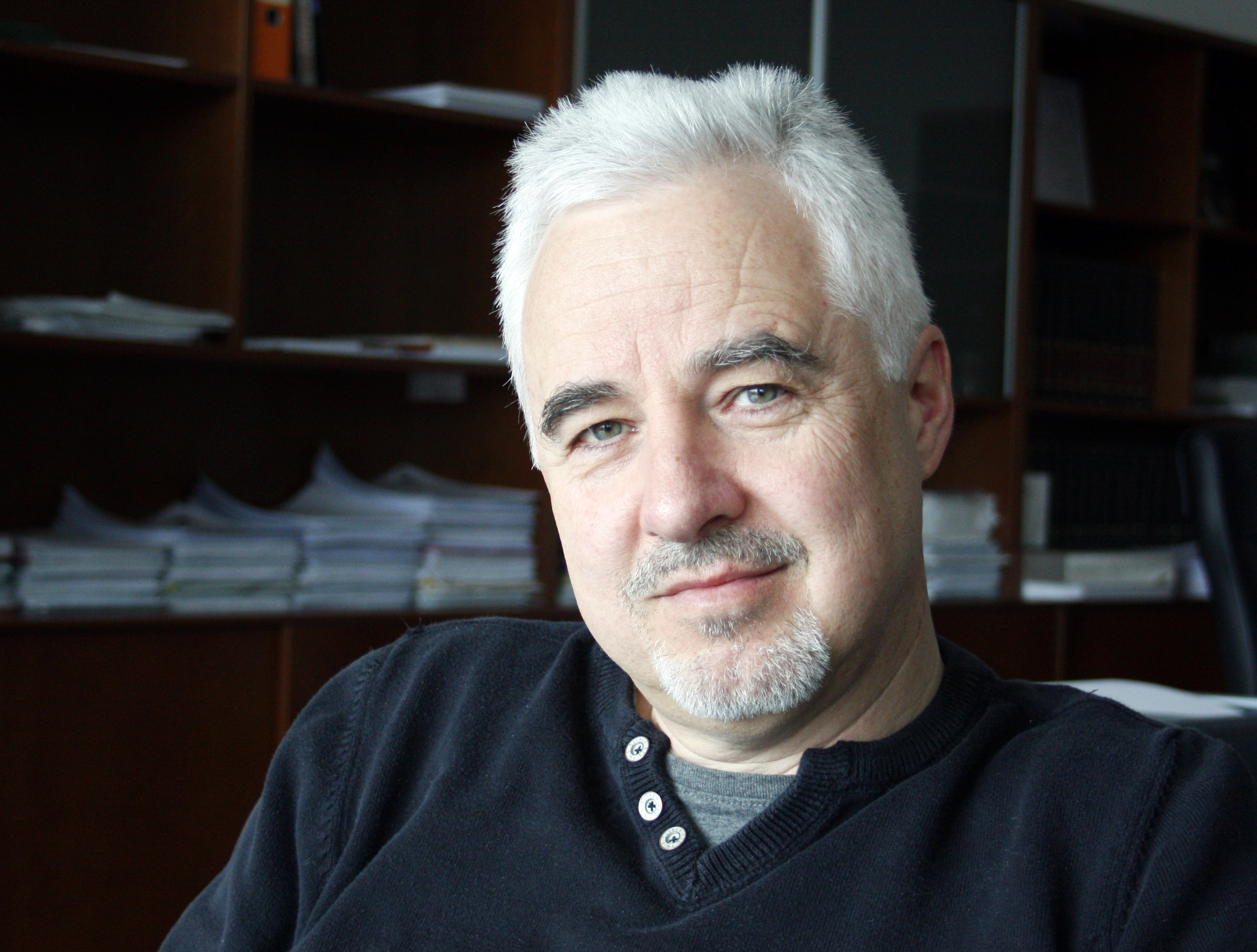
Hans Jürgen Briegel, 2012

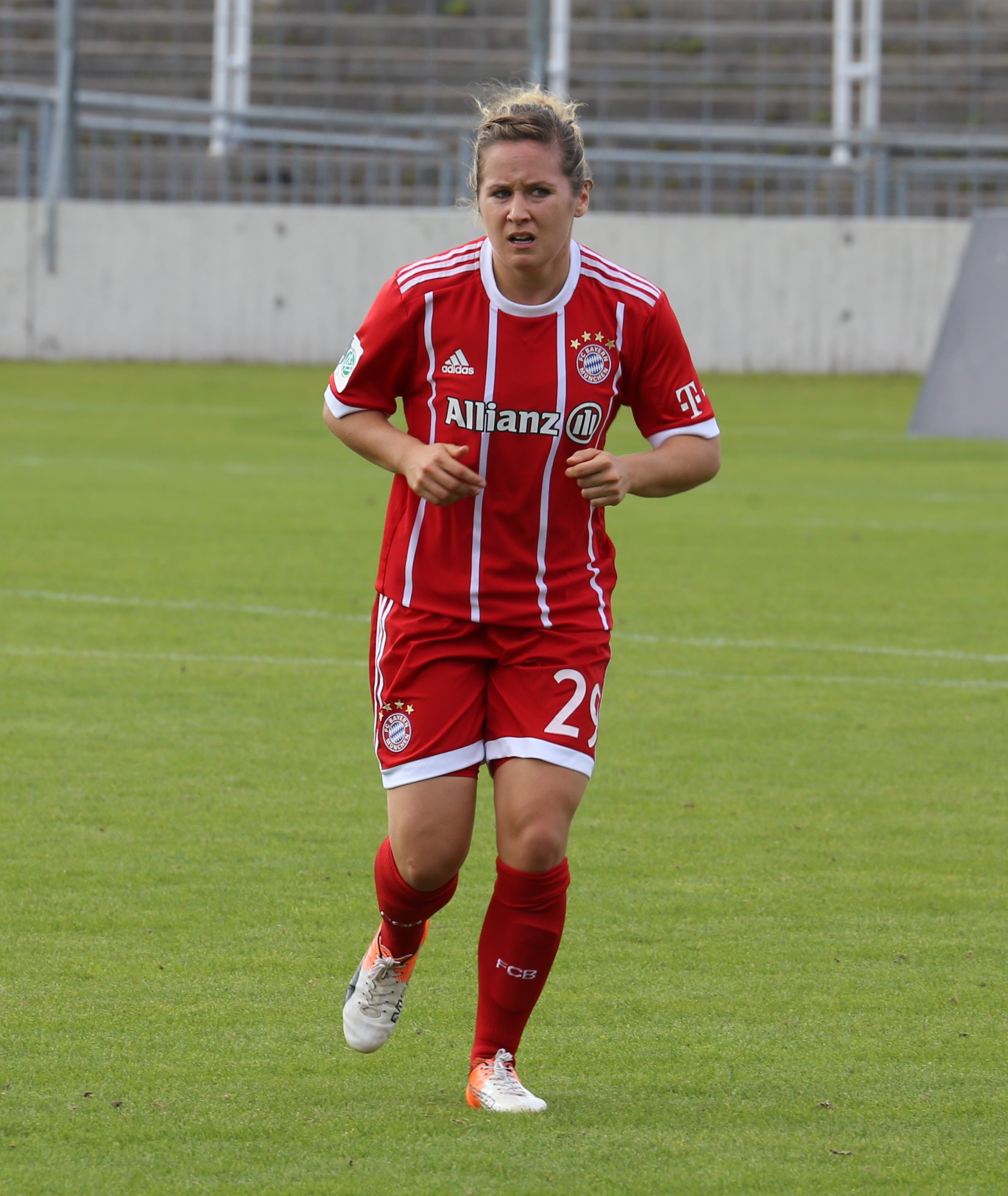
Nicole Rolser, 2017

- Pius Bonifacius Gams (1816–1892), a Benedictine ecclesiastical historian.
- Joseph Ersing, (DE Wiki) (1882–1956), politician (CDU), Member of Reichstag, Member of Landtag (Württemberg-Baden)
- Josef Hecht, (DE Wiki) (1882-1956), teacher and conservationist
- Hans-Karl Riedel, (DE Wiki) (1893–1967), entrepreneur and local politician
- Karl Norbert Schmid (1926–1995), organist and composer
- Hanns-Friedrich Kunz (born 1945), singer and choir conductor
- Gerhard Baur, (DE Wiki) (born 1947), mountaineer and camera man
- Hans Jürgen Briegel (born 1962), theoretical physician

=== Sport ===
- Matthias Dolderer (born 1970), race pilot
- Sandro Cortese (born 1990), motorcycle racer
- Nicole Rolser (born 1992), footballer, played 150 games and 2 for Germany women
