= Westernach (Danube) =

River in Baden-Württemberg, Germany

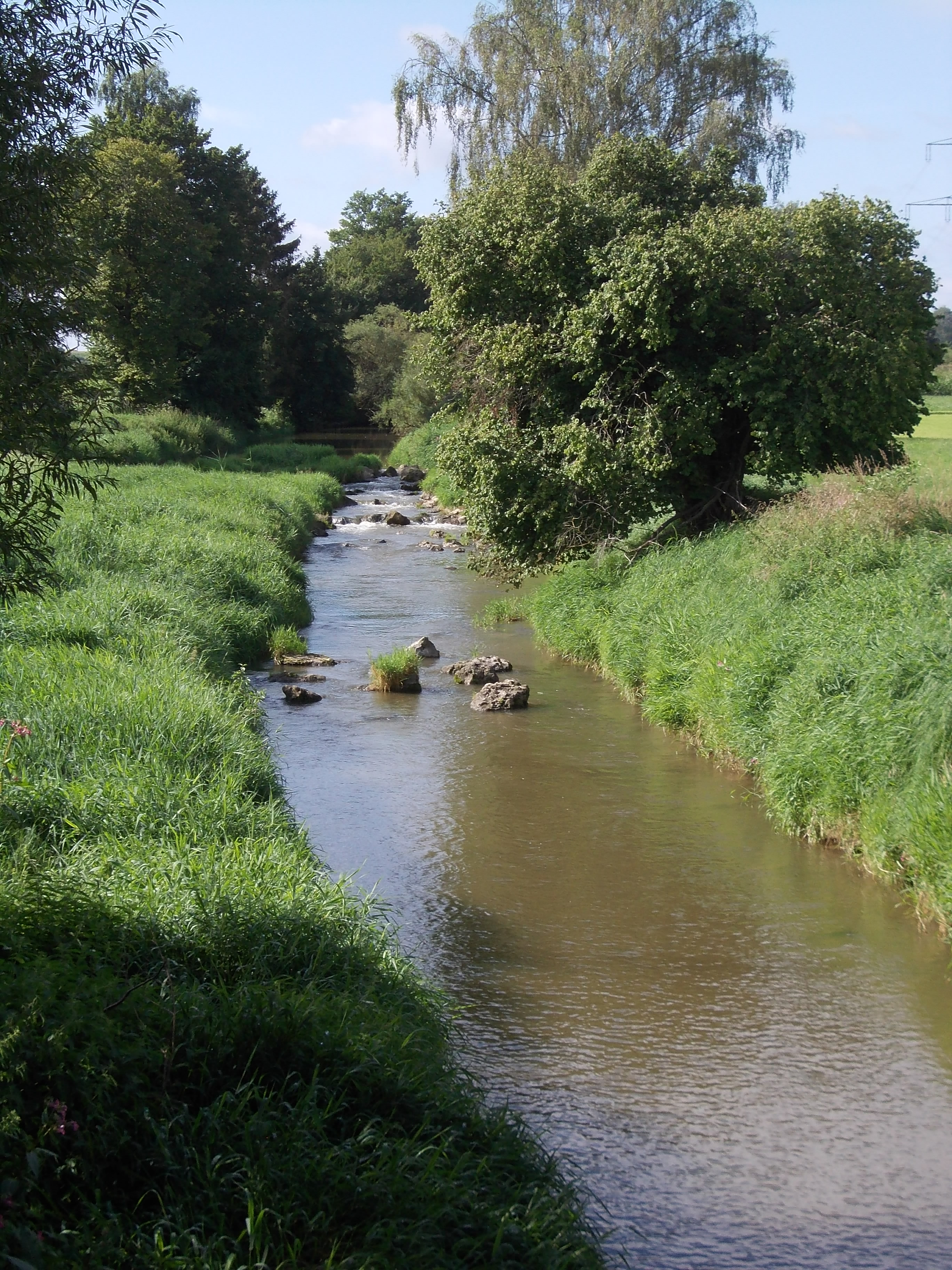

Location
- Country: Germany
- State: Baden-Württemberg

Physical characteristics
- Source
  - location: Confluence of Rottum and Dürnach ca. 3 km (1.9 miles) north of Laupheim
  - elevation: 490 m (1,610 ft)
- Mouth
  - location: Danube
  - coordinates: 48.3140°N 9.8887°E
  - elevation: 479 m (1,572 ft)
- Length: 6.5 km (4.0 mi)
- Basin size: 256 km^{2} (99 sq mi)

Basin features
- Progression: Danube→ Black Sea

Westernach is a river in Baden-Württemberg, Germany. It is created at the confluence of the rivers Rottum and Dürnach near Laupheim. It flows into the Danube near Erbach an der Donau.

== See also ==
- List of rivers of Baden-Württemberg
