= Hans Müller von Bulgenbach =

German peasant leader (c. 1490–1525)

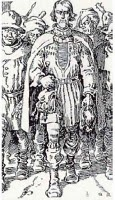
- Born: c.1490 near Grafenhausen, by the Schuchsee
- Died: 12 August 1525 Habsburg-Laufenburg
- Allegiance: after 1525, Peasants
- Rank: Captain
- Conflicts: German Peasants' War

Hans Müller, also known as Hans Müller von Bulgenbach, (c.1490 – 12 August 1525 in Habsburg-Laufenburg), was a peasant leader during the German Peasants' War. After a career in the French military, he played a pivotal role in the initial peasant uprising at Stuhlingen, and organised peasant bands throughout southwestern Germany. He was captured after the peasants' loss at Klettgau in July 1525, imprisoned at the Hohentwiel fortress, and executed in August of that year.

== Participation in the German Peasants' War ==
The exact date of his birth is not known, but is probably between 1485 and 1495. The location of his birth is usually given as the village of Bulgenbach, which today is in the vicinity of Grafenhausen, near the Black Forest lake of Schluchsee. Müller entered the imperial military service and fought in France. After he returned to his homeland, in the territory of the Stühlingen count, he was caught up in peasant uprisings in 1524. In June, he was elected by his peasant company as captain, and in October, he took his 3,500 man strong brigade of the southern Black Forest in the direction of Furtwangen, where he added to his company. Then he went to Donaueschingen, and united with the Brigach Valley Haufen, and on 14 December, engaged in a small battle with 2,000 nobles.

He was also at the Cloister of St. Blasien and the Castle Gutenberg. In 1525, the entire northern region of the Bodensee was in an uproar, and in February and March of that year, he established three more armed peasant bands (Haufen), one for the lake, and one Allgäu, and one for Baltringen (Baltringer Haufen). By this time, Müller had command of approximately 12,000 peasant soldiers.

On 23 May, Müller and his Haufen took possession of Freiburg im Breisgau, where the city fathers in the emergency entered into the so-called "Christian Union" with the peasants. Müller sought to besiege Radolfzell with his troops. On 1 July he and his soldiers were involved in the Battle of Griesen, today in the Klettgau, and were badly beaten. He was captured and imprisoned on the Hohentwiel, and later moved to the Habsburg fortress in Laufenburg, where he was tortured and finally, probably on 12 August, decapitated.

== Sources ==
Horst Buszello. Müller, Hans. In: Neue Deutsche Biographie (NDB). Band 18. Duncker & Humblot, Berlin 1997, S. 397 f.
