= Caspar Muller =

Caspar Muller Was a Chancellor of Mansfield, and councilor to count Gebhard VII (1478–1558) during the reformation, and after the German Peasant's War.

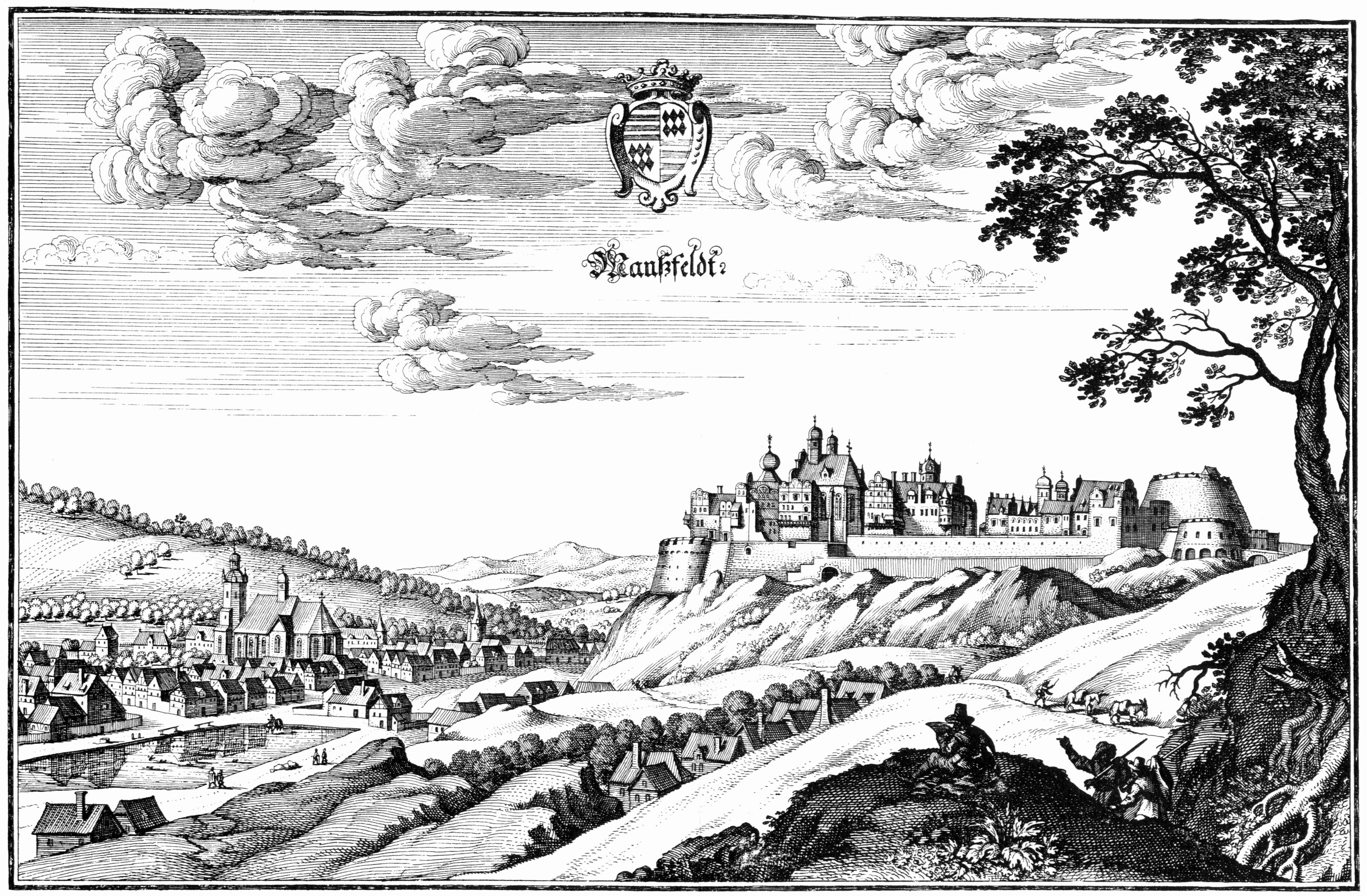
Mansfeld town and castle, 1650 engraving by Matthäus Merian

== Connection with Martin Luther ==
Muller was a correspondent of Luther's. In 1525, during, or shortly after, Luther's stay at the estate of Mansfeld chancellor Johann Dürr, Muller received the tract An Open Letter on the Harsh Book Against the Peasants During an illness, Luther comforted Casper, but reafirmed his belief in determinism, stating that “I am sorry that God has heaped more sickness upon you…But if God wishes you to be sick, his will is surely better than ours”
