= Beggingen =

- Municipality
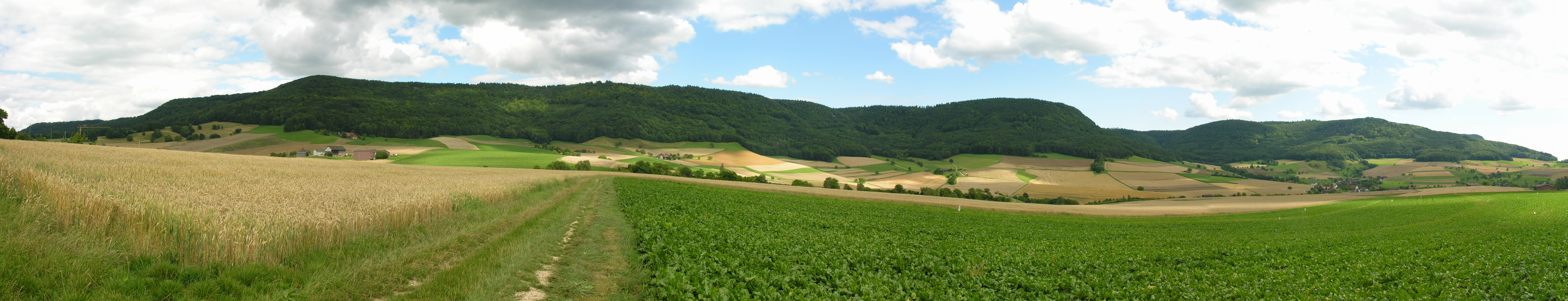

- Flag Coat of arms
- Location of Beggingen
- Location within Switzerland Location within Canton of Schaffhausen
- Coordinates: 47°46′N 8°32′E
- Country: Switzerland
- Canton: Schaffhausen
- District: n.a.

Area
  - Total: 12.58 km^{2} (4.86 sq mi)
- Elevation: 545 m (1,788 ft)

Population (February 2009)
  - Total: 522
  - Density: 41.5/km^{2} (107/sq mi)
- Time zone: UTC+01:00 (CET)
  - Summer (DST): UTC+02:00 (CEST)
- Postal code: 8228
- SFOS number: 2951
- ISO 3166 code: CH-SH
- Surrounded by: Blumberg (DE-BW), Hemmental, Merishausen, Schleitheim
- Website: beggingen.ch

Beggingen is a municipality in the canton of Schaffhausen in Switzerland.

== History ==
Aerial view (1948)

Beggingen is first mentioned in 1278 as Beggingen. Later it was known as Beckingen and Böckingen.

== Coat of arms ==
The blazon of the municipal coat of arms is Vert two Ploughshares in pale touching in point.

== Geography ==
Beggingen has an area, as of 2006, of 12.6 km^{2} (4.9 sq mi). Of this area, 50.3% is used for agricultural purposes, while 45.1% is forested. Of the rest of the land, 4.4% is settled (buildings or roads) and the remainder (0.2%) is non-productive (rivers, glaciers or mountains).

The municipality is located in the Schleitheim district. It is on the border with Germany and is north-east of Schleitheim in a valley on the west foot of the Randen range.

== Demographics ==
Beggingen has a population (as of 2008) of 512, of which 4.7% are foreign nationals. Of the foreign population, (as of 2008), 73.3% are from Germany, 3.3% are from Italy, 6.7% are from Serbia, and 16.7% are from another country. Over the last 10 years the population has decreased at a rate of -4.8%. Most of the population (as of 2000) speaks German (97.2%), with English being second most common ( 0.8%) and Italian being third ( 0.4%).

The age distribution of the population (as of 2008) is children and teenagers (0–19 years old) make up 26.4% of the population, while adults (20–64 years old) make up 57.4% and seniors (over 64 years old) make up 16.2%.

In the 2007 federal election the most popular party was the SVP which received 67.7% of the vote. The next two most popular parties were the SP (17.2%), and the FDP (15.2%) .

The entire Swiss population is generally well educated. In Beggingen about 81.2% of the population (between age 25–64) have completed either non-mandatory upper secondary education or additional higher education (either university or a Fachhochschule). In Beggingen, as of 2007, 2.36% of the population is attending kindergarten or another pre-school, 9.25% are attending a Primary School, 5.71% attend a lower level Secondary School, and 3.74% attend a higher level Secondary School.

As of 2000, 10% of the population belonged to the Roman Catholic Church and 81.2% belonged to the Swiss Reformed Church.

The historical population is given in the following table:

year	population
1715	679
1842	1,438
1850	1,251
1900	803
1950	554
1990	441
2000	500

== Industry ==
Beggingen has an unemployment rate of 0.42%. As of 2005, there were 73 people employed in the primary economic sector and about 29 businesses involved in this sector. 17 people are employed in the secondary sector and there are 7 businesses in this sector. 68 people are employed in the tertiary sector, with 13 businesses in this sector.

As of 2008 the mid year average unemployment rate was 1%. There were 20 non-agrarian businesses in the municipality and 31.9% of the (non-agrarian) population was involved in the secondary sector of the economy while 68.1% were involved in the third. At the same time, 73.6% of the working population was employed full-time, and 26.4% was employed part-time. There were 72 residents of the municipality were employed in some capacity, of which females made up 25% of the workforce. As of 2000 there were 83 residents who worked in the municipality, while 140 residents worked outside Beggingen and 18 people commuted into the municipality for work.

As of 2008, there is 1 restaurant. The hospitality industry in Beggingen employs 3 people.
