= Florian Geyer =

German nobleman and knight (c. 1490–1525)

Reichsritter Florian Geyer
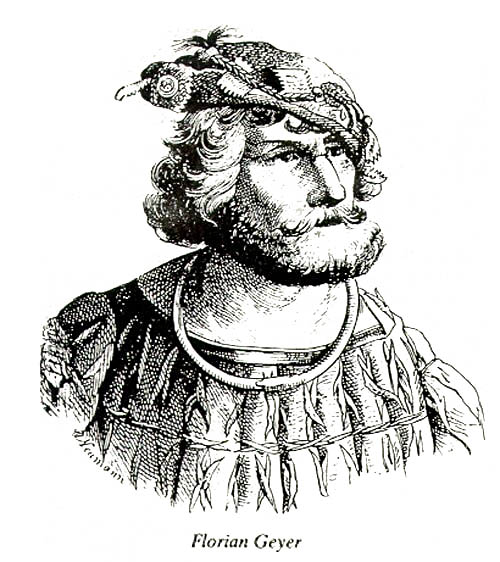
- Known for: Leading the Black Company during the German Peasants' War
- Born: c. 1490; Giebelstadt
- Died: 10 June 1525 (aged 34–35); Würzburg

Florian Geyer von Giebelstadt (also spelled Geier; c. 1490 – 10 June 1525) was a German nobleman, diplomat, and knight. He became widely known for leading peasants during the German Peasants' War.

== Early life ==
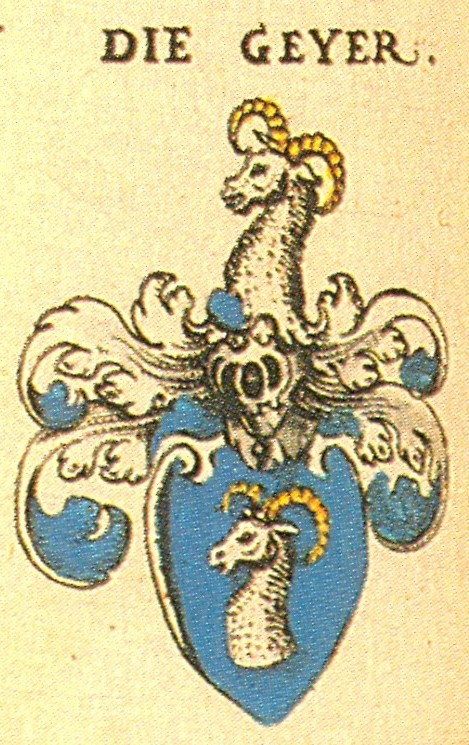
The arms of the Geyer family: a ram's head

Florian Geyer was born around 1490 at Geyer Castle in Giebelstadt, Lower Franconia. After the deaths of his father Dietrich (in 1492) and of his two older brothers, Florian Geyer inherited the family castle and fortune. In 1512 and 1513, he was a guest at the court of King Henry VIII in England, where he may have been exposed to the reformist ideas of John Wycliffe and the Lollards. In 1517, after refusing to pay 350-year-old interest claims from Neumünster Collegiate Church, Geyer was excommunicated.

In 1519, Geyer served under Casimir Margrave of Brandeburg-Kulmbach in the army of the Swabian League against Ulrich Duke of Württemberg and Götz von Berlichingen in Möckmühl. Later that year Brandeburg-Kulmbach sent Geyer to his brother Albrecht Duke of Brandenburg-Prussia, then Grand Master of the Teutonic Order, to support him in the Polish-Teutonic War (1519–1521). Geyer negotiated the truce which ended it. He remained in Brandenburg-Prussia's service until 1523, travelling to various European courts on diplomatic missions.

In 1523, Geyer accompanied Martin Luther on a visit to Wittenberg in Brandenburg-Prussia. If not already sympathetic to the Protestant Reformation, Geyer was probably won over to Luther's ideals at this meeting.

== German Peasants' War ==
When the German Peasants' War broke out in 1524, Florian Geyer, together with a handful of low-ranking knights and several hundred hastily trained peasant militiamen, established the Black Company (often called the Black Host or Black Band), which was possibly the only heavy cavalry division in European history to fight on the side of a peasant revolution. By checking Imperial and Protestant knights on the battlefield, the Black Company allowed preacher Thomas Müntzer and his infantry to score a string of victories in Thuringia. Geyer is reputed to have had the words "Nulla crux, nulla corona" (No cross, no crown) scratched on the blade of his sword. All sides credited him with the wanton destruction of cathedrals and castles, and summary executions of the lords and priests contained therein. These destructions played a part in causing Martin Luther to side with the princes, calling on them to slaughter the rebellious peasants.

As the Peasants' War dragged on, many of the rebel peasants returned home, and most of the knights who, alongside Geyer, had joined Müntzer deserted or defected. Müntzer himself was defeated at the Battle of Frankenhausen and executed shortly afterwards.

== Death ==
Conflicting accounts place Geyer with the company, or alone in Rothingen in the aftermath of the Battle of Frankenhausen. The Black Company was falsely informed of victory at Frankenhausen, and ambushed outside of Ingolstadt. They managed to regroup, retreat, and fortify the town's castle and cathedral. The cathedral was burned with no survivors, and the castle was taken after three assaults. A portion of the Black Company broke free, only to be encircled again in nearby woodlands. If Geyer had been leading the Black Company through the Battle of Ingolstadt, he barely escaped with his life. Geyer may, however, have been stranded at Rothingen the entire time while waiting for an escort from the Black Company, which was only to be barred from entering the town. The later attempts to stamp out memory of the uprising have obscured these details.

Whether or not Geyer was at Ingolstadt, he was one of the last survivors. In the night from 9 to 10 June 1525 he was contacted in Würzburg by two servants of his brother-in-law Wilhelm von Grumbach, who had stated their intention of helping him rekindle the Peasants' War. While traveling together, they stabbed Geyer to death in the Gramschatz Forest near Würzburg. The location of his remains is unknown.

== Legacy ==
The family of Florian Geyer died out in the early 18th century and their castle in Giebelstadt passed into other hands, but is still the site of the annual "Florian Geyer Festspiele".

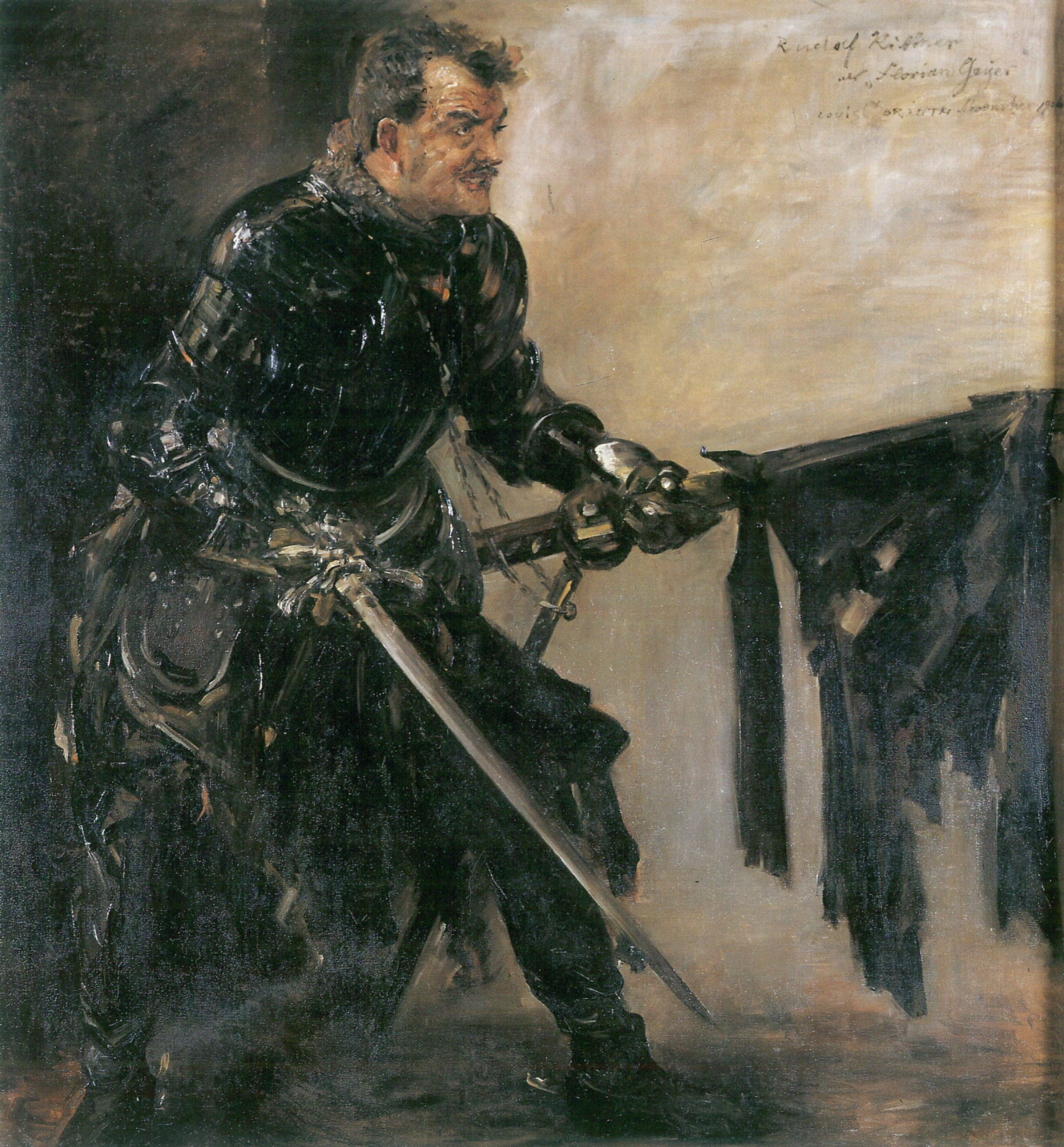
Corinth's painting of Rudolf Rittner as Geyer in Hauptmann’s play.

Geyer was heralded as a communist revolutionary in Friedrich Engels' The Peasant War in Germany (1850). In this work, Engels asserts that the war was primarily a class struggle over control of farms and mines, which subverted the Biblical language and metaphors commonly understood by peasants. In this spirit, a regiment of the Border Troops of the German Democratic Republic, Grenzregiment 3 Florian Geyer, was named after him. Geyer was appropriated as a patriotic figure by Adolf Hitler and the Nazi Party. The 8th SS Cavalry Division Florian Geyer was named after him in March 1944, during World War II.

Geyer was also the hero of one of Gerhart Hauptmann's major plays, the historical drama Florian Geyer (1896), and the inspiration for the German folk song, "Wir sind des Geyers schwarzer Haufen" ("We are Geyer's Black Company"), with a strong anti-clerical and anti-noble theme. The song has been popularised as a union-song, and is noted for its inclusion in the official songbooks of both Nazi Germany and the German Democratic Republic.

== Sources ==
- Hermann Barge: Florian Geyer. Eine biographische Studie. Gerstenberg Verlag, Hildesheim 1972, ISBN 3-8067-0124-5
- Christa Dericum: Des Geyers schwarze Haufen. Florian Geyer und der deutsche Bauernkrieg. Bertelsmann, München 1980, ISBN 3-570-07254-1
- Friedrich Engels: Der deutsche Bauernkrieg. Unrast-Verlag, Münster 2004, ISBN 3-89771-907-X
- Günther Franz: Der deutsche Bauernkrieg. Wissenschaftliche Buchgemeinschaft, Darmstadt 1987, ISBN 3-534-03424-4
- Dagobert von Mikusch: Florian Geyer und der Kampf um das Reich. Schlegel, Berlin 1941.
- Gerhart Hauptmann: Florian Geyer. Die Tragödie des Bauernkrieges. Reclam, Stuttgart 2002, ISBN 3-15-007841-5
- Jeremiah Pearson: Brethren. Book One of the Villeins Trilogy, Incunabula Press 2013, ISBN 978-0989546706.
