= Stühlingen =

- Town
- Coat of arms

- Location of Stühlingen within Waldshut district
- Interactive map of Stühlingen
- Location within Germany Location within Baden-Württemberg
- Coordinates: 47°44′43″N 8°26′45″E
- Country: Germany
- State: Baden-Württemberg
- Admin. region: Freiburg
- District: Waldshut

Government
  - Mayor (2017–25): Joachim Burger

Area
  - Total: 93.2 km^{2} (36.0 sq mi)
- Elevation: 501 m (1,644 ft)

Population (2025-12-31)
  - Total: 5,318
  - Density: 57.1/km^{2} (148/sq mi)
- Time zone: UTC+01:00 (CET)
  - Summer (DST): UTC+02:00 (CEST)
- Postal codes: 79778–79780
- Dialling codes: 07703, 07709, 07743, 07744
- Vehicle registration: WT
- Website: www.stuehlingen.de

Stühlingen (German pronunciation: [ˈʃtyːlɪŋən]; High Alemannic: Stüelinge) is a town in the Waldshut district in Baden-Württemberg, Germany. It is situated on the border with Switzerland, with a border crossing to the village of Oberwiesen in Schleitheim municipality, 15 km northwest of Schaffhausen town.

== Location ==
=== Geographical area ===
Stühlingen is a climatic resort that lies on the Wutach on the southern edge of the Black Forest at an altitude between 449 and 601 metres, directly on the Swiss border near the community of Schleitheim.

=== Neighbouring towns ===
Towns in the neighbourhood of Stühlingen are Schaffhausen (Switzerland), Bonndorf, Blumberg, Stein am Rhein (Switzerland), Waldshut-Tiengen, Singen and Donaueschingen.

=== Town districts ===
The separate communities of Bettmaringen, Blumegg, Eberfingen, Grimmelshofen, Lausheim, Mauchen, Oberwangen, Schwaningen, Unterwangen and Weizen belong to Stühlingen together with 32 further small villages.

The Abandoned villages of Ottwangen and Tandlekofen are in the Bettmaringen area. In the Blumegg district there is the ruined Castle of Blumegg and in front of the castle there are abandoned houses. Near Lausheim there are the remains of an undocumented and unnamed Burg.

== History ==
By Roman times the valley floor in the immediate neighbourhood of Stühlingen had been long settled. In Grimmelshofen graves have been found dating from the late Merovingian period. The foundations of Schloss Hohenlupfen date from this time since they are built on the foundations of a Roman signal Tower.

The year 1262 was significant in that the Count of Lupfen enclosed an oval area on a mountain spur above the Wutach valley. He obtained a town charter and today this is the town of Stühlingen. The town obtained a market charter and was the seat of justice. The oval area formed by the town walls and the Upper Gate is known today as the „Marktplatz“.

During the Swabian War the territory of the Lupfener Counts became the target of the peasants, who conquered and burnt the town in 1499.

In 1524 the Stühlinger peasant insurrection took the overlordship from the Hohenlupfens. There exists a legend, that this insurrection formed the initial spark of the German Peasants' War. It is documented, that the South Baden ring leader Hans Müller von Bulgenbach originated from a hamlet in the vicinity.

From 1615 to 1743 a Jewish community was established in Stühlingen, made up of five main families, the Weils, the Blochs, the Bernheims, the Bickerts and the Guggenheims, from which by 1743 the majority of the households in the County of Stühlingen that became Jewish families came expelled for not renewing the letters of protection, which allowed Jews to live in a certain place for a certain time, for a fee, and were expelled when those letters of protection expired.

In the middle of the 19th century the town gates were demolished.

At the start of the 20th century the law court in Stühlingen was abolished.

During the Third Reich the Stühlingen town charter was repealed under the Deutsche Gemeindeordnung of 1935. At the end of the Second World War it was restored. The granting of the town charter was marked by the planting of a linden tree in the Jewish quarter, the „Stadtlinde“.

In 1960 a swimming pool was opened, and in the 2006 season the „Schwimmfreunde Stühlingen“ association was formed.

In 1962 Stühling celebrated the 700 year anniversary of the granting of the town charter in 1262.

On 1 January 1975 Stühlingen increased in size from approx. 1800 to over 5000 inhabitants through boundary changes in Baden-Württemberg. At the same time Stühlingen increased its area to 9300 Hectares.

On 26 March 2007 the construction of an old peoples home with sheltered accommodation was begun. This was expected to be completed at the beginning of 2008. In July the ground breaking ceremony for the Centenary Lower Town Project took place, for this the community had obtained credit in millions.

== Town twinnings ==
- Belleme France since 1980.
