= Black Company =

Combatants in the 1520s German Peasants' Revolt

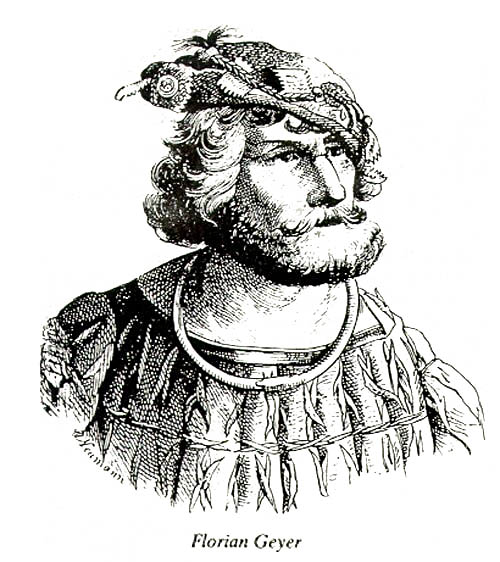
Stitch ostensibly portraying Black Company leader Florian Geyer

The Black Company or the Black Troops (German: Schwarze Haufen) was a unit of Franconian farmers and knights that fought on the side of the peasants during the Peasants' Revolt in the 1520s, during the Protestant Reformation in Germany.

== Name ==
The original German name of the Black Company was Schwarzer Haufen. The term Schwarz (black) pointed out the ideological distance of the company from the large peasant army at that time, which called itself the Heller Haufen (Hell meaning "light-colored"). The German word Haufen was the name the peasants gave to their armed companies.

It was never used again for an army, possibly because the word Haufen means "heap" in German and was used to refer to loosely organised armed rabbles.

== Formation ==
The Black Company was formed in 1525 in Rothenburg, out of local, home guard farmers - maybe 600 men - and a company of mercenary knights.

The leader of the Black Company, at least nominally, was nobleman Florian Geyer.

Geyer managed to shape the Black Company into something like a company of real soldiers, instead of just an armed mob. Some of the knights were probably his vassals.

== History ==
After the Company took over the area around Rothenburg, it proceeded to Swabia to destroy fortified monasteries and castles and prevent their becoming strongholds of the Swabian League. Those who didn't attack the Black Company were left unharmed during these actions. But in Schweinsberg, Swabia, another company, led by peasant leader Jaecklein Rohrbach, executed about 50 local knights after they had opened fire on two negotiators. Geyer disapproved of this slaughtering and moved his troops back to Franconia to continue the fight. But Rohrbach's action had sealed the fate of captured peasants and of Geyer's men. From that time on, Georg, Truchsess ("Steward") of Waldburg, commander of the Swabian League, showed little mercy to the Black Company and hunted them down ruthlessly throughout Swabia. Rohrbach himself was chained to an apple tree and burned alive when he was captured in May, 1525.

In the Battle of Ingolstadt, in May 1525, the Black Company found itself alone against the forces of the Swabian League after its allies had been destroyed. The Black Company fought its way back to Ingolstadt and occupied the ruins of the castle, the main buildings of which the members of the Company had themselves burned down some months before. The troops of the League encircled the castle and started their attack. The castle's occupants fought off two assaults but during the third attack, and after the League's heavy artillery breached the massive walls, they were killed.

Geyer himself wasn't there during the last battle. He waited for an escort in Rothenburg, but was banned from the city before it arrived. Geyer traveled North and was robbed and killed by two servants of his brother-in-law Wilhelm von Grumbach in the night of June 9–10 in the forest near Rimpar.

== Legacy ==
The Black Company has remained very popular to the present day, although Swabian rulers did everything to nullify its fame in the years after the uprising, through publishing a number of "facts" about the crimes the peasants supposedly had committed.

The actions of the Black Company has been memorialised in the song "Wir sind des Geyers schwarzer Haufen", a World War I-era composition by Fritz Sotke with lyrics from Heinrich von Reder. The song has a strong anti-clerical and anti-noble theme, and it remains popular in modern day Germany, with contemporary bands offering different performances and reinterpretations of the lyrics.

== See also ==
- Peasants' Revolt, England, 1381
- Popular revolt in late-medieval Europe
- List of peasant revolts
