= Wir sind des Geyers schwarzer Haufen =

World War I era German marching song

Song
- Language: German
- English title: lit. 'We Are Geyer's Black Bunch'
- Written: 1920
- Genre: German folk music
- Songwriter: Heinrich von Reder
- Composer: Fritz Sotke

Wir sind des Geyers schwarzer Haufen (lit. 'We Are Geyer's Black Bunch') is an interwar-era German marching song. The lyrics of the song are sourced from the poem Ich bin der arme Konrad, written by the Bavarian poet and artillery officer Heinrich von Reder in 1888. The melody of the song was arranged by German songwriter Fritz Sotke in 1919. As a song about the German Peasants' War, its lyrics are noted for their strong anti-clerical and anti-noble themes.

== History ==
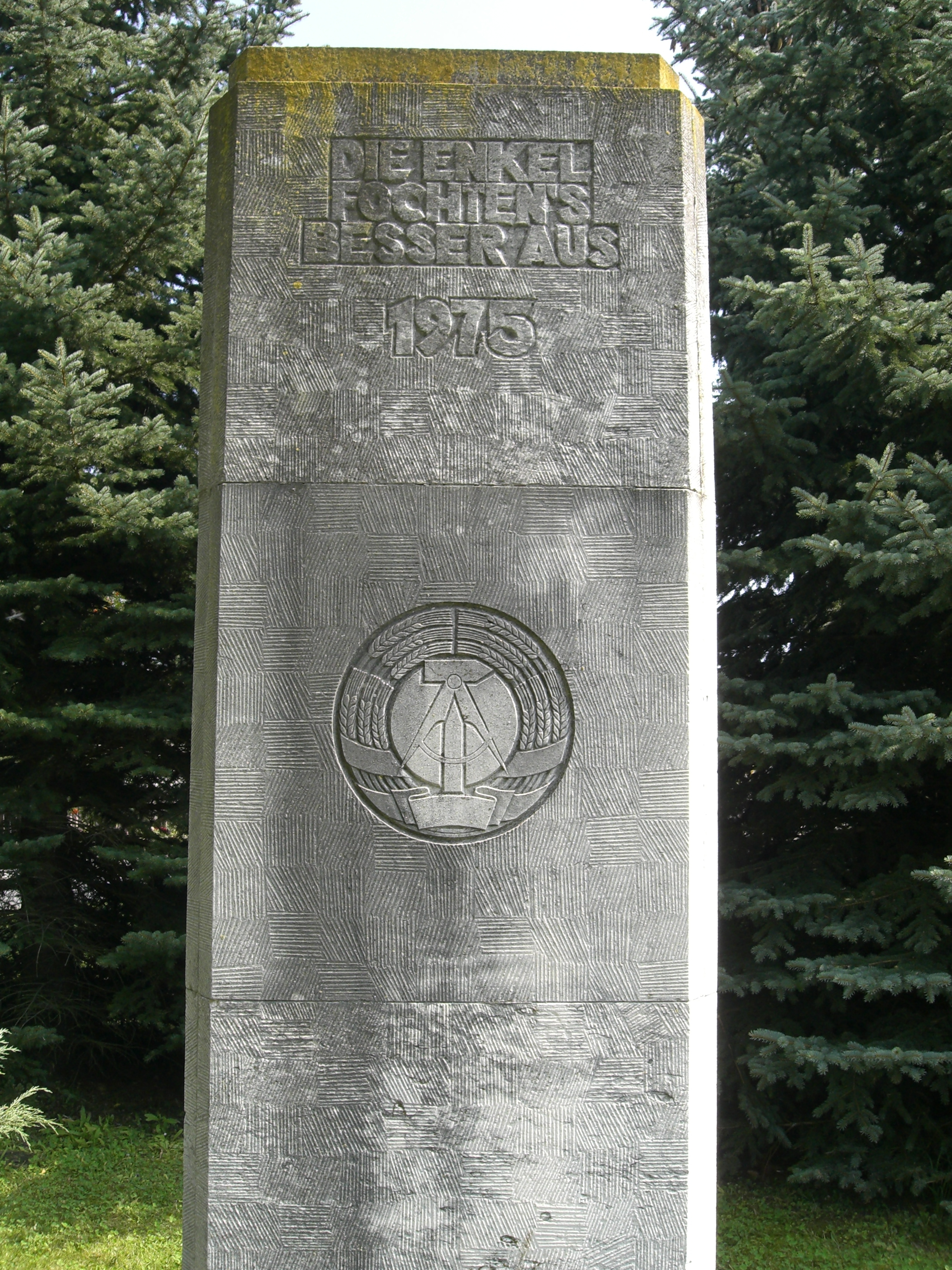
Socialist combined memorial for the 1525 German Peasants' War and the 1945 German Land Reform in Osterhausen, Saxony-Anhalt. The inscription "Die Enkel fochten's besser aus" refers to this song.

The song's title (translates "We are Geyer's Black Bunch") and lyrics are references to Florian Geyer (1490 – 10 June 1525) and his Black Company, a heavy cavalry unit which fought on the side of the Peasants during the German Peasants' War. Geyer's Black Company was notorious with his contemporaries for their destruction of cathedrals, castles, and summary executions of clerics and noblemen. The song's lyrics capitalize on this notoriety, with references to the actions of the Black Company: "Setzt aufs Klosterdach den Roten Hahn!" ("Raise the red rooster [flames] upon the cloister roof!").

As a song composed within the broader context of the Weimar Republic-era German Youth Movements, the song was sung by many different political groups across the political spectrum. The song is notable for its inclusion in the official songbook of the National People's Army of the German Democratic Republic.

In the modern-day, Wir sind des Geyers schwarzer Haufen remains a popular song performed by various German music groups. Depending on the specific arrangement and performer, the lyrics of the song may be altered or weakened. Common substitutions include replacing the "cloister roof" with a simple "knight's roof", or even omitting certain lines entirely (e.g. "Des Edelmannes Töchterlein, heia hoho, soll heute uns’re Buhle sein").

Notably, the antepenultimate line of the song's final stanza ("Unsre Enkel fechten's besser aus") is inscribed on a memorial commemorating the 1525 German Peasants' War and the 1945 German Land Reform, in Osterhausen near Eisleben, Saxony-Anhalt. The oath "our grandchildren will fight a better fight" was seemingly fulfilled generations later, in the eyes of the memorial's designers.

== Lyrics and translation ==
Note that depending on the specific performer and arrangement, there may be differences in the lyrics.

Lyrics
German

Wir sind des Geyers schwarzer Haufen,
Hei a ho ho!
Und wollen mit Tyrannen raufen,
Hei a ho ho!
Spieß voran, drauf und dran,
Setzt aufs Klosterdach den roten Hahn!

Wir wolln's dem Herrn im Himmel klagen
Kyrieleis!
daß wir die Pfaffen nicht dürfen totschlagen
Kyrieleis!
Spieß voran, drauf und dran,
Setzt aufs Klosterdach den roten Hahn!

Als Adam grub und Eva spann,
Kyrieleis!
Wo war denn da der Edelmann?
Kyrieleis!
Spieß voran, drauf und dran,
Setzt aufs Klosterdach den roten Hahn!

Jetzt geht's auf Schloß, Abtei und Stift,
Heia hoho!
uns gilt nichts als die Heilge Schrift,
Heia hoho!
Spieß voran, drauf und dran,
Setzt aufs Klosterdach den roten Hahn!

Uns führt der Florian Geyer an,
Trotz Acht und Bann!
Den Bundschuh führt er in der Fahn,
Hat Helm und Harnisch an!
Spieß voran, drauf und dran,
Setzt aufs Klosterdach den roten Hahn!

Bei Weinsberg setzt' es Brand und Stank,
Heia hoho!
Gar mancher über die Klinge sprang,
Heia hoho!
Spieß voran, drauf und dran,
Setzt aufs Klosterdach den roten Hahn!

Des Edelmannes Töchterlein,
Kyrieleis!
Wir jagen sind die Höll hinein,
Kyrieleis!
Spieß voran, drauf und dran,
Setzt aufs Klosterdach den roten Hahn!

Geschlagen ziehen wir nach Haus,
Heia hoho!
Unsre Enkel fechten's besser aus,
Heia hoho!
Spieß voran, drauf und dran,
Setzt aufs Klosterdach den roten Hahn!

English translation

We are the Geyer's Black Host,
Hiya ho ho!
And we want to scuffle with tyrants
Hiya ho ho!
Spears advance! Forward march!
Raise the red flames (Note: Literally: "the red rooster".) upon the cloister roof!

We want to complain to God in Heaven
Lord, have mercy!
That we can't beat the priests to death,
Lord, have mercy!
Spears advance! Forward march!
Raise the red flames upon the cloister roof!

When Adam plowed and Eve spun,
Lord, have mercy!
Where was then the nobleman?
Lord, have mercy!
Spears advance! Forward march!
Raise the red flames upon the cloister roof!

Now we're 'gainst the castle, abbey, and church,
Hiya ho ho!
We keep no vows but the Holy Script
Hiya ho ho!
Spears advance! Forward march!
Raise the red flames upon the cloister roof!

We're led by Florian Geyer,
Despite denounce and ban
The Bundschuh he carries upon his flag
Wears helmets and armor!
Spears advance! Forward march!
Raise the red flames upon the cloister roof!

By Weinsberg we gave 'em fire and stench,
Hiya ho ho!
Many a man was put to the blade,
Hiya ho ho!
Spears advance! forward march!
Raise the red flames upon the cloister roof!

The nobleman's little daughter,
Lord have mercy!
We'll send her straight back to hell,
Lord have mercy!
Spears advance! Forward march!
Raise the red flames upon the cloister roof!

Beaten, we drag ourselves back home
Hiya ho ho!
Our grandchildren will fight a better fight
Hiya ho ho!
Spears advance! Forward march,
Raise the red flames upon the cloister roof!

Bill Berry sung a shorter version in English:

Troops of Geyer clad in black are we
Heia o-ho
And we will stamp out tyranny
Heia o-ho

Chorus
Spearmen ho! Forward go!
On the castle roof let the Red Cock crow
Spearmen ho! Forward go!
On the castle roof let the Red Cock crow

When Adam dug and Eve did toil
Heia o-ho
No princes trespassed on their soil
Heia o-ho

Bold Geyer's men their arrows shoot
The knights are laid low
His banner bears a peasant's boot
To stamp out the foe

The noble's only God is pride
Heia o-ho
The Holy Scripture is our guide
Heia o-ho

We're beaten though our cause is right
Heia o-ho
Our sons will carry on the fight
Heia o-ho
