= Schleitheim =

- Municipality
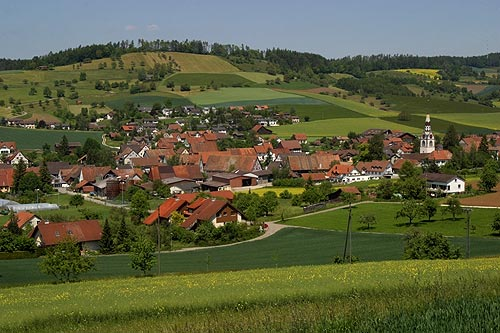

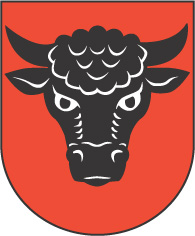
- Coat of arms
- Location of Schleitheim
- Location within Switzerland Location within Canton of Schaffhausen
- Coordinates: 47°45′N 8°27′E
- Country: Switzerland
- Canton: Schaffhausen
- District: n.a.

Government
  - Mayor: Willi Fischer

Area
  - Total: 21.63 km^{2} (8.35 sq mi)
- Elevation: 480 m (1,570 ft)

Population (December 2008)
  - Total: 1,663
  - Density: 76.88/km^{2} (199.1/sq mi)
- Time zone: UTC+01:00 (CET)
  - Summer (DST): UTC+02:00 (CEST)
- Postal code: 8226
- SFOS number: 2952
- ISO 3166 code: CH-SH
- Surrounded by: Beggingen, Blumberg (DE-BW), Gächlingen, Hemmental, Oberhallau, Siblingen, Stühlingen (DE-BW)
- Website: www.schleitheim.ch

Schleitheim is a municipality in the canton of Schaffhausen in Switzerland, located directly on the border with Germany.

It is known as the location where the seven articles of the Schleitheim Confession were written.

== Geography ==
Aerial view (1965)

Schleitheim has an area, as of 2006, of 21.5 km^{2} (8.3 sq mi). Of this area, 58.6% is used for agricultural purposes, while 34.9% is forested. Of the rest of the land, 6.2% is settled (buildings or roads) and the remainder (0.3%) is non-productive (rivers or lakes).

== History ==
The area of today's Schleitheim was already settled in Roman times. A vicus at that time bore the name Iuliomagus. In 995 the German name is attested for the first time as Sleitheim. This name stems from Old High German sleit (English: 'gently sloping, inclined') and Old High German heim (English: 'house, residence'), meaning "settlement on a gentle slope on the inclined plain."

Schleitheim gained historical significance as the birthplace of the Schleitheim Confession of 1527, the oldest creed of Anabaptism, written under the direction of Michael Sattler.

In 1530 the villages Schleitheim and Beggingen became part of the territory of the city of Schaffhausen, in exchange for Grafenhausen and Birkendorf which became part of the landgraviate Stühlingen.

== Coat of arms ==
The blazon of the municipal coat of arms is Gules, an ox head sable lined white.

== Demographics ==
Schleitheim has a population (as of 2008) of 1,663, of which 12.0% are foreign nationals. Of the foreign population, (as of 2008), 45.3% are from Germany, 10.3% are from Italy, 2% are from Croatia, 25.6% are from Serbia, 1.5% are from Macedonia, and 15.3% are from another country. Over the last 10 years the population has decreased at a rate of -4.4%. Most of the population (as of 2000) speaks German (93.9%), with Albanian being second most common ( 2.5%) and Italian being third ( 1.1%).

The age distribution of the population (as of 2008) is children and teenagers (0–19 years old) make up 21.5% of the population, while adults (20–64 years old) make up 55.6% and seniors (over 64 years old) make up 22.9%.

In the 2007 federal election the most popular party was the SVP which received 50.9% of the vote. The next two most popular parties were the FDP (25.3%), and the SP (23.8%) .

In Schleitheim about 74.9% of the population (between age 25–64) have completed either non-mandatory upper secondary education or additional higher education (either university or a Fachhochschule). In Schleitheim, as of 2007, 1.66% of the population attend kindergarten or another pre-school, 8.26% attend a Primary School, 4.22% attend a lower level Secondary School, and 6.96% attend a higher level Secondary School.

As of 2000, 69.4% of the population belonged to the Swiss Reformed Church and 13.3% belonged to the Roman Catholic Church.

The historical population between 1850 and 2008 is given in the following table:

== Economy ==
Schleitheim has an unemployment rate, as of 2007, of 0.88%. As of 2005, there were 117 people employed in the primary economic sector and about 46 businesses involved in this sector. 221 people are employed in the secondary sector and there are 20 businesses in this sector. 373 people are employed in the tertiary sector, with 65 businesses in this sector.

As of 2008 the mid year average unemployment rate was 1.1%. There were 85 non-agrarian businesses in the municipality and 44.1% of the (non-agrarian) population was involved in the secondary sector of the economy while 55.9% were involved in the third. At the same time, 69.5% of the working population was employed full-time, and 30.5% was employed part-time. There were 630 residents of the municipality who were employed in some capacity, of which females made up 38.3% of the workforce. As of 2000 there were 395 residents who worked in the municipality, while 394 residents worked outside Schleitheim and 188 people commuted into the municipality for work.

As of 2008, there are seven restaurants, and two hotels with 28 beds. The hospitality industry in Schleitheim employs 23 people.

== Transport ==
A border crossing into Germany is located at the village of Oberwiesen. The town over the border is Stühlingen in Baden-Württemberg. Schleitheim has a regular Postbus service to and from Schaffhausen railway station.

== Heritage sites of national significance ==
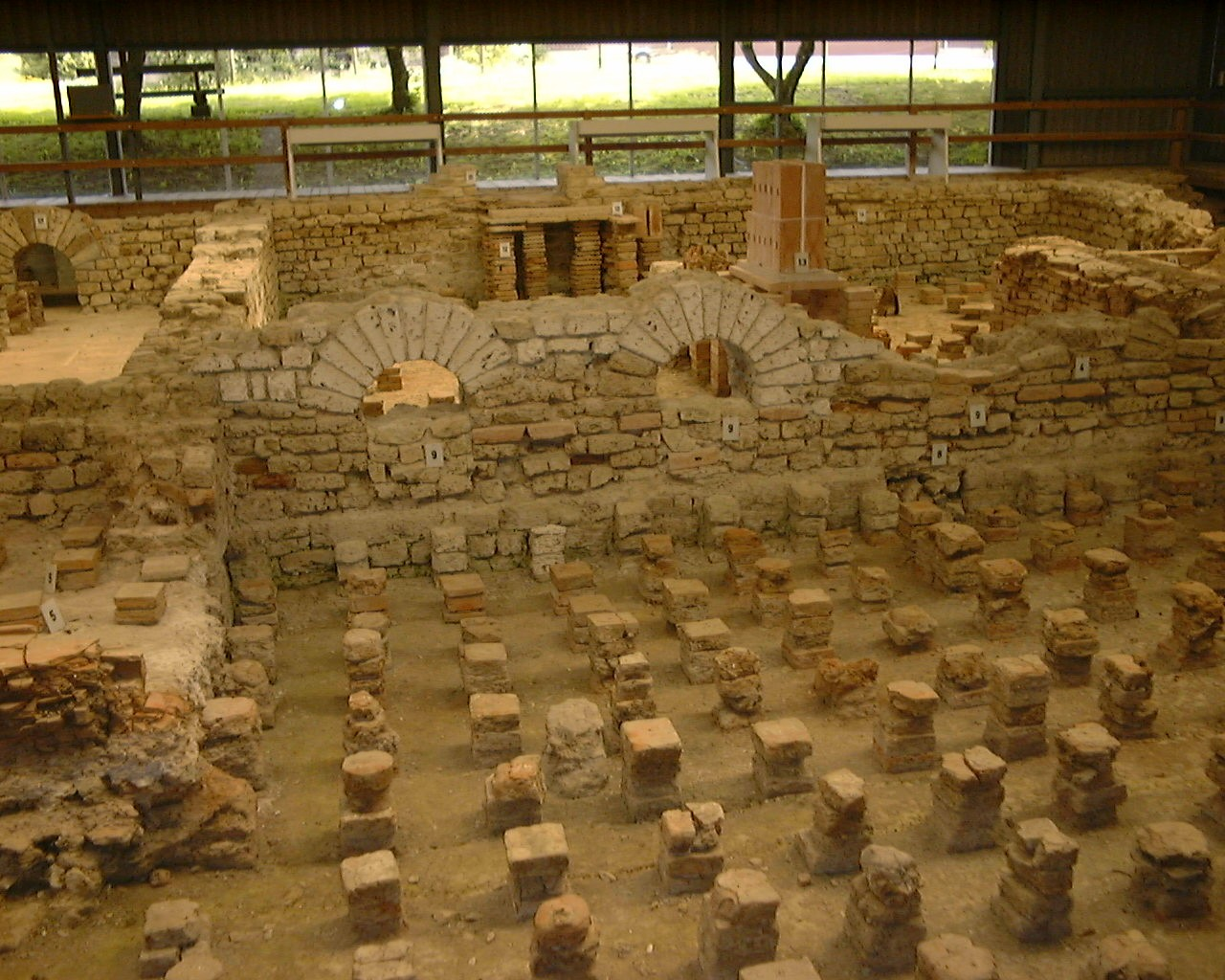
Bath house for the village of Juliomagus

The Early Middle Ages graveyard at Hebsack, the Roman vicus of Juliomagus and the Roman estate at Vorholz are listed as Swiss heritage sites of national significance.

== Climate ==
Schleitheim has an average of 121.6 days of rain or snow per year and on average receives 878 mm (34.6 in) of precipitation. The wettest month is August during which time Schleitheim receives an average of 95 mm (3.7 in) of rain or snow. During this month there is precipitation for an average of 11 days. The month with the most days of precipitation is June, with an average of 11.6, but with only 93 mm (3.7 in) of precipitation. The driest month of the year is September with an average of 57 mm (2.2 in) of precipitation over 11 days.
