= Schloss Gutenberg =

Castle in Austria

Coordinates: 47°12′44″N 15°34′06″E

- Styria, Austria
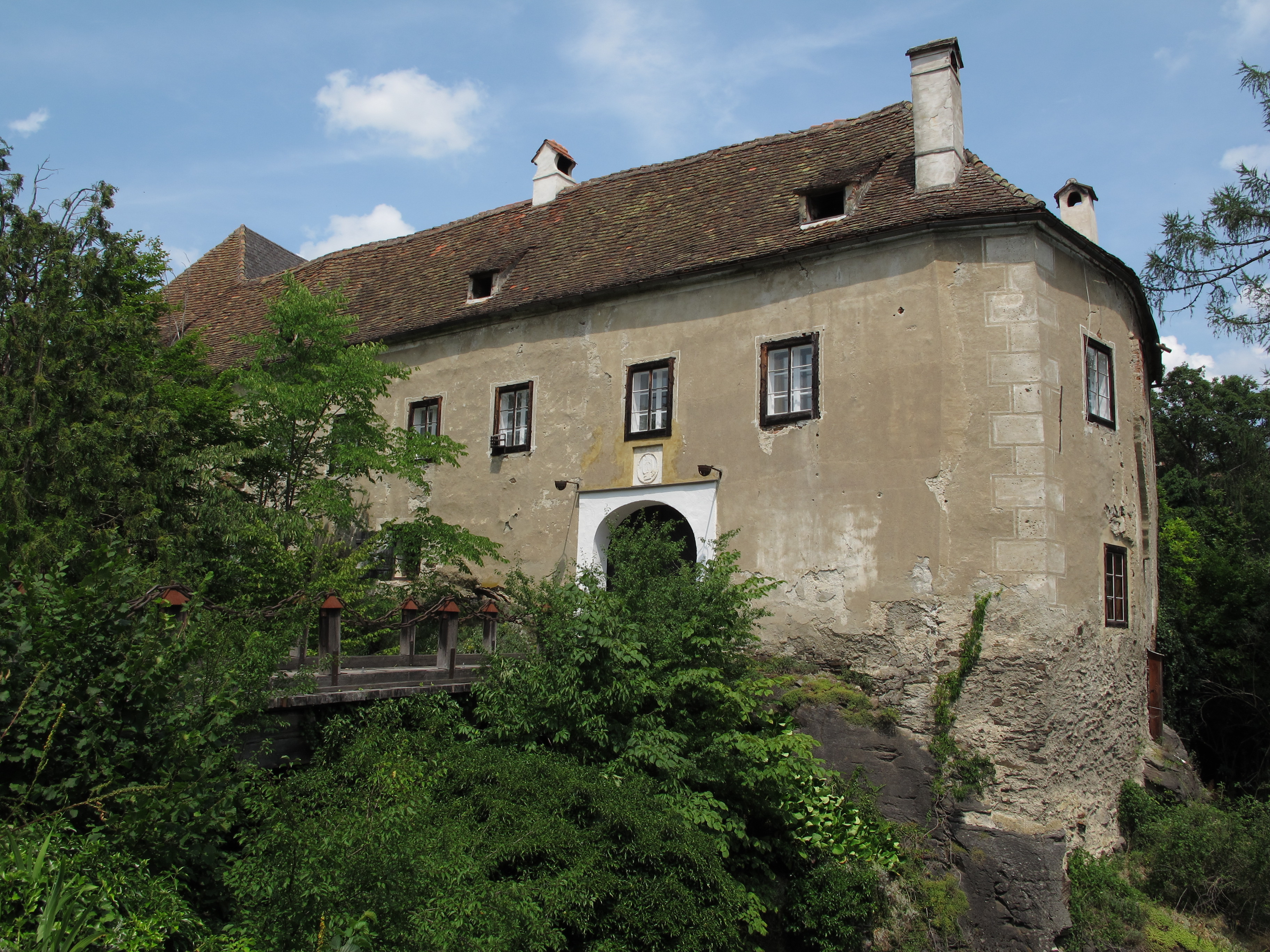

Site information
- Type: Castle

Schloss Gutenberg is a castle in Styria, Austria. Schloss Gutenberg is situated at a height of 567 meters.

Schloss Gutenberg stands on a prominent rock by the Raabklamm in Gutenberg an der Raabklamm parish.

The castle is a foundation of Luitold III of Waldstein, who moved into the castle in 1185. The castle has belonged to the Stubenberg family since 1288. The oldest section from the 12th century was supplemented by a 2-story bailey that is protected by two moats. The outer moat is bridged today, the inner was filled in. The castle was remodeled and expanded, mixing the medieval style with Renaissance elements. An irregular four-story building complex with an almost pentagonal footprint and similarly pentagonal courtyard. The rustic gate faces south.

== Schlosskapelle St. Pankras ==
The southwest corner with the Chapel of Saint Pancras constitutes the oldest section of the castle. The chapel, originally constructed over three stories like a tower, with galleries in both upper stories, was dedicated in 1365. Entry is on the first gallery with frescoes that were isolated by the later addition of a dome. The frescoes from the second half of the 14th century show St. Alfa, St. James the Elder, the Martyrs of Ten Thousand, St. George, and the Caravan of the Three Kings. The Romanesque window behind the altar now has modern glass.

== Farm Buildings ==
The farm buildings bear the dates 1659 and 1710.

== Street Chapels ==
A chapel from about 1721 stands on the access road. The second chapel is from the third quarter of the 18th century. Two stone figures, St. Anna and St. John Nepomuk, originally from Schloss Wieden at Kapfenberg, also stand along the access road. Both are by Veit Königer, from about 1770.

== See also ==
- List of castles in Austria
