= List of bishops of Constance =

The bishop of Constance (German: Konstanz) was the spiritual head of the Diocese of Constance in the Catholic Church and, between 1155 and 1803, the secular ruler of the Prince-Bishopric of Constance within the Holy Roman Empire.

== Bishops of Vindonissa ==
- 1. Bubulcus (515-534)
- 2. Cromatius (534-552)
- 3. Ursinus I (550-580)

== Bishops of Constance ==
- 4. Maximus (first bishop of the re-established bishopric, fl. 590)
- 5. Ruodelo (c. 583 - c. 589)
- 6 Ursinus II. (c. 589 - c. 600)
- 7 Gaudentius 606 613
- 8 Johannes I. (615 - 629/639?)
- 9 Martianus (629 - 639)
- 10 Othardus (mid 7th century)
- 11 Pictavus (mid 7th century)
- 12 Severius (mid 7th century)
- 13 Astropius (mid 7th century)
- 14 Johann II. (?) (mid 7th century)
- 15 Boso (2nd half of the 7th century)
- 16 Gandolphus (2nd half of the 7th century)
- 17 Fidelis (2nd half of the 7th century)
- 18 Theobaldus (?) (2nd half of the 7th century)
- 19. Audoin (until his death in 736)
- 20. Arnefried (736-746)
- 21. Sidonius (746-760)
- 22. John II (760–782)
- 23. Egino (782-811)
- 24. Wolfleoz (811-838)
- 25. Solomon I (838–871)
- 26. Gebhard I von Wetterau, von Tegerfelden (873–875)
- 27. Solomon II (875–889)
- 28. Solomon III (890–919)
- 29. Noting of Constance (919-934)
- 30. Conrad I (935–975)
- 32. Gaminolf (975–979)
- 33. St Gebhard (979–995)
- 34. Lambert (995–1018)
- 35. Rudhart (1018–1022)
- 36. Heimo (1022–1026)
- 37. Warmann (Warmund) von Dillingen (1026–1034)
- 38. Eberhard von Kyburg-Dillingen (1034–1046)
- 39. Theoderich (1047–1051)
- 40. Rumold von Bonstetten (1051–1069)
- 41. Karl (Karlmann) (1070–1071)
- 42. Otto von Lierheim (1071–1080)
- 43. Bertolf (1080–1084)
- 44. Gebhard III (1084–1110; papal candidate) / Arnold von Heiligenberg (1092-1112; imperial candidate)
- 45. Ulrich I von Dillingen (1111–1127)
- 46. Ulrich von Castell (1111–1138)
- 47. Hermann von Arbon (1138–1165)
- 48. Otto von Habsburg (1165–1174)
- 49. Berthold von Bußnang (1174–1183)
- 50. Hermann von Friedingen (1183–1189)
- 51. Diethelm von Krenkingen (1190–1206)
- 52. Wernher von Staufen (1206–1209)
- 53. Konrad von Tegerfelden (1209–1233)
- 54. Heinrich von Tanne (1233–1248)
- 55. Eberhard II von Waldburd-Thann (1248–1274)
- 56. Rudolf von Habsburg-Laufenburg (1274–1293)
- 57. Friedrich I. von Zollern (1293)
- 58. Henrich von Klingenberg (1293–1306)
- 59. Gerhard von Bevar (1307–1318)
- 60. Rudolf von Montfort (1322–1334)
- 61. Nikolaus von Kentzingen or von Frauenfeld (1334–1344)
- 62. Ulrich Pfefferhardt (1345–1351)
- 63. Joahnn Windlock or von Windek (1352–1356)
- 64. Heinrich von Brandis (1357–1383)
- 65. Mangold von Brandis (1384-1385; Avignon pope's candidate) / Nikolaus von Riesenburg (1384-1387; Rome pope's candidate)
- 66. Heinrich von Bayler (1387-1388; Avignon pope's candidate) / Burkard I. von Hewen (1387-1398; administrator until 1388; Rome pope's candidate)
- 67. Friedrich II. von Nellenburg (1398; Rome pope's candidate)
- 68. Marquard von Randeck (1398–1406)
- 69. Albrecht Blarer (1407-1410)
- 70. Otto III of Hachberg (1410–1434)
- 71. Friedrich von Zollern (1434–1436)
- 72. Heinrich von Hewen (1436–1462)
- 73. Burkhard von Randegg (1463–1466)
- 74. Hermann von Breitenladenburg (1466–1474)
- 75. Ludwig von Freiburg (1474–1479)
- 76. Otto von Sonnenberg (1480–1491)
- 77. Thomas Berlower (1491–1496)
- 78. Hugo von Hohenlandenberg (1496–1529; 1531/2)
- 79. Balthasar Merklin (1530–1531)
- 80. Johann von Lupfen (1532–1537)
- 81. Johann von Weeze (1537–1548)
- 82. Christoph Metzler (1549–1561)
- 83. Mark Sittich von Hohenems (1561–1589)
- 84. Andrew of Austria (1589–1600)
- 85. Johann Georg von Hallwyl (1601–1604)
- 86. Jakob Fugger (1604–1626)
- 87. Werner von Praßberg (1626–1627)
- 88. Johann von Waldburg (1627–1644)
- 89. Franz Johann von Vogt von Altensumerau und Prasberg (1645–1689)

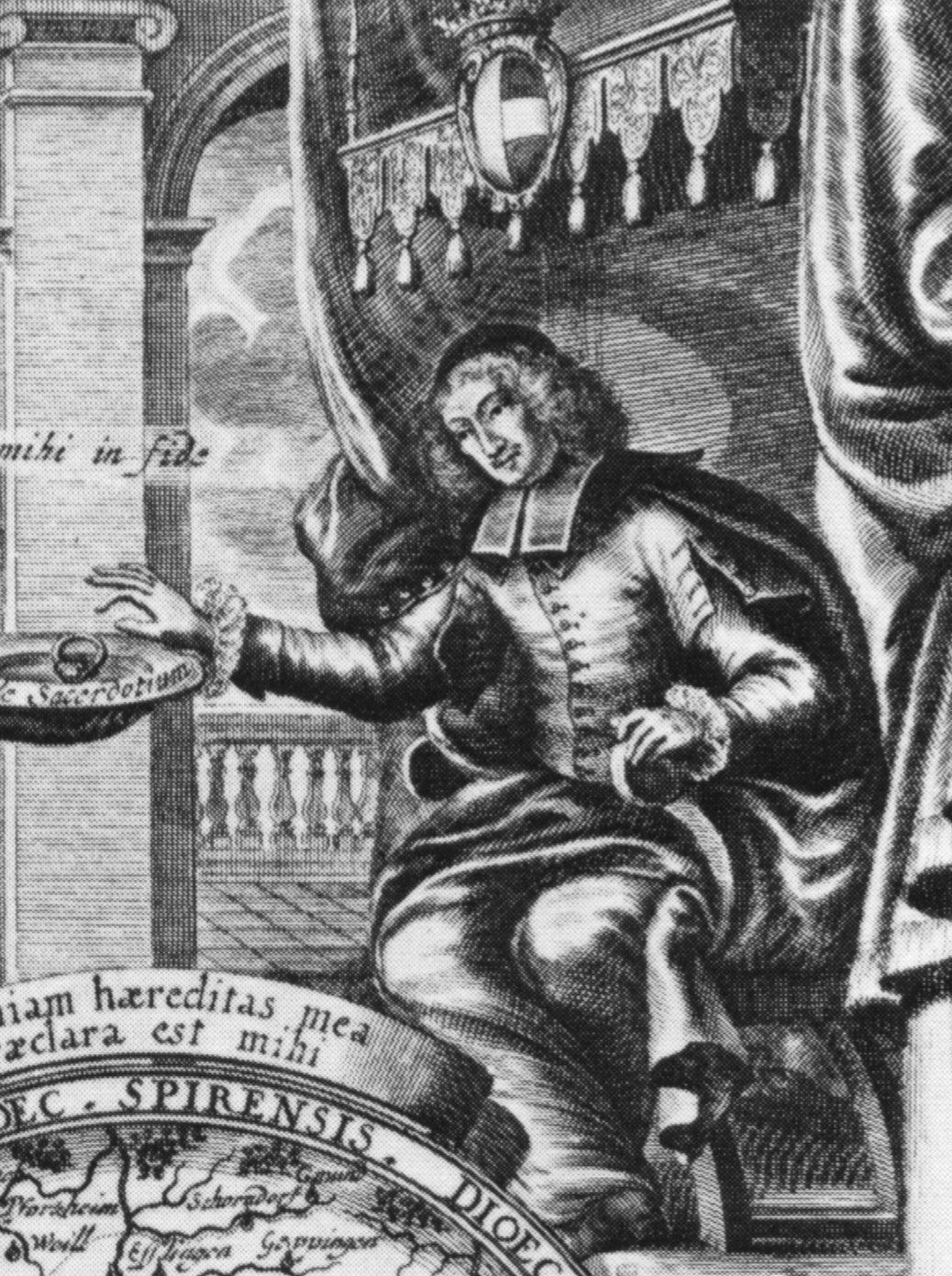
Prince-Bishop Marquard Rudolf von Rodt (1689–1704)

- 90. Marquard Rudolf von Rodt (1689–1704)
- 91. Johann Franz Schenk von Stauffenberg (1704–1740)
- 92. Hugo Damian von Schönborn (1740–1743)
- 93. Kasimir Anton von Sickingen (1743–1750)
- 94. Franz Konrad von Rodt (1750–1775)
- 95. Maximilian Christof von Rodt (1775–1799)
- 96. Karl Theodor von Dahlberg (1799–1817)
- (97.) Ignaz Heinrich von Wessenberg, elected in 1817 but never recognised by Pius VII; in 1821 the bishopric was dissolved.

== Auxiliary bishops ==
- Jean (1430–1440)
- Johann von Blatten, O.F.M. (1441–1461)
- Thomas Weldner, O.F.M. (1461–1470)
- Caspar (1470–1481)
- Burchard Tuberflug, O.P. (1471–)
- Daniel Zehender, O.F.M. (1473–1500)
- Balthasar Brennwald, O.P. (1500–1517)
- Johann Spyser (1518)
- Melchior Fattlin (1518–1548)
- Jakob Eliner (1551–1574)
- Balthasar Wurer (1574–1598)
- Johann Jakob Mirgel (1598–1629)
- Johann Anton Tritt von Wilderen (1619–1639)
- Franz Johann von Vogt von Altensumerau und Prasberg (1641–1645) Appointed, Bishop of Konstanz
- Georg Sigismund Müller (1654–1686)
- Johannes Wolfgang von Bodman (1686–1691)
- Konrad Ferdinand Geist von Wildegg (1693–1722)
- Johann Franz Anton von Sirgenstein (1722–1739)
- Franz Karl Joseph von Fugger-Glött (1739–1768)
- Johann Nepomuk Augustin von Hornstein zu Hohenstoffen (1768–1779)
- Wilhelm Joseph Leopold Willibald von Baden (1779–1798)
- Ernst Maria Ferdinand von Bissingen-Nieppenburg (1801–1813)
