= Maximus (bishop of Constance) =

German bishop

Maximus was the first Bishop of Constance at the end of the 6th century. The bishopric was founded c. 585-590 through Pope Gregory I to evangelise the Alemanni. This was a re-foundation of the Bishopric of Vindonissa or Windisch-Konstanz previously held by Bubulcus, Cromatius and Ursinus.

Preceded by Ursinus	Bishop of Constance from c. 585	Succeeded by Ruodelo
