= Johann von Waldburg-Wolfegg =

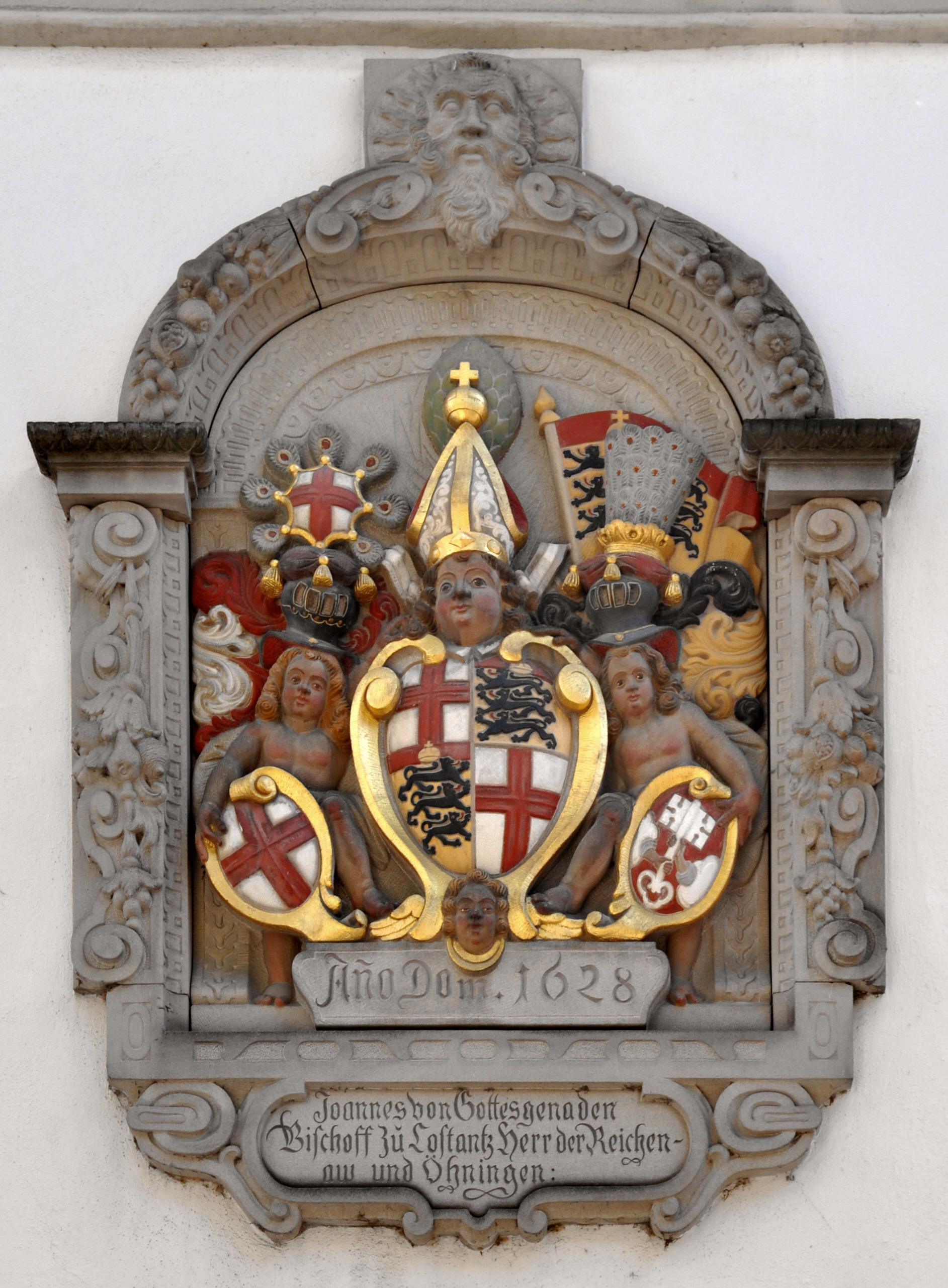
His coat of arms on a house on the Steigstraße in Meersburg

Johann von Waldburg-Wolfegg (26 March 1598 - 13 or 15 December 1644) was abbot of Reichenau Abbey and from 1628 Prince-Bishop of Constance. He was also known as Johann von Waldburg zu Wolfegg or Johann(es) Constanz Graf Truchseß von Waldburg-Wolfegg.

== Family ==
He was the third son of Heinrich Erbtruchseß von Waldburg, Count zu Wolfegg (1568–1637) and Maria Jakoba Countess of Hohenzollern-Sigmaringen (1577–1650). The couple had six other children, including Johann's younger brother Maximilian Willibald, an imperial general. On 27 September 1628 Ferdinand II, Holy Roman Emperor promoted the family to the rank of imperial counts.

== Life ==
In 1614 he became a canon in Cologne and from 1616 to 1629 also held a canonry at St. Gereon's in that city.

On 23 December 1627 he was made Bishop of Constance despite not yet being a priest. On 28 June 1628 he was ordained priest and the same year he also became abbot of Reichenau. He was finally consecrated a bishop on 4 February 1629 by Johann Jakob Mirgel, auxiliary bishop in Constance and titular bishop of Sebaste in Cilicia.

Right at the beginning of his episcopate, in 1629, due to the implementation of the Council of Trent's decrees, a concordat (privilegium fori) was agreed with Leopold of Austria, regent of Tyrol and Lower Austria. It was modelled on the 1620 'Rezess' between Austria and Basel.

As late as 1644 the Cologne Cathedral chapter appointed him chorbishop. He is buried in Constance Minster.

Preceded by Sixt Werner Vogt von Altensumerau und Prasberg	Bishop of Constance; 1628–1644	Succeeded by Franz Johann Vogt von Altensumerau und Prasberg
