= Christoph Metzler (bishop) =

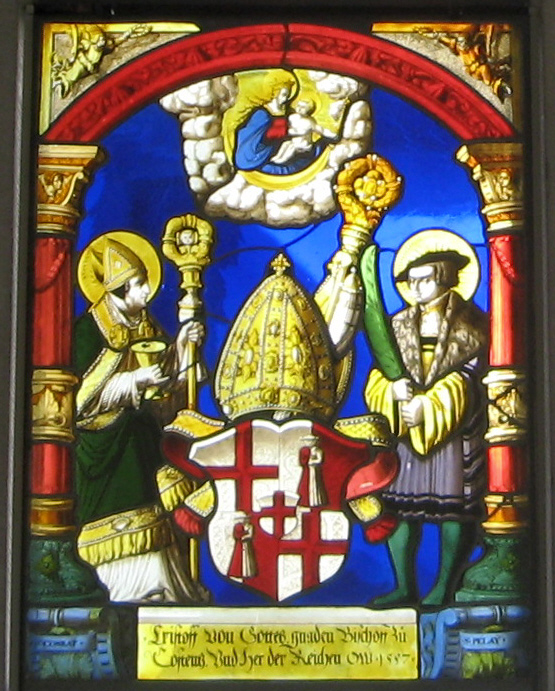
His coat of arms in Muri Abbey.

Christoph Metzler von Andelberg (1490 – 11 September 1561) was Bishop of Konstanz from 1548 until his death.

He was also lord of 'Reichenau' and commissioner in the case of Brandenburg versus Franconian unification. In 1555–1556 he was the imperial sequester of the Margraviate of Brandenburg-Kulmbach.

== Family ==
He was born in Feldkirch as son of the town's mayor Johannes Metzler. His sister Margaretha married the mayor of Chur Johannes Carl von Hohenbalken, whilst his brother was Bartholomäus Metzler, a canon of Konstanz and Chur, from 1589 onwards cantor of Konstanz Cathedral, and from 1576 to 1601 provost of St Stephan's church in Konstanz.

== Life ==
From 1504 to 1506 he and Bartholomäus Bernhardi studied at the newly founded Leucorea in Wittenberg. In 1507 Metzler moved to the Albertina in Freiburg im Breisgau and on 9 December 1518 graduated as a doctor of theology, canon law and secular law from the University of Bologna. He then became vicar general to the Bishopric of Chur and head of the cathedral school. In 1527 he became regent of the cathedral foundation.

After a riot forced him to flee Chur, he became official and vicar general to the Diocese of Konstanz in troubled times. After uprisings and a plague first seen in Überlingen, the cathedral chapter fled to Radolfzell under auxiliary bishop Melchior Fattlin. After the Battle of Mühlberg in 1547, Konstanz continued to resist and so was taken by force by Charles V, Holy Roman Emperor.

After the unexpected death of bishop Johannes von Weeze at the Diet of Augsburg, Metzler was named his successor in Radolfzell on 2 July 1548. Pope Paul III confirmed the nomination on 1 October the same year and he was consecrated bishop in Augsburg by cardinal Otto von Waldburg. He took part in the second session of the Council of Trent, at which he was a well-respected speaker.

He is thought to have commissioned the frescoes in the choir of the church of St. Maria und Markus on the Reichenau. He was editor of the 'Obsequiale, Simul ac Benedictionale, iuxta ritum [e]t normam Ecclesiae [e]t Episcopatus Constantiensis', a liturgical work on the Konstanz Rite published in 1560 in Ingolstadt by the brothers Alexander and Samuel Weißenhorn.

In 1560 the cathedral chapter, Swiss Confederation and the nobility of the bishopric successfully resisted an attempt by Mark Sittich to make himself coadjutor alongside Metzler. Von Hohenems was made a cardinal on 26 February the following year and with support from Ferdinand I and Sittich's uncle Pope Pius IV made a second successful attempt to be appointed to that post.

Christoph Metzler died in the old episcopal residence at Burg Meersburg in 1561 and was succeeded by Sittich as full bishop. Metzler was buried in the choir of the Catholic parish church there. His remains and those of Franz Konrad Kardinal von Rodt, Maximilian Christoph von Rodt, Hugo von Hohenlandenberg and Johann Georg von Hallwyl were moved to the crypt vault near the entrance when that parish church was rebuilt in 1827–1829.

Catholic Church titles
Preceded by Johan Weze	Bishop of Constance; 1548–1561	Succeeded by Mark Sittich
