= Franz Friedrich von Sturmfeder =

Bishop of Augsburg from 1812 to 1818

- Bishop of Augsburg
- Diocese: Augsburg
- In office: 1812 – 1818
- Predecessor: Clemens Wenceslaus of Saxony
- Successor: Franz Karl Joseph Fürst von Hohenlohe-Waldenburg-Schillingsfürst

Personal details
- Born: 11 December 1758 Mannheim
- Died: 26 February 1828 (aged 69) Augsburg
- Denomination: Roman Catholic

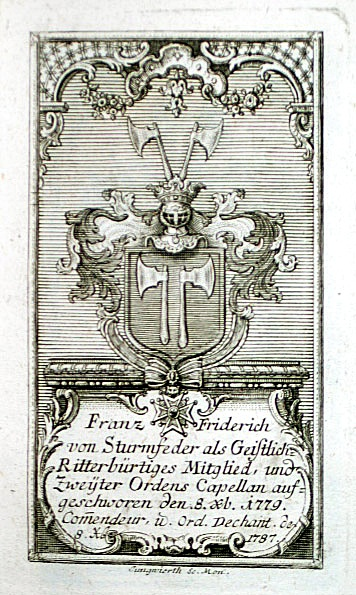
Sturmfeder's coat of arms as a member of the Royal Order of Saint George for the Defense of the Immaculate Conception.

Franz Friedrich von Sturmfeder (11 December 1758, Mannheim – 26 February 1828, Augsburg) was a German Roman Catholic priest. From 1812 to 1818 he was vicar general and diocesan administrator in Augsburg – this covered the period between the fall of the Prince-Bishopric of Augsburg and the formation of the present diocese of Augsburg.

He is also notable as the uncle of Louise von Sturmfeder (1789-1866), tutor to Franz Joseph I of Austria and his brother Maximilian I of Mexico.

== Notes and references ==
- Jahrbuch des Vereins für Augsburger Bistumsgeschichte e. V., Volume 24, p. 47, at Google Books

Catholic Church titles
Preceded by Clemens Wenceslaus of Saxony	Bishop of Augsburg; 1812 – 1818	Succeeded by Franz Karl Joseph Fürst von Hohenlohe-Waldenburg-Schillingsfürst
