= Ursinus (bishop) =

German bishop

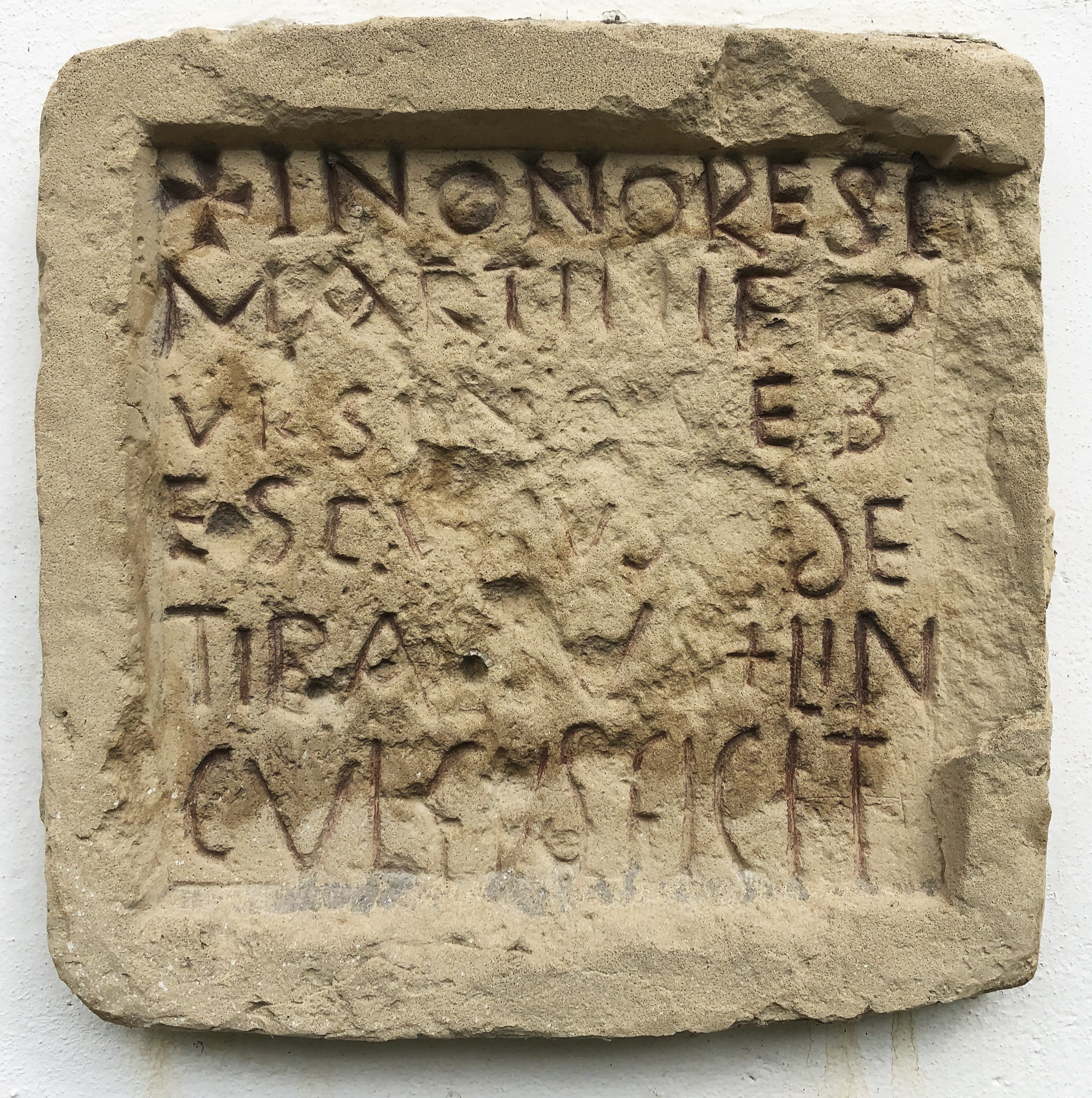
Inscription.

Ursinus (fl. c. 560 and/or 6th-7th centuries) was a bishop of (Windisch)-Konstanz and/or of Constance.

A Ursinus appears as the third entry in the 'Zweifalt Bishops List' of 1143-1144, after Bubulcus and Grammatius.

A Merovingian dedicatory or building inscription in vulgar Latin mentions a bishop called "Ursinos", along with a Detibaldus and a Linculfus - originally on a lost church dedicated to St Martin of Tours, it was built into the outer wall of the former St.-Marienkirche (now the Reformed Church) in Windisch, Switzerland as spolia in the 16th century at the latest. In full it reads:

In onore Sc Martini eep Ursinos ebescubus (it) Detibaldus + Linculfus ficit (Bishop Ursinos, Detibaldus and Linculfus built this church in honour of St. Martin the bishop)

However, according to Franz Xaver Kraus, the inscription refers to another Ursinus attested elsewhere as "Ursinos ebescubus“ or "Ursinus episcopus", who held the Bishopric of Constance from the late 6th to early 7th centuries between Ruodelo and Gaudentius.

Preceded by Cromatius	Bishop of (Windisch-)Constance c. 550–580	Succeeded by Maximus
