= Bishop of Lausanne =

Catholic ecclesial title in Switzerland

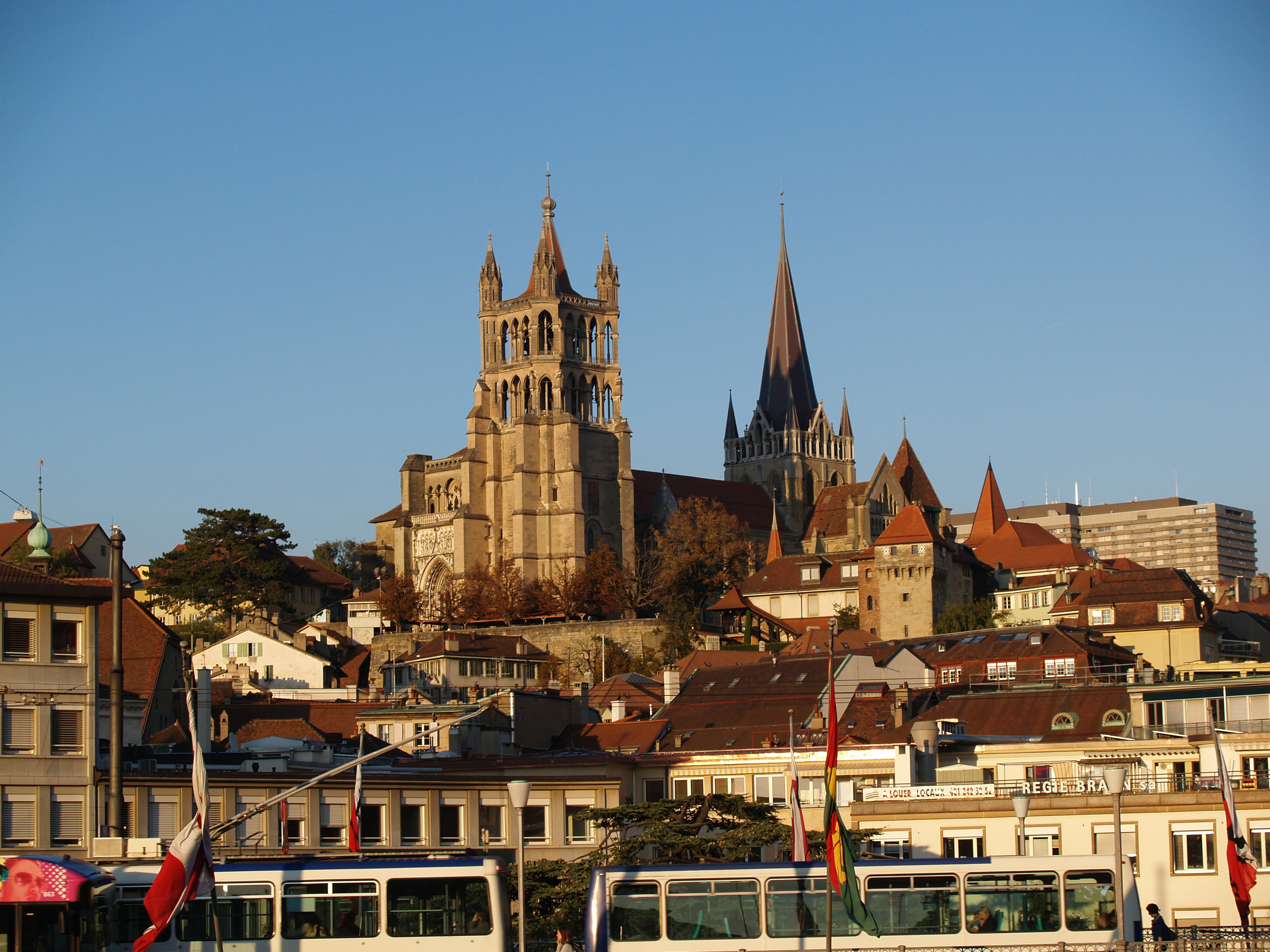
Lausanne Cathedral.

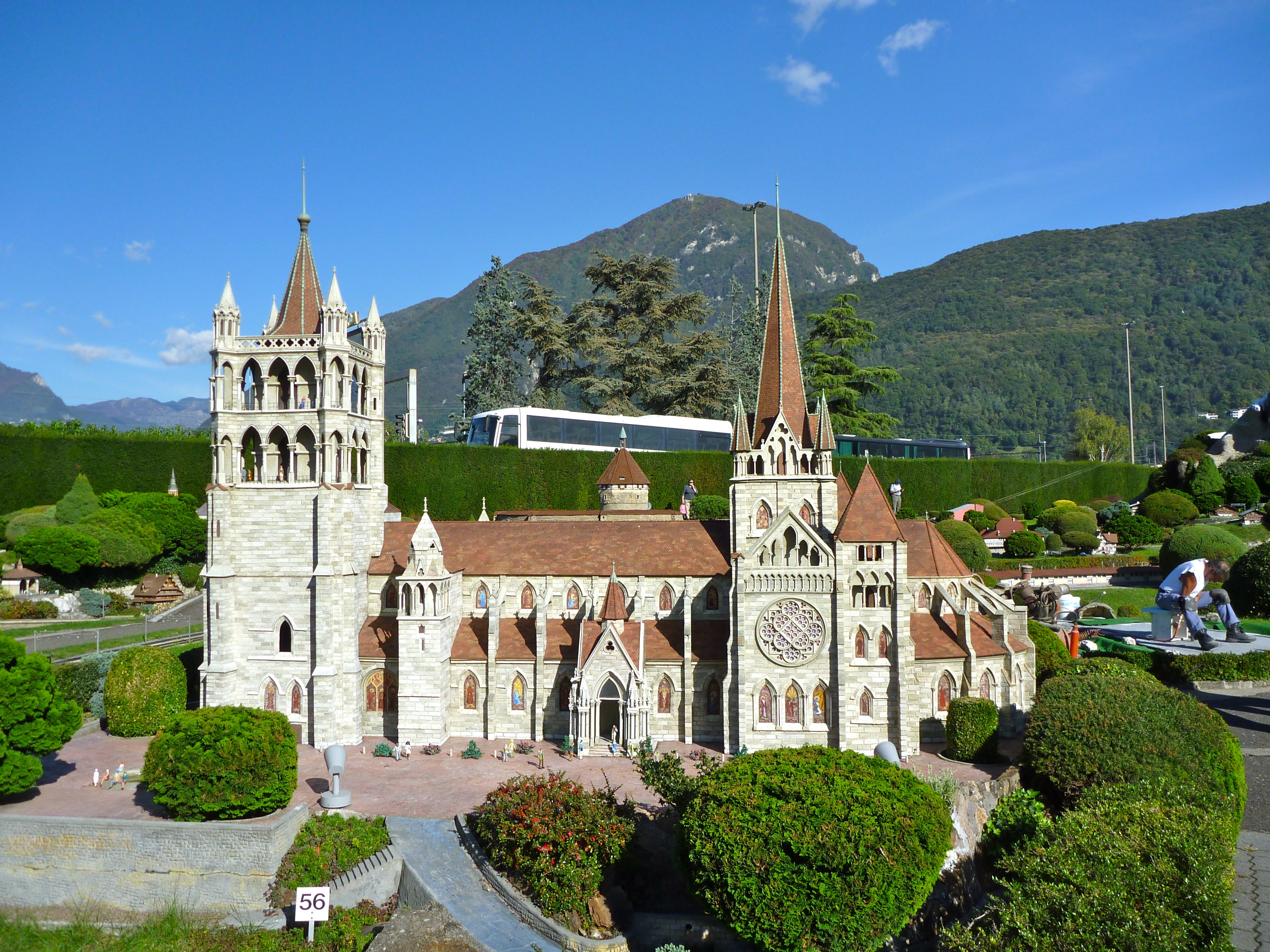
Model of Lausanne Cathedral.

The Bishop of Lausanne (French: Évêque de Lausanne) was the principal ecclesiastical authority of the Catholic Diocese of Lausanne (Latin: Dioecesis Lausannensis).

== History ==
King Rudolphe I of Burgundy granted the Church of Lausanne the privilege of electing its own bishop on 28 January 895.

On 25 August 1011, at the request of Queen Ermengarde, Archbishop Burchard of Lyon (the king's brother), Bishop Hugues of Geneva, and Bishop Anselme of Aosta, the county of Vaud with all its rights and privileges was granted to Bishop Henri of Lausanne and his successors by King Rudolphe III of Burgundy.

It is claimed that the bishops of Lausanne were granted the title of Prince of the Holy Roman Empire in 1270. The deed of grant is published by Jean Joseph Hisely in his work on the comtes de Genevois, but it bears the date 28 September 1273, not 1270. It states that the grant was requested by Pope Gregory X in person, on the very day on which he presided at the consecration of the cathedral of Lausanne. On 28 September 1273, however, Pope Gregory was in Reggio Emiliana, on his way to France for the Second Council of Lyon. The cathedral of Lausanne was consecrated by Gregory X in 1275, not 1273, and on 20 October, not 28 September. The deed of grant has been labelled a forgery.

In the 15th century, the bishops of Lausanne still styled themselves episcopus et comes.

The Sovereign Council of Bern secularized the bishopric in 1536. Bishop Sébastien de Montfalcon fled into exile, first in Évian-les-Bains, and then in Burgundy.

Since 1924, the dioceses have been combined as the Catholic of Fribourg, Lausanne, and Geneva, which has its episcopal seat in Fribourg.

== Bishops ==
=== Bishops of Avenches ===
- Bubulcus (517-535)
- Grammatius (535-549)

=== Bishops of Lausanne 574-1814 ===
==== To 1200 ====
- Marius Aventicensis (574-594)
- Protasius (attested 652)
- Arricus (attested 650)
- ? Chilmegesilus (c. 670 ?)
- Udalricus (690 ?)
- Fredarius (attested 814-825)
- David (827-850)
- Hartmannus (852-878)
- Hieronymus (878-892)
- Boso (892-927)
- Libo (927-932)
- Bero (c. 932-947)
- Magnerius (947-968)
- Eginolfus (968-985)
- Henri of Bourgogne (985-1018)
- Hugh of Burgundy (1018-1037)
- Henri de Lenzbourg (1039-1051/56)
- Burchard de Oltingen (1056-1089)
- Lambert de Grandson (1089-1090)
- Conon de Fenis (1090-1103/07)
- Giroldus or Gerold of Faucigny (1105-1126/34)
- Guy de Maligny or of Marlaniaco (1134-1143)
- Amedeus of Clermont call of Lausanne (1145-1159)
- Landri of Durnes (1160-1177)
- Roger of Vico-Pisano (1178-1212)

==== From 1200 to 1400 ====
- Berthold of Neuchâtel (1212-1220)
- Gérard of Rougemont (1220-1221)
- Guillaume of Ecublens (1221-1229)
- Boniface, O.Cist. (1231-1239)
- Jean of Cossonay (1240-1273)
- Guillaume de Champvent (1273-1301)
- Gérard de Vuippens (1302-1309)
- Othon of Champvent (1309-1312)
- Pierre of Oron (1313-1323)
- Jean de Rossillon (1323-1341)
- Jean de Bertrand (1341-1342)
- Geoffroi de Vayrols (1342-1347)
- François Prévost (1347-1354)
- Aymon de Cossonay (1355-1375)
- Guy de Prangins (1375-1394)

Aymon Séchal administrator (1394)

- Guillaume of Menthonay 1394-1406

==== From 1400 to 1600 ====
- Guillaume of Challant (1406-1431)
- Louis de la Palud (1431-1433)
- Jean de Prangins (1433-1440)
- Georges of Saluces (1440-1461)
- Guillaume de Varax (1462-1466)
- Jean de Michaëlis (1466-1468)

Barthélémy Chuet, administrator (1469-1472)

- Giuliano della Rovere (1472-1476)
- Benoît de Montferrand (1476-1491)
- Aymon de Montfalcon (1491-1517)
- Sébastien de Montfalcon (1517-1536/60)

==== From 1600 to 1814 ====
- Jean de Watteville, O.Cist. (1609-1649)
- Jost Knab 1652-1658
- Henri Fuchs (1658-1662) (apostolic administrator)
- Jean-Baptiste de Strambino, O.Min.Obs. (1662-1684)
- Pierre de Montenbach 1688-1707
- Jacques Duding 1707-1716
- Claude-Antoine Duding 1716-1745
- Joseph-Hubert de Boccard (1746-1758)
- Joseph-Nicolas de Montenach (1758-1782)
- Berndard-Emmanuel de Lenzbourg, O.Cist. (1782-1795)
- Jean-Baptiste d'Odet (1796-1803)
- Joseph-Antoine Guisolan (1804-1814)

=== Bishops of Lausanne and Geneva 1821-1924 ===
- Pierre-Tobie Yenni (1815-1845)
- Etienne Marilley (1846-1879)
- Christophore Cosandey (1879-1882)
- Gaspard Mermillod (1883-1891)
- Joseph Déruaz (1891-1911)
- André-Maurice Bovet (1911-1915)
- Placide Colliard (1915-1920)

=== Bishops of Lausanne, Geneva and Fribourg from 1924 ===
- Marius Besson (1920-1945)
- François Charrière (1945-1970)
- Pierre Mamie (1970-1995)
- Amédée (Antoine-Marie) Grab, O.S.B. (1995-1998)
- Bernard Genoud (1999-2010)
- Charles Morerod, O.P. (2011-Present)

== Bibliography ==
=== Reference works for bishops ===
- Gams, Pius Bonifatius (1873). Series episcoporum Ecclesiae catholicae: quotquot innotuerunt a beato Petro apostolo (in Latin). Ratisbon: Typis et Sumptibus Georgii Josephi Manz. pp. 283-284.
- Eubel, Conradus, ed. (1913). Hierarchia catholica (in Latin). Vol. 1 (Tomus I) (second ed.). Münster: Libreria Regensbergiana.
- Eubel, Conradus, ed. (1914). Hierarchia catholica (in Latin). Vol. 2 (Tomus II) (second ed.). Münster: Libreria Regensbergiana. archived
- Eubel, Conradus; Gulik, Guilelmus, eds. (1923). Hierarchia catholica (in Latin). Vol. 3 (Tomus III) (second ed.). Münster: Libreria Regensbergiana.
- Gauchat, Patritius (Patrice) (1935). Hierarchia catholica. Vol. 4 (Tomus IV) (1592–1667). Münster: Libraria Regensbergiana.
- Ritzler, Remigius; Sefrin, Pirminus (1952). Hierarchia catholica medii et recentis aevi. Vol. 5 (Tomus V) (1667–1730). Patavii: Messagero di S. Antonio.
- Ritzler, Remigius; Sefrin, Pirminus (1958). Hierarchia catholica medii et recentis aevi. Vol. 6 (Tomus VI) (1730–1799). Patavii: Messagero di S. Antonio.
- Ritzler, Remigius; Sefrin, Pirminus (1968). Hierarchia Catholica medii et recentioris aevi (in Latin). Vol. VII (1800–1846). Monasterii: Libreria Regensburgiana.
- Remigius Ritzler; Pirminus Sefrin (1978). Hierarchia catholica Medii et recentioris aevi (in Latin). Vol. VIII (1846–1903). Il Messaggero di S. Antonio.
- Pięta, Zenon (2002). Hierarchia catholica medii et recentioris aevi (in Latin). Vol. IX (1903–1922). Padua: Messagero di San Antonio. ISBN 978-88-250-1000-8.

=== Studies ===
- Aerny, Francis (1991). L'evêché de Lausanne: (VIe siècle-1536); essai de synthèse. (in French). Bière, Switzerland: Cabédita, 1991.
- Besson, Marius (1906). Recherches sur les origines des évêchés de Genève, Lausanne, Sion et leurs premiers titulaires jusqu'au déclin du VIe siècle. (in French) Fribourg: O. Gschwend, 1906.
- Conon d'Estavayer (ed.) (1851). Cartulaire du Chapitre de Notre-Dame de Lausanne. (in French and Latin). Lausanne: G. Bridel 1851. [Mémoires et documents publiés par la Société d'histoire de la Suisse Romande, Vol. VI.]
- Duchesne, Louis (1915). Fastes épiscopaux de l’ancienne Gaule. Tome III. Provinces du Sud-Est. (in French). Paris, Albert Fontemoing 1915. (pp. 219-223)
- Fontaine, Charles-Aloyse (1791). Dissertation historique et critique pour fixer l'époque de l'entrevue du pape Grégoire X & de l'empereur Rodolphe de Habsbourg à Lausanne, pendant laquelle s'est fait le sacre de la cathédrale de cette ville. (in French). Fribourg: chez B. Louis Piller, 1791.
- Hauréau, Barthelemy (1860). Gallia christiana: in provincias ecclesiasticas distributa. (in Latin). Vol. 15. Paris: Firmin Didot, 1860. pp. 323-422; Instrumenta pp. 126-184.
- Gingins-La Serra; Forel, François (edd.). Mémoires et documents publiés par la Société d'histoire de la Suisse romande. (in French and Latin). Volume 7. Lausanne: G. Bridel, 1846.
- Gremaud, Jean (1857). Catalogue chronologique des évêques de Lausanne. (in French). Fribourg: Impr. J.-L. Piller, 1857.
- Lullin, Paul; Le Fort, Charles (edd.) (1866). Régeste genevois: ou, Répertoire chronologique et analytique des documents imprimés relatifs à l'histoire de la ville et du diocèse de Genève avant l'année 1312. (in French and Latin). Genève: Société d'histoire et d'archéologie de Genève 1866. (cf. Index, p. 502)
- Reymond, Maxime (1912). Les dignitaires de l'église Nôtre-Dame de Lausanne jusqu'en 1536, (in French). [Mémoires et documents / Société d'histoire de la Suisse romande Volume 8]. Lausanne: G. Bridel & cie, 1912.
- Santschi, Catherine (1975). Les évêques de Lausanne et leurs historiens des origines au 18e siècle. (in French). Paris: Librairie Droz, 1975.
- Schmitt, Martin (1858). Mémoires historiques sur le Diocèse de Lausanne. Volume 1. (in French). Fribourg: Impr. J.-L. Piller, 1858. Volume 2.
