= Sixt Werner Vogt von Altensumerau und Prasberg =

Bishop of Constance (1575–1627)

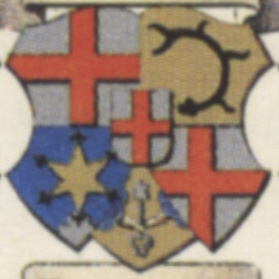
His coat of arms with those of Vogt von Alten-Summerau und Prassberg in two of the fields.

Sixt Werner Vogt von Altensumerau und Prasberg (2 June 1575 – 16 November 1627) was Bishop of Constance from 1626 to 1627.

== Family ==
Sixt Werner came from the Vögte von Altensumerau (von Hallwyl) und Prasberg family, an old family in the sphere of influence of the Hohenems imperial counts and of Mark Sittich von Hohenems Altemps (Bishop of Constance 1561-1589), Johann Rudolf Vogt von Summerau und Prasberg (died 1601 whilst canon in Eichstätt), and Franz Johann Vogt von Altensumerau und Prasberg (Bishop of Constance from 1645 to 1689).

== Life ==
In 1587 he studied at the University of Dillingen and in 1588 became provost of Augsburg Cathedral. und 1589 in Konstanz, 1594 in Eichstätt und 1617 in Salzburg. He later became a deacon at Constance Cathedral before holding its bishopric. and is buried there.

== Bibliography ==
- (in German) Andrea Polonyi: Sixt Werner Vogt von Altensummerau und Praßberg (1575–1627). In: Erwin Gatz (ed.), in collaboration with Clemens Brodkorb: Die Bischöfe des Heiligen Römischen Reiches 1448 bis 1648. Ein biographisches Lexikon. Duncker & Humblot, Berlin 1996, ISBN 3-428-08422-5, S. 726.

Preceded by Jakob Fugger	Bishop of Constance; 1626–1627	Succeeded by Johann von Waldburg
