= Solomon II =

Solomon I or Salomon I may refer to:

- Solomon II (bishop of Constance) (died 889)
- Salomon II of Ethiopia (r. 1777–1779)
- Solomon II of Imereti (r. 1789–1810)
