= Marquard Rudolf von Rodt =

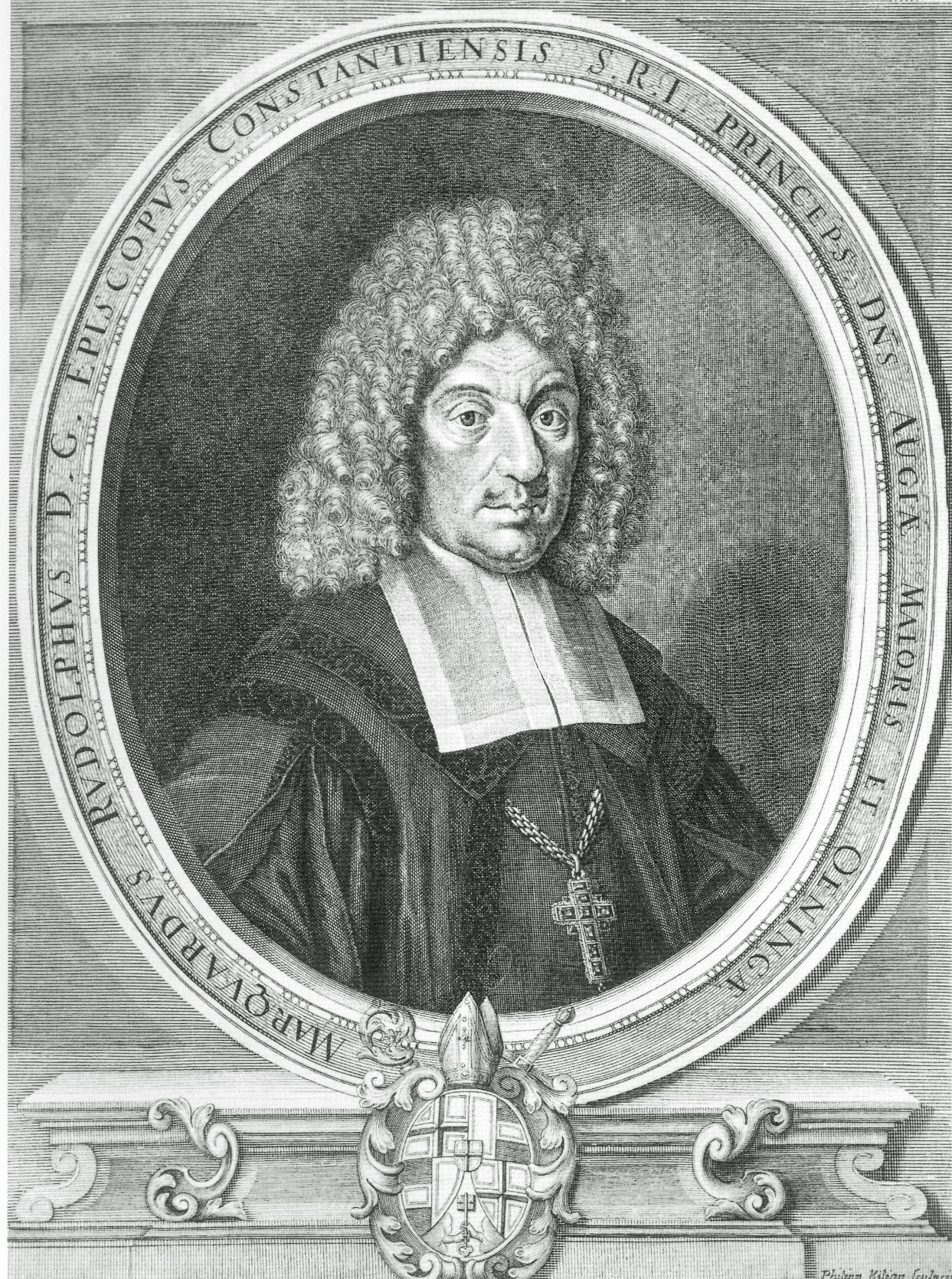
Marquard Rudolf von Rodt

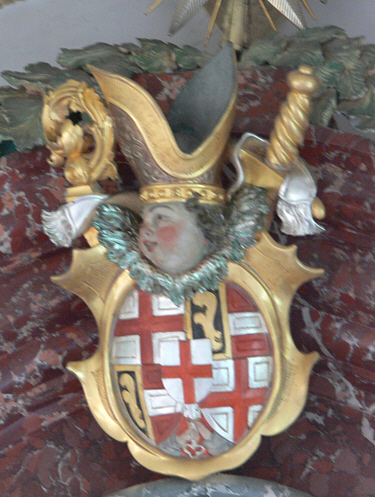
Coat of arms of the prince-bishop at the Wendelinus altar of the church in Baitenhausen

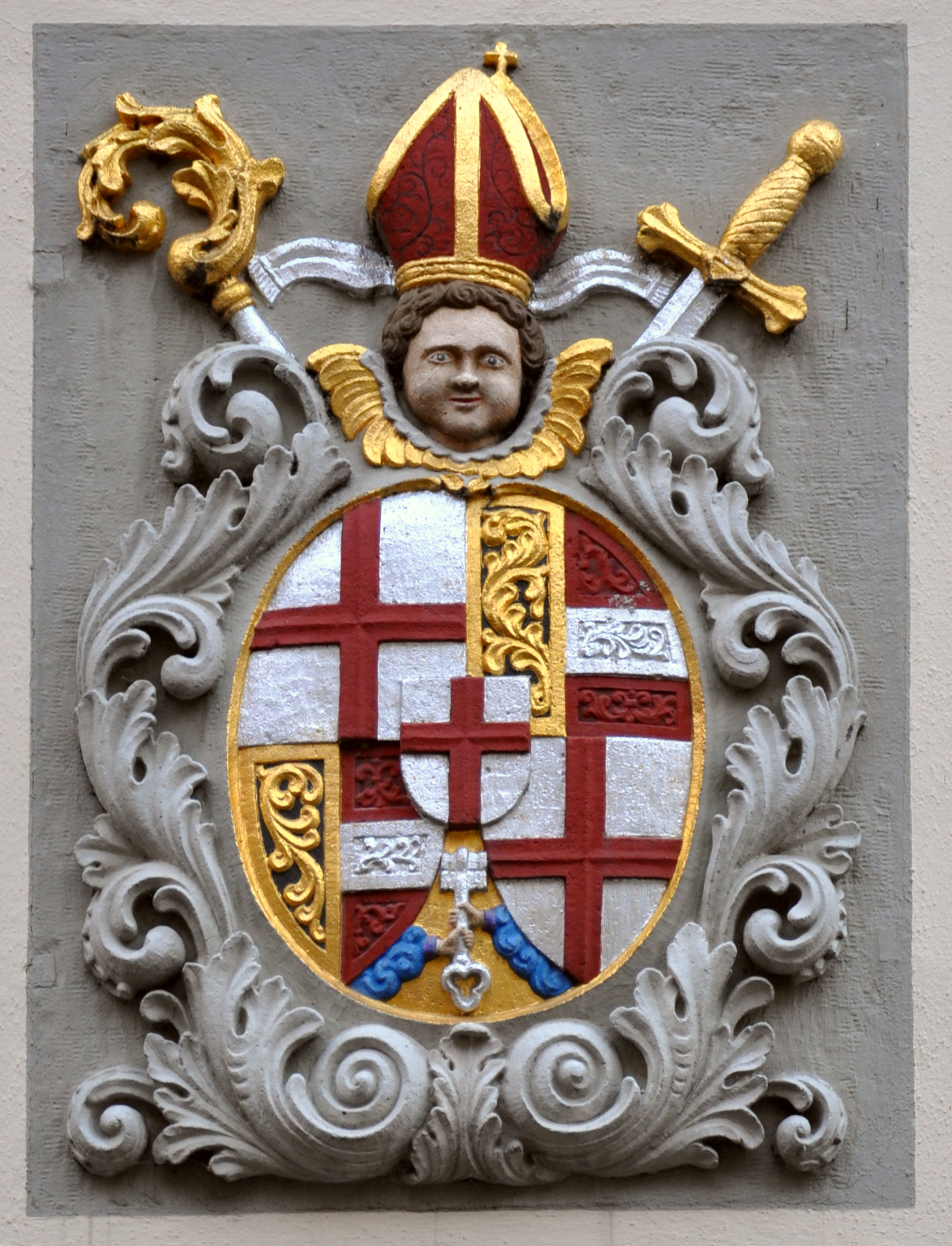
Coat of arms of Marquard Rudolf of Rodt in Meersburg on Lake Constance, "Pfarrhof" at the Schlossplatz

Marquard Rudolf Reichsritter von Rodt zu Bußmannshausen, or Roth (9 April 1644, Konstanz, Holy Roman Empire – 10 July or 6 October 1704, Hegne) was, from 1689 to 1704, the prince-bishop of the Bishopric of Constance.

== Personal life ==
Marquard Rudolf von Rodt came from Upper Swabian knightly nobility of the Freiherren von Rodt zu Bußmannshausen. His father was Johann Dietrich, knight chief and heir of Kempten Abbey; His mother was Maria Barbara von Westerstetten.

He was the first of three members of his family who became Bishops of Constance (preceding Franz Konrad von Rodt and Maximilian Christof von Rodt).

== Biography ==
Marquard Rudolf was recorded in 1653 as an ex-spectant of the Constituency of the Cathedral. He gave his first profession in 1666 and studied at the University of Strasbourg. After becoming sub-deacon and deacon, he was admitted to the chapter of Second Profession. On 26 May 1668, he received the ordination of priest. From 1668 onward, he was a canon in Augsburg and, since 1660, by his episcopal nomination, in Konstanz as well as cantor (1673), archdeacon (1683), and, from 1686, dean at the Konstanz Minster. In 1686 he became president of the clergy council in Constance.

On 14 April 1689, he was elected bishop of Constance in the third round by a narrow majority against the candidate of the Viennese court, Johannes Wolfgang von Bodman, and on 6 March 1690 by Pope Alexander VIII. On 18 June 1690 the Bishop ordained Constance's auxiliary bishop Johannes Wolfgang von Bodman; Consecrated with Augsburger Auxiliary Bishop Johannes Eustache Egolf von Westernach.

In addition to the bishop's office, he was "Lord of the Reichenau (domini Augia maioris) and Öhningen."

His episcopal office was marked by political disputes with France. In addition, the treasury of the imperial court at the Hochstift burdened his work.

Marquard Rudolf died in Hegne Castle and was buried in the cathedral at Constance.

== Literature ==
- Rodt, Marquard Rudolf von in German, French and Italian in the online Historical Dictionary of Switzerland.
- Rudolf Reinhardt (1990). "Marquard Rudolf von Rodt". Neue Deutsche Biographie (in German). Vol. 16. Berlin: Duncker & Humblot. pp. 241–242. (full text online).

Catholic Church titles
Preceded by Franz Johann Vogt von Altensumerau und Prasberg	Bishop of Constance; 1689–1704	Succeeded by Johann Franz Schenk von Stauffenberg
