= Franz Karl Joseph Fürst von Hohenlohe-Waldenburg-Schillingsfürst =

Bishop of Augsburg from 1818 to 1819

Franz Joseph Xaver Karl Fürst von Hohenlohe-Waldenburg-Schillingsfürst
- Bishop of Augsburg
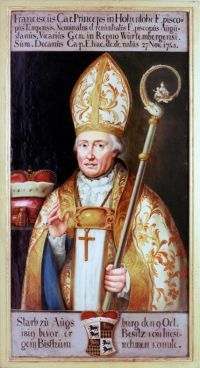
- Portrait of Franz Karl Joseph in the gallery at Augsburg Cathedral
- Diocese: Augsburg
- In office: 5 February 1818 – 9 October 1819
- Predecessor: Franz Friedrich von Sturmfeder
- Successor: Joseph Maria Johann Nepomuk Freiherr von Fraunberg

Personal details
- Born: 27 November 1745 Waldenburg
- Died: 9 October 1819 (aged 73) Augsburg
- Denomination: Roman Catholic

Franz Joseph Xaver Karl Fürst von Hohenlohe-Waldenburg-Schillingsfürst (27 November 1745, Waldenburg – 9 October 1819, Augsburg) was a Roman Catholic auxiliary bishop and bishop of Augsburg (the first after it ceased to be the Prince-Bishopric of Augsburg), as well as vicar general of Neu-Württemberg, later Diocese of Rottenburg.

== Early life and ancestry ==
Born a member of an ancient House of Hohenlohe, he was the son of Prince Karl Albrecht I von Hohenlohe-Waldenburg-Schillingsfürst (22 September 1719 - 25 January 1793) and his first wife, Princess Sophie Wilhelmine von Löwenstein-Wertheim-Rochefort (7 August 1720 - 29 September 1749), the daughter of Dominic Marquard, Prince of Löwenstein-Wertheim-Rochefort.

== Ecclesiastical career ==
Educated by Jesuits, he studied in Parma and Strasbourg and was ordained priest in Cologne on 7 April 1787. He later served as dean of Ellwangen Abbey and a canon in Cologne, Vienna and Strasbourg. Under Clemens Wenceslaus of Saxony, the last Prince-Bishop of Augsburg, Hohenlohe was appointed as an auxiliary bishop in the Augsburg diocese and titular bishop of Tempe, both on 9 August 1802, shortly before it was secularised. He was consecrated as a bishop of 5 September 1802 by Clemens in the Pfarrkirche in Marktoberdorf, with the assistance of the abbots of St. Mang's Abbey and Irsee Abbey.

When the bishop was secularised, it initially remained within its existing borders.

== Bibliography ==
- Frank Raberg - Biographisches Handbuch der württembergischen Landtagsabgeordneten 1815–1933, Im Auftrag der Kommission für geschichtliche Landeskunde in Baden-Württemberg, Kohlhammer Verlag, Stuttgart 2001 ISBN 3-17-016604-2, S. 388.
- Friedrich Lauchert - Hohenlohe-Waldenburg, Franz Prinz zu. In: Allgemeine Deutsche Biographie (ADB), Band 50, Duncker & Humblot, Leipzig 1905, S. 441 f.
- Franz Xaver von Funk - Die katholische Landesuniversität Ellwangen und ihre Verlegung nach Tübingen. In: Festgabe zum Fünfundzwanzigjährigen Regierungsjubiläum seiner Majestät des Königs Karl von Württemberg. In Ehrfurcht dargebracht von der Universität Tübingen. Laupp, Tübingen 1889, getrennte Zählung S. 1–30, hier S. 6–27 (Auch Sonderabdruck).
- Ignaz von Longner - Beiträge zur Geschichte der oberrheinischen Kirchenprovinz, Laupp, Tübingen 1863, S. 362–394.
- Stephan Jakob Neher (ed.), Statistischer Personal-Katalog des Bisthums Rottenburg. Festschrift zum 50-jährigen Jubiläum dieses Bisthums, Schmid, Schwäbisch Gmünd 1878, S. 7.

Catholic Church titles
Preceded by Franz Friedrich von Sturmfeder	Bishop of Augsburg; 1818 – 1819	Succeeded by Joseph Maria Johann Nepomuk Freiherr von Fraunberg
