= Johann Georg von Hallwyl =

German priest-bishop

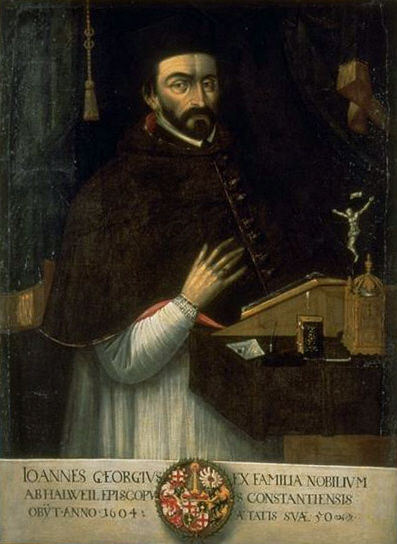
- von Hallwyl Portrait in the Landesmuseum Zürich
- Born: 1555; Bernhausen, Germany
- Died: 11 January 1604 (aged 48–49); Meersburg, Germany
- Cause of death: excessive fasting
- Other names: Johann Georg von Hallwil
- Education: University of Dillingen
- Occupations: priest, bishop
- Known for: prince-bishop of Konstanz
- Notable work: supported Jesuits and their founding a college in Rottweil
- Parents: Dietrich von Hallwyl (father); Eva von Bernhausen (mother)

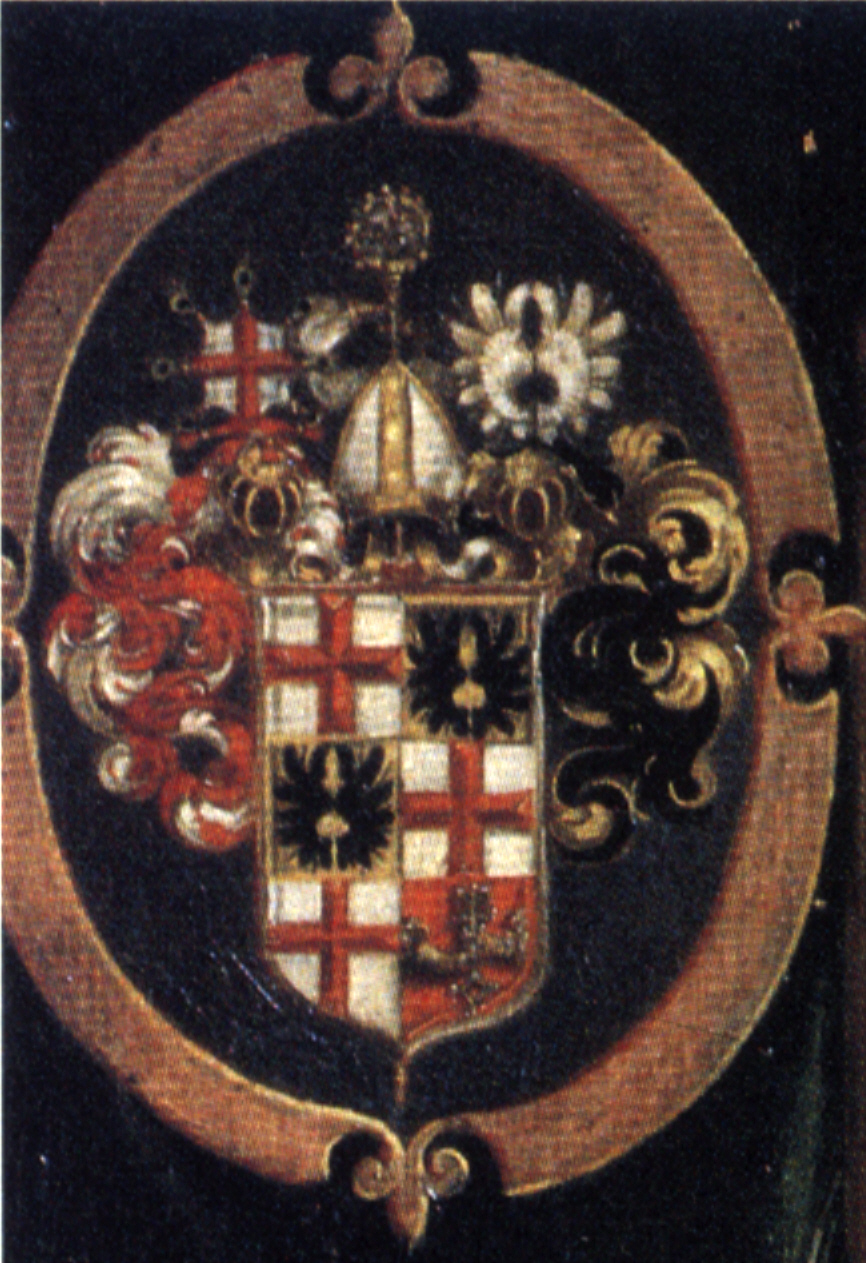
His coat of arms.

Johann Georg von Hallwyl or Hallwil (1555 – 11 January 1604) was prince-bishop of Konstanz from 1601 to 1604.

== Life ==
He was born in Bernhausen to Dietrich von Hallwyl (episcopal bailiff) and Eva von Bernhausen. From 1571 he studied at the Jesuit-run University of Dillingen. With his father's support he received a benefice at the cathedral foundation in Basel. On 14 June 1581 he was ordained a deacon and on 14 August 1583 a priest. On 27 June 1588 he became a member of the cathedral chapter at Konstanz Minster and its dean - the same year he became cantor of Basel Cathedral.

On 2 January 1601 he was appointed Bishop of Konstanz and on 1 June the same year a residential canon. He negotiated with secular rulers regarding the demarcation between their rights and those of the bishop. He republished the Missale Constantiense. He enabled the Jesuit order to settle in Konstanz (his predecessor Andrew of Burgau had already promoted them) and supported their founding a college in Rottweil. His short term as bishop was described as "beneficial" to the monks of Reichenau. However, it was not until his successor Jakob Fugger's time that an agreement was made with Lucerne in 1605.

He died in the episcopal residence in Meersburg of "excessive fasting" (he had been known for his monastic lifestyle). He was buried in the choir of the parish church there. His remains and those of Christoph Metzler and Franz Konrad von Rodt, Maximilian Christoph von Rodt and Hugo von Hohenlandenberg were reburied in the crypt near the entrance of the new parish church built in 1827-1829.

== Bibliography (in German) ==
- Herbert Frey: 'Hallwyl, Johann Georg von.' In: Historisches Lexikon der Schweiz.
- Werner Kundert: Die Aufnahme von Schweizern ins Domkapitel Konstanz 1526–1821. Ein Beitrag zu Recht und Geschichte der Reichskirche. In: Zeitschrift für schweizerische Kirchengeschichte (= Revue d’histoire ecclésiastique suisse). Bd. 68 (1974), insbesondere S. 293 (doi:10.5169/seals-129661).
