= Joseph of Hesse-Darmstadt =

Prince-Bishop of Augsburg from 1740 to 1768

Joseph Ignaz Philipp of Hesse-Darmstadt
- Prince-Bishop of Augsburg
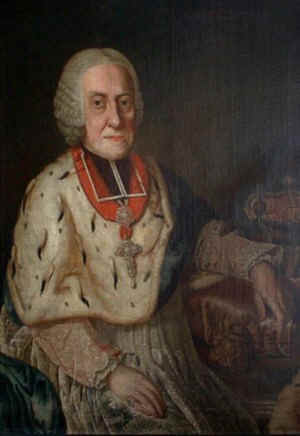
- Portrait by unknown, mid-18th century
- Diocese: Augsburg
- In office: 18 August 1740 – 20 August 1768
- Predecessor: Johann Franz Schenk von Stauffenberg
- Successor: Clemens Wenceslaus of Saxony

Personal details
- Born: 22 January 1699 Brussels
- Died: 20 August 1768 (aged 69) Plombières-les-Bains
- Denomination: Roman Catholic

Joseph Ignaz Philipp of Hesse-Darmstadt (22 January 1699 – 20 August 1768) was the Prince-Bishop of Augsburg from 1740 to 1768.

== Early life ==
Landgrave Joseph Ignaz Philipp of Hesse-Darmstadt was born in Brussels on 22 January 1699, the son of Philip of Hesse-Darmstadt and his wife Princess Marie Ernestine of Croy-Havré (1673–1714), second daughter of Ferdinand Joseph von Croÿ, 3rd Duke of Havré (1644–1694). He was raised partially in Mantua.

== Biography ==
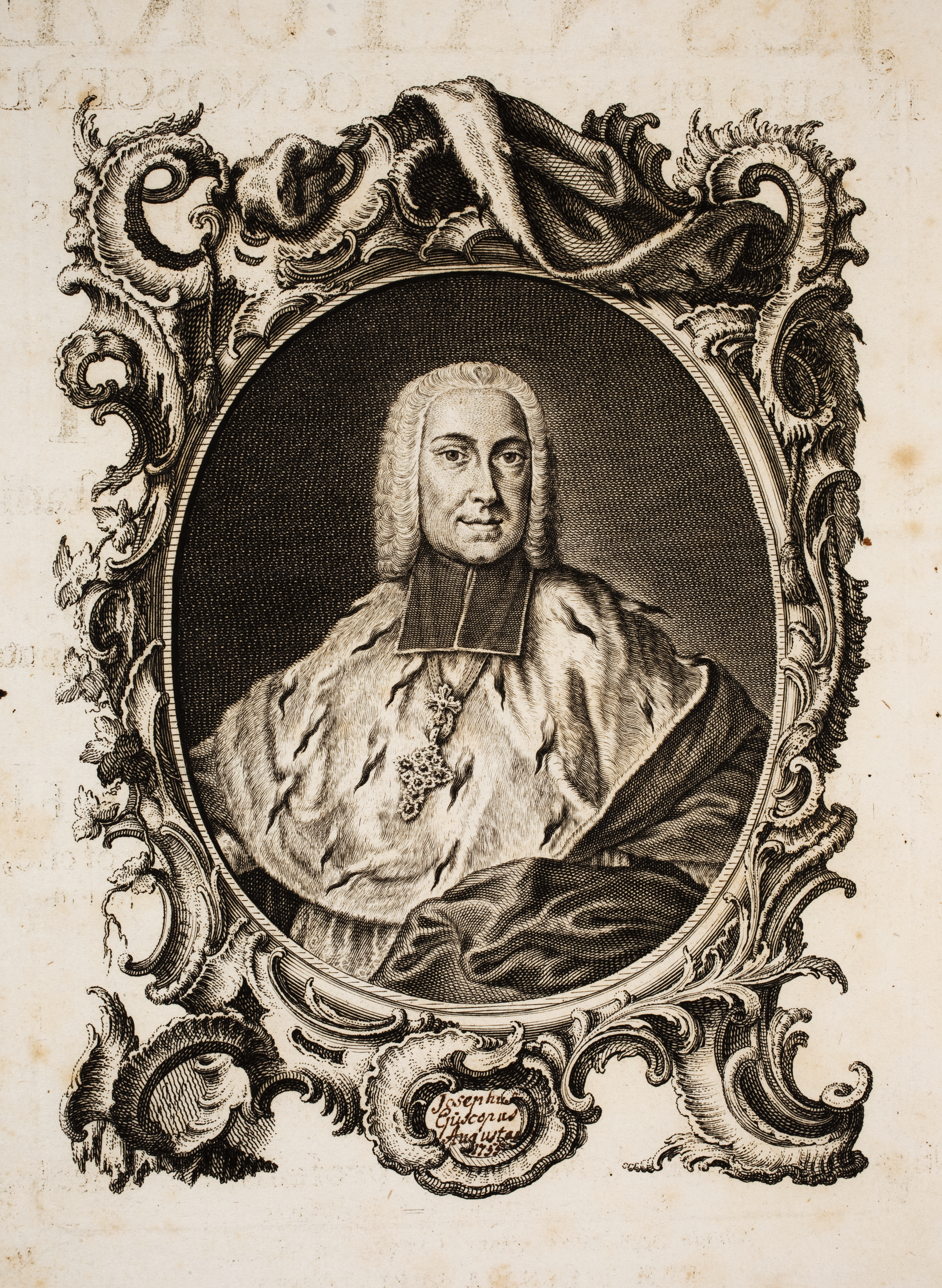
Engraving of Joseph, 1855

He was ordained as a priest in Augsburg on 13 March 1729. The cathedral chapter of Augsburg Cathedral elected him to be Prince-Bishop of Augsburg on 18 August 1740 and Pope Benedict XIV confirmed this appointment on 2 January 1741. He was subsequently consecrated as a bishop by Johann Jakob von Mayr, auxiliary bishop of Augsburg, on 12 February 1741.

On 29 April 1764 the cathedral chapter of Augsburg Cathedral elected Prince Clemens Wenceslaus of Saxony as his coadjutor bishop, an appointment approved by Pope Clement XIII only on the condition that Prince Clemens Wenceslaus of Saxony would renounce his titles of Prince-Bishop of Freising and Prince-Bishop of Regensburg upon becoming Prince-Bishop of Augsburg.

Joseph Ignaz Philipp von Hessen-Darmstadt died in Plombières-les-Bains on 20 August 1768.

== Bibliography ==
- Alessandro Cont, La Chiesa dei principi - Le relazioni tra Reichskirche, dinastie sovrane tedesche e stati italiani (1688–1763), preface of Elisabeth Garms-Cornides, Trento, Provincia autonoma di Trento, 2018, pp. 165–169, https://www.academia.edu/38170694/La_Chiesa_dei_principi._Le_relazioni_tra_Reichskirche_dinastie_sovrane_tedesche_e_stati_italiani_1688-1763_prefazione_di_Elisabeth_Garms-Cornides_Trento_Provincia_autonoma_di_Trento_2018

Catholic Church titles
Preceded by Johann Franz Schenk von Stauffenberg	Prince-Bishop of Augsburg; 1740 – 1768	Succeeded by Prince Clemens Wenceslaus of Saxony
