= Jakob Fugger (bishop) =

Prince Bishop of Constance (1567–1626)

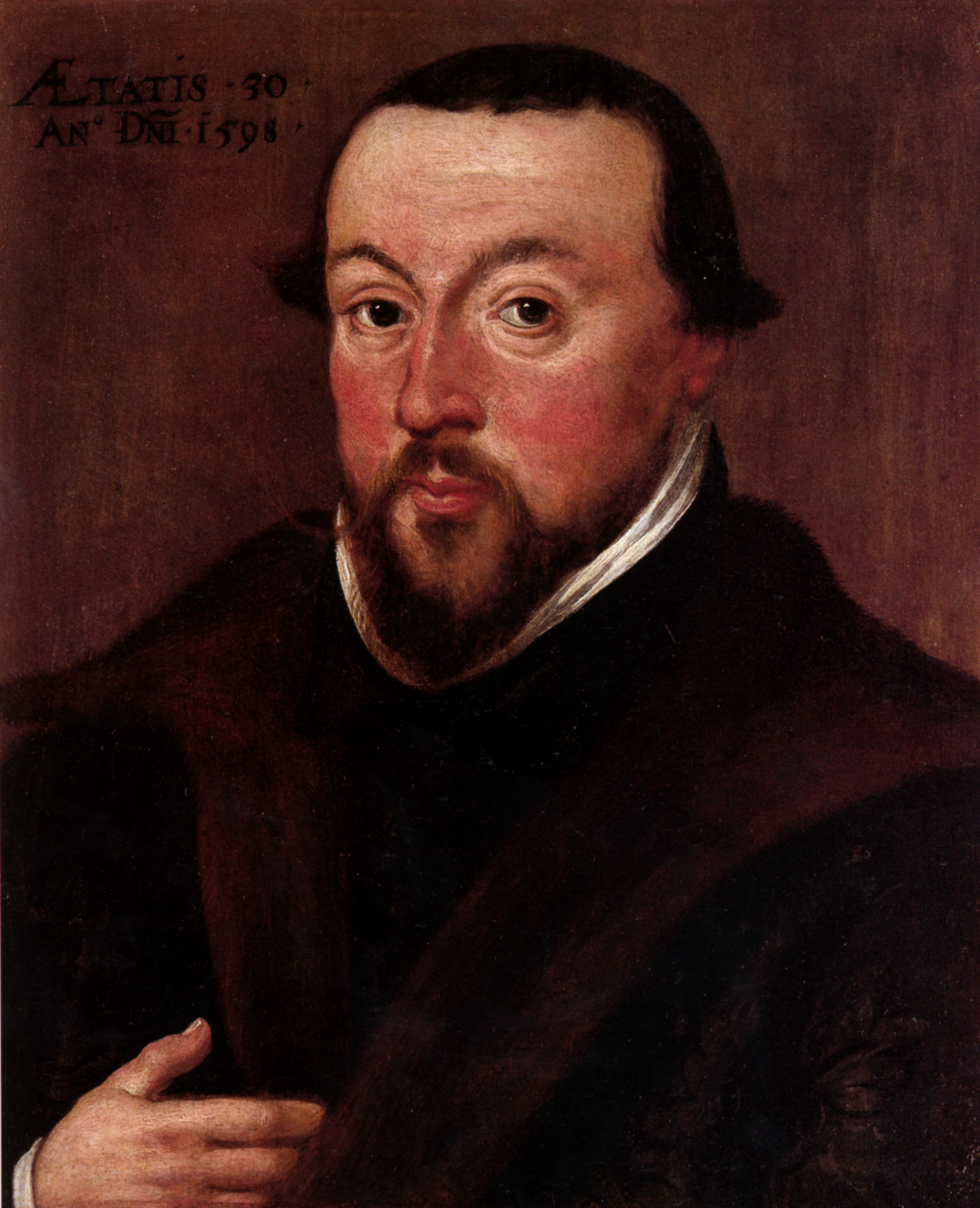
Portrait of Fugger in the Rosgartenmuseum in Konstanz.

Jakob or Johann Jakob Fugger (18 October 1567 - 14 January 1626) was Prince Bishop of Constance from 1604 until his death.

== Life ==
Born in Meersburg (Note: According to the HLS - the NDB gives no birthplace.) into the Fugger family of bankers and merchants, he belonged to baron Hans Fugger's branch, based in Meersburg. He initially studied from 1575 onwards at the Jesuit-run University of Dillingen at Dillingen an der Donau, before moving in 1577 to the University of Ingolstadt, where he studied alongside the composer Gregor Aichinger.

In 1587 he took up a post at Konstanz Minster. Between 1579 and 1590 he spent long periods in Italy and Spain and in 1592 he celebrated his first mass in Augsburg, though it is unknown when and where he was ordained priest.

He was elected bishop in 1604, with his main task being to settle the affairs of the financially-troubled diocese and its disputes with the cantons of central Switzerland. He signed a concordat with the Abbey of Saint Gall in 1613, amended in 1624 - this established the legal opinions of the prince-bishops and abbots and formed the basis for an independent collegiate curia at Saint Gall, known as a judicial vicar. He also donated the silver altar in the Minster's choir, rebuilt Reichenau Abbey to the south of the Minster, and built the Little House in Meersburg. He died in Constance or Meersburg. (Note: according to HLS Konstanz, according to NDB died in Meersburg, buried in Konstanz)

== Bibliography (in German) ==
- Herbert Frey: 'Jakob Fugger.' In: Historisches Lexikon der Schweiz.
- Hans Jürgen Rieckenberg (1961). "Fugger, Jakob". Neue Deutsche Biographie (in German). Vol. 5. Berlin: Duncker & Humblot. pp. 719–720. (full text online).
- J. Holsenbürger: Die Herren v. Deckenbrock (v. Droste-Hülshoff) und ihre Besitzungen. Münster i.W. 1869.

== Notes ==
Catholic Church titles
Preceded by Johann Georg von Hallwyl	Bishop of Constance; 1604-1626	Succeeded by Werner von Praßberg
