= Johann Franz Schenk von Stauffenberg =

Prince-Bishop of Augsburg from 1737 to 1740

- Prince-Bishop of Augsburg
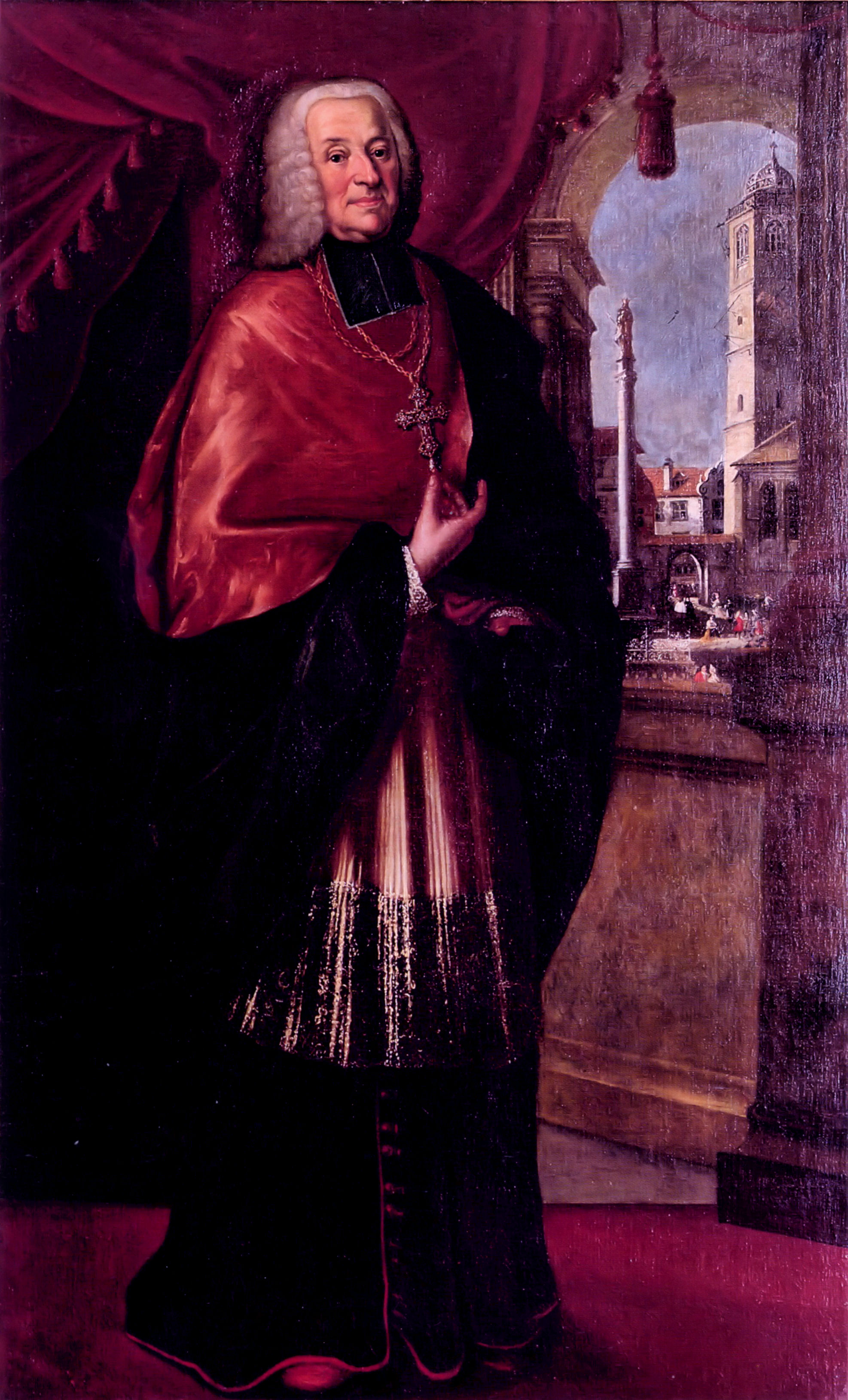
- Portrait in full ornate, c. 1737–40
- Church: Roman Catholic Church
- See: Diocese of Augsburg
- Appointed: 10 June 1704
- In office: 24 January 1737 – 12 June 1740
- Predecessor: Alexander Sigismund von der Pfalz-Neuburg
- Successor: Joseph Ignaz Philipp von Hessen-Darmstadt
- Other post: Prince-Bishop of Constance (1704–1740)

Orders
- Ordination: 11 November 1704
- Consecration: 26 April 1705 by Vincenzo Bichi

Personal details
- Born: 18 February 1658 Lautlingen
- Died: 12 June 1740 (aged 82) Meßkirch
- Parents: Wolfgang Friedrich Schenk von Stauffenberg (father); Anna Barbara von Wernau (mother)

Johann Franz Schenk von Stauffenberg (18 February 1658 – 12 June 1740) was Prince-Bishop of Constance from 1704 to 1740 and Prince-Bishop of Augsburg from 1737 to 1740.

== Early life ==
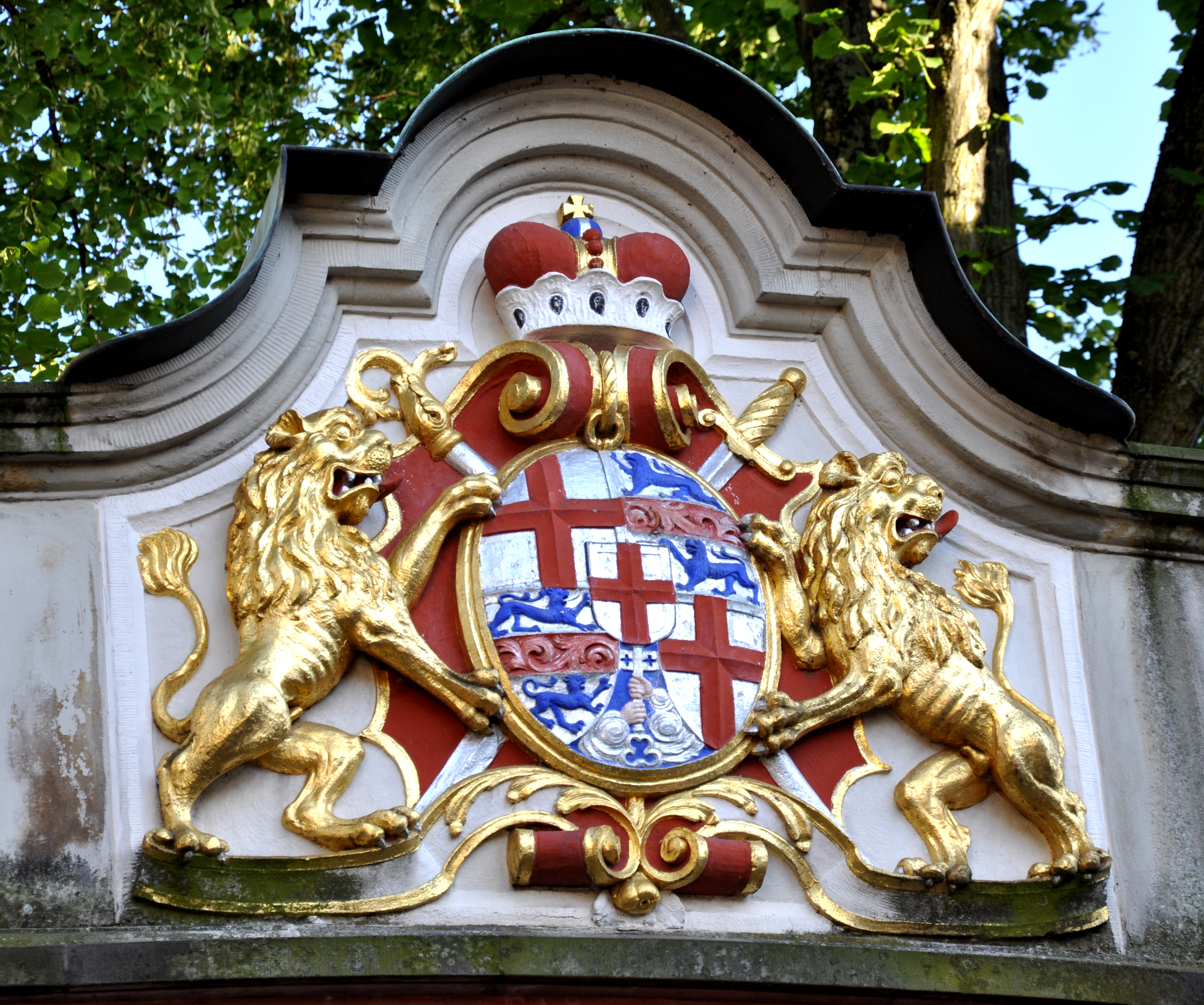
His coat of arms at Neues Schloss (Meersburg)

Johann Franz Schenk von Stauffenberg was born in Lautlingen on 18 February 1658 as the fourth son of Wolfgang Friedrich Schenk von Stauffenberg (1612-1676) and his wife, Anna Barbara von Wernau (1632-1681).

== Biography ==
He was made a canon of Konstanz Cathedral in 1667. He studied in Dillingen an der Donau until 1675. His father died in 1676 and his mother at 1681, after which time his uncles Hans Georg von Wernau and Franz Wilhelm von Stain acted as his guardians. He became a canon of Augsburg Cathedral in 1682.

In 1694, he became coadjutor bishop of Constance. Upon the death of Marquard Rudolf von Rodt, Bishop of Constance, on 10 June 1704, he succeeded as Bishop of Constance. He was ordained as a priest on 11 November 1704. On 26 January 1705 Pope Clement XI confirmed his appointment and he was subsequently consecrated as a bishop by Vincenzo Bichi, Bishop of Frascati, on 26 April 1705.

Following a bout of mental illness on the part of Alexander Sigismund von der Pfalz-Neuburg, Prince-Bishop of Augsburg, on 11 June 1714, the cathedral chapter of Augsburg Cathedral elected Stauffenberg coadjutor bishop of Augsburg, and the appointment was confirmed by Pope Clement XI on 24 September 1714. He succeeded as Prince-Bishop of Augsburg upon the death of Alexander Sigismund von der Pfalz-Neuburg on 24 January 1737.

He died in Meßkirch on 12 June 1740.

== Notes and references ==
Catholic Church titles
Preceded by Marquard Rudolf von Rodt	Prince-Bishop of Constance; 1704 – 1740	Succeeded by Hugo Damian von Schönborn
Preceded by Alexander Sigismund von der Pfalz-Neuburg	Prince-Bishop of Augsburg; 1737 – 1740	Succeeded by Joseph Ignaz Philipp von Hessen-Darmstadt
