= Johann von Blatten =

German Roman Catholic prelate (died 1461)

Most Reverend Johann von Blatten
- Auxiliary Bishop of Konstanz; Titular Bishop of Belline
- Church: Catholic Church
- Diocese: Diocese of Konstanz
- In office: 1441–1461
- Successor: Thomas Weldner

Personal details
- Died: Dec 1461 Konstanz, Germany

Johann von Blatten, O.F.M. (died 1461) was a Roman Catholic prelate who served as Auxiliary Bishop of Konstanz (1441–1461).

== Biography ==
Johann von Blatten was ordained a priest in the Order of Friars Minor. On 30 Jan 1441, he was appointed during the papacy of Pope Eugene IV as Auxiliary Bishop of Konstanz and Titular Bishop of Belline. He served as Auxiliary Bishop of Konstanz until his resignation on 4 Jan 1461. He died in Dec 1461. While bishop, he was the principal co-consecrator of Arnold von Rotperg, Bishop of Basel (1451).

== See also ==
- Catholic Church in Germany

Catholic Church titles
Preceded by	Auxiliary Bishop of Konstanz; 1441–1461	Succeeded by Thomas Weldner
