= Clemens Wenceslaus of Saxony =

Prince-Bishop of Augsburg from 1768 to 1812

- Prince-Bishop of Augsburg
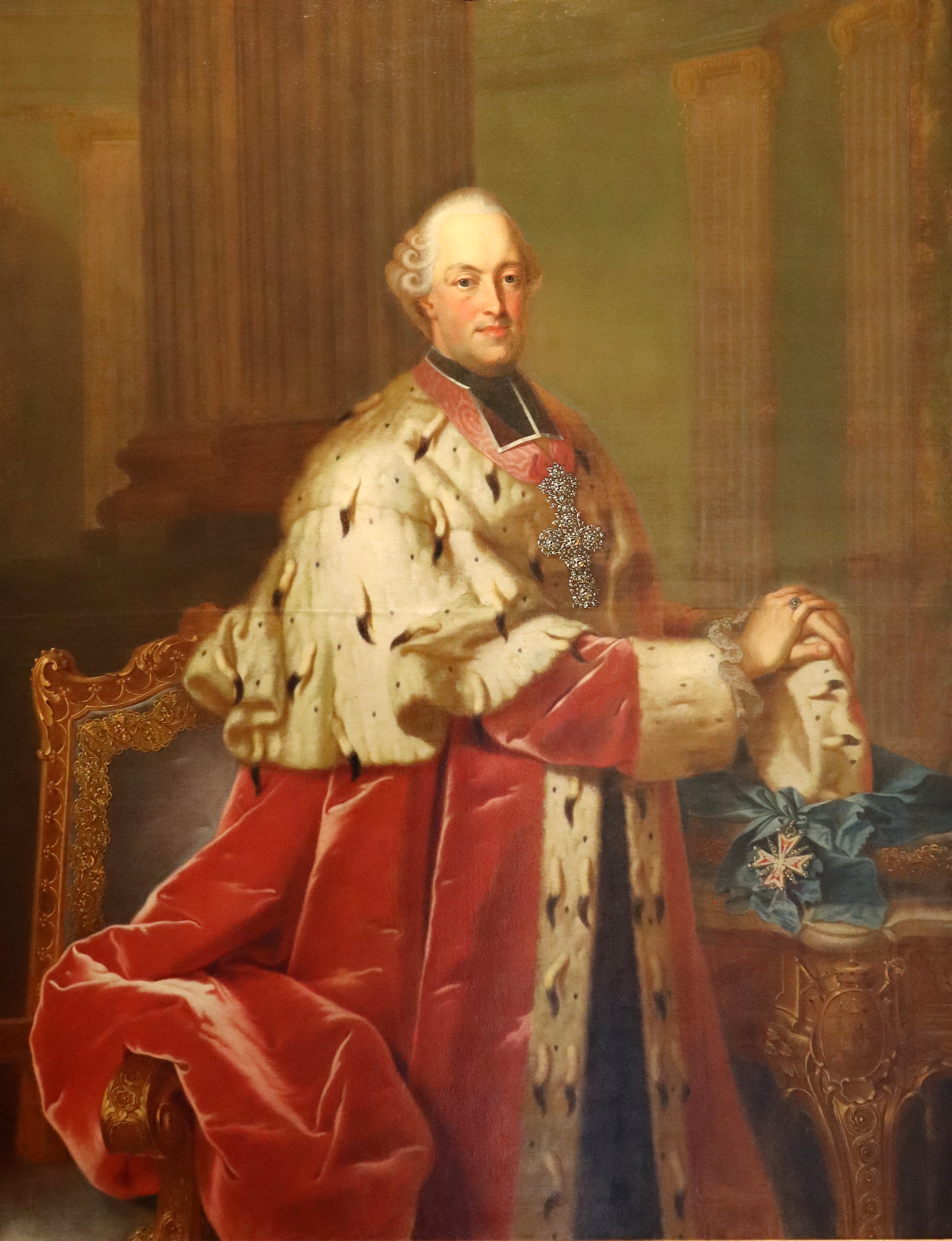
- Portrait by Heinrich Foelix
- Reign: 20 August 1768 – 27 July 1812
- Predecessor: Joseph Ignace Philip of Hesse-Darmstadt
- Successor: Franz Karl Joseph Fürst von Hohenlohe-Waldenburg-Schillingsfürst
- Born: 28 September 1739; Hubertusburg castle, Wermsdorf
- Died: 27 July 1812 (aged 72); Marktoberdorf, Allgäu
- Burial: Marktoberdorf
- House: Wettin
- Father: Augustus III of Poland
- Mother: Maria Josepha of Austria
- Religion: Roman Catholicism
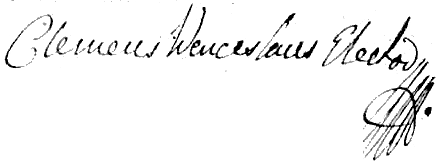
- Signature

Clemens Wenceslaus of Saxony (German: Clemens Wenzeslaus August Hubertus Franz Xaver von Sachsen) (28 September 1739 – 27 July 1812) was a Saxon prince from the House of Wettin and the Archbishop-Elector of Trier from 1768 until 1803, the Prince-Bishop of Freising from 1763 until 1768, the Prince-Bishop of Regensburg from 1763 until 1768, and the Prince-Bishop of Augsburg from 1768 until 1812.

== Biography ==
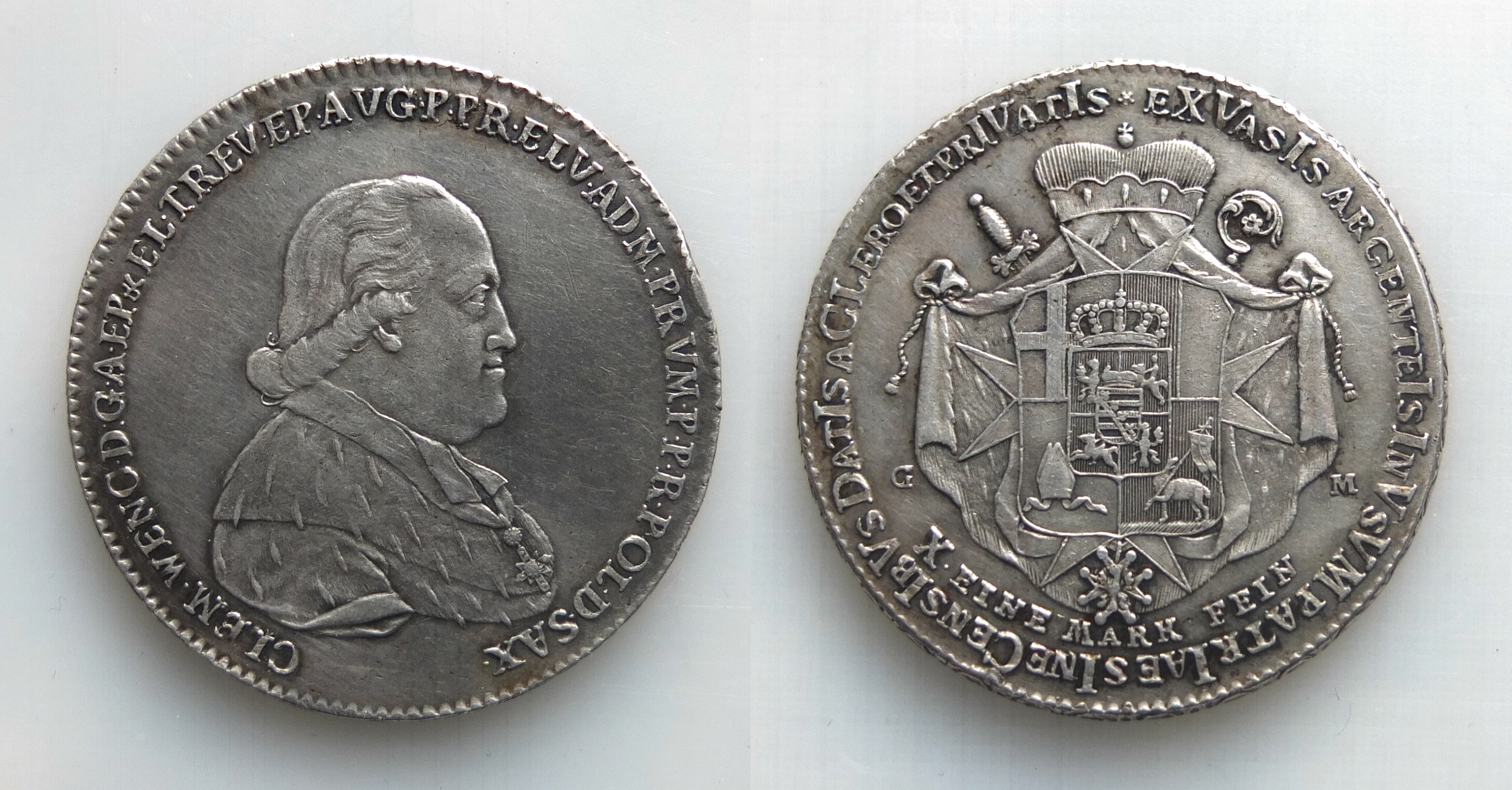
"Kontributionstaler" (1794)

Clemens Wenceslaus was the ninth child of the Prince-Elector Augustus III of Saxony, who was also the King of Poland. In 1760 he went to Vienna and entered the Austrian army as a field marshal. He was present at the Battle of Torgau (3 November 1760), but he decided that warfare was not for him and instead entered the church. On 18 and 27 April 1763 he was elected the Bishops of Freising and Regensburg, respectively, but he abandoned these dioceses for the Archbishopric-Electorate of Trier and the Prince-Bishopric of Augsburg in February and August 1768, respectively, where he already functioned as coadjutor since 1764.

As Archbishop-Elector, Clemens Wenceslaus greatly improved public education, established several non-profit organisations for general education and prosperity, and in 1783 raised an edict of tolerance. He took a mixed view in spiritual affairs. He allowed the Jesuits to remain in Trier after abolishing their order, protested the radical reforms of his cousin, the Emperor Joseph II of Austria, and banned several processions and holidays. Although a modest person who lived simply, he rebuilt Ehrenbreitstein into a magnificent palace and dwelt there. He established the theatre in Coblenz and encouraged music in the archdiocese. Clemens Wenceslaus enjoyed hunting and established a hunting lodge at Kärlich, though he was opposed to several inhumane ways of hunting.

With the outbreak of the French Revolution at the end of the 18th Century, Clemens Wenceslaus became worried. He ceased all reforms and began to rule strictly. He offered refuge to members of the French royal family (King Louis XVI was his nephew) in Schönbornslust palace and allowed Coblenz to become a centre of French monarchism. He and the archbishopric-electorate were greatly affected by the success of the French revolutionary forces, and at the Treaty of Lunéville in 1801, he lost all lands of the electorate west of the River Rhine, retaining only a few small territories pertaining to Trier itself. In 1803 he lost those as well, along with the Prince-Bishopric of Augsburg and the Prince-Provostry of Ellwangen Abbey, which were secularized and annexed by the princes of Nassau-Weilburg, the Elector of Bavaria, and the Duke of Württemberg, respectively. Clemens Wenceslaus received a pension of 100,000 guldens and retired to Augsburg, dying in the episcopal summer residence in Marktoberdorf in Allgäu in 1812. He was buried there.

His grandniece Archduchess Maria Clementina of Austria was named after him. Archduchess Maria Clementina was a daughter of Leopold II, Holy Roman Emperor and Maria Luisa of Spain. Maria Luisa was his niece by his sister Maria Amalia of Saxony.

== Ancestry ==
Ancestors of Clemens Wenceslaus of Saxony

16. John George II, Elector of Saxony
8. John George III, Elector of Saxony
17. Magdalena Sibylle of Brandenburg-Bayreuth
4. Augustus II of Poland
18. Frederick III of Denmark
9. Anne Sophie of Denmark
19. Sophie Amalie of Brunswick-Lüneburg
2. Augustus III of Poland
20. Erdmann August of Brandenburg-Bayreuth
10. Christian Ernst, Margrave of Brandenburg-Bayreuth
21. Sophie of Brandenburg-Ansbach
5. Christiane Eberhardine of Brandenburg-Bayreuth
22. Eberhard III, Duke of Württemberg
11. Sophie Luise of Württemberg
23. Anna Catharina of Salm-Kyrburg
1. Clemens Wenceslaus of Saxony
24. Ferdinand III, Holy Roman Emperor
12. Leopold I, Holy Roman Emperor
25. Maria Anna of Spain
6. Joseph I, Holy Roman Emperor
26. Philipp Wilhelm, Elector Palatine
13. Eleonore-Magdalena of Neuburg
27. Landgravine Elisabeth Amalie of Hesse-Darmstadt
3. Maria Josepha of Austria
28. George, Duke of Brunswick-Lüneburg
14. John Frederick, Duke of Brunswick-Lüneburg
29. Anne Eleonore of Hesse-Darmstadt
7. Wilhelmina Amalia of Brunswick
30. Edward, Count Palatine of Simmern
15. Benedicta-Henrietta of Simmern
31. Anna Gonzaga

== Notes and references ==
Clemens Wenceslaus of Saxony House of Wettin Born: 28 September 1739 on Hubertusburg castle in Wermsdorf Died: 27 July 1812 in Marktoberdorf
Catholic Church titles
Regnal titles
| Preceded by John Theodore of Bavaria | Prince-Bishop of Freising; 1763 – 1768 | Succeeded by Ludwig Joseph Freiherr von Welden auf Laupheim und Hohenaltingen |
| Preceded by John Theodore of Bavaria | Prince-Bishop of Regensburg; 1763 – 1768 | Succeeded by Anton Ignaz von Fugger-Glött |
| Preceded by Johann Philipp von Walderdorf | Archbishop of Trier; 1768 – 1803 | Succeeded by Charles Mannay as Bishop of Trier |
| Preceded by Johann Philipp von Walderdorf | Elector of Trier; 1768 – 1803 | Electorate annexed to France (west of Rhine, 1801) and Nassau-Weilburg (east of Rhine, 1803) |
| Preceded by Johann Philipp von Walderdorf | Prince-Abbot of Prüm; 1768 – 1801 | Prince-abbey annexed to France |
| Preceded by Joseph Ignace Philip of Hesse-Darmstadt | Prince-Bishop of Augsburg lost princely regalia in 1803; 1768 – 1812 | Vacant Title next held by Franz Karl Joseph Fürst von Hohenlohe-Waldenburg-Schillingsfürst as Bishop of Augsburg sede vacante 1812 – 1818 |
| Preceded by Anton Ignaz von Fugger-Glött | Prince-Provost of Ellwangen; 1787 – 1803 | Prince-Provostry secularised and incorporated into Württemberg |
