= Franz Johann von Vogt von Altensumerau und Prasberg =

Most Reverend Franz Johann von Vogt von Altensumerau und Prasberg
- Bishop of Konstanz
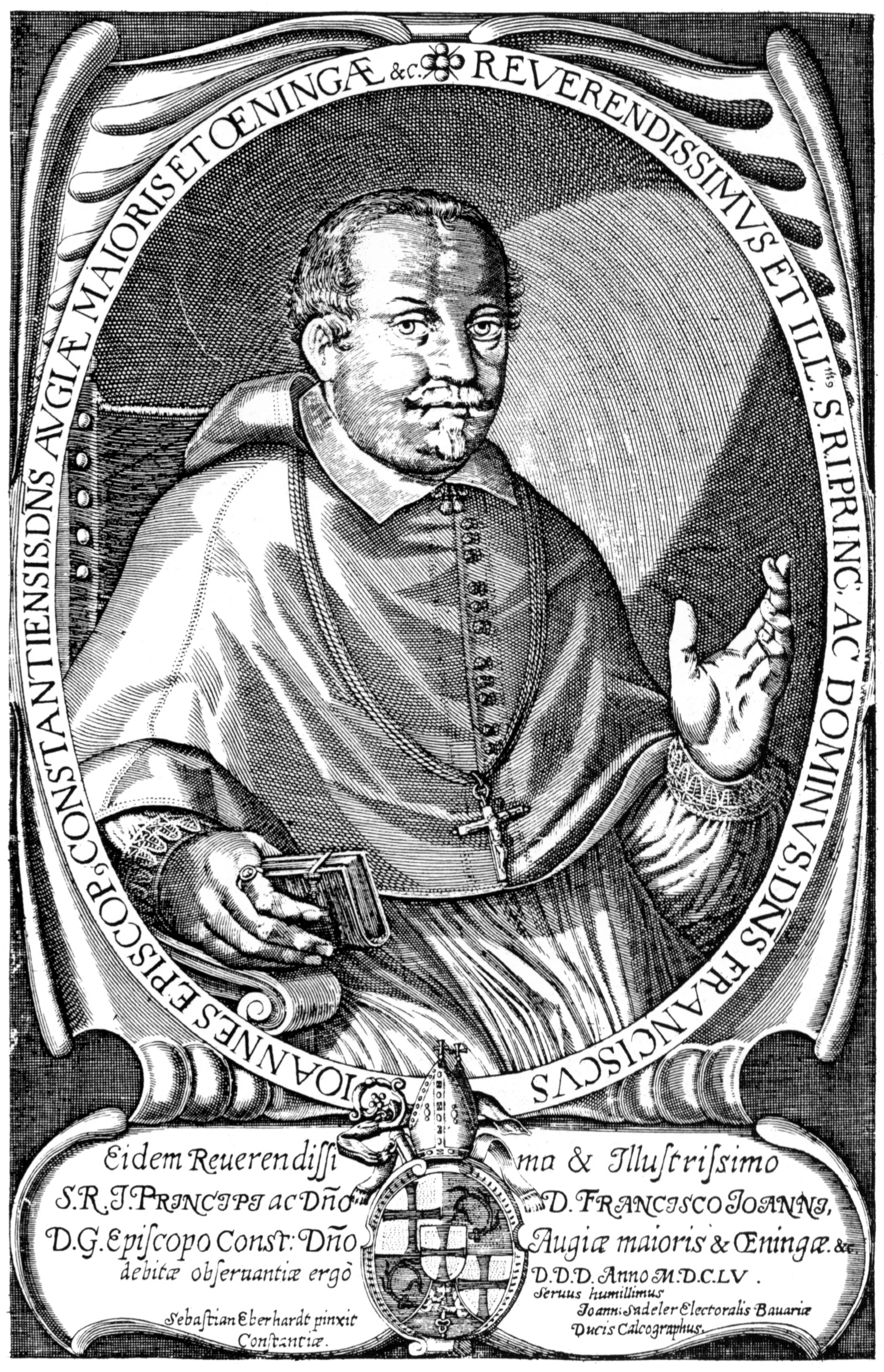
- Church: Catholic Church
- Diocese: Diocese of Konstanz
- In office: 1645–1689
- Predecessor: Johannes Truchseß von Waldburg-Wolfegg
- Successor: Marquard Rudolf von Rodt
- Previous post: Auxiliary Bishop of Konstanz (1641–1645)

Orders
- Ordination: 3 March 1635
- Consecration: 22 December 1641 by Ciriaco Rocci

Personal details
- Born: 6 November 1611 Syberschweiler, Germany
- Died: 7 March 1689 (age 77) Konstanz, Germany

Franz Johann von Vogt von Altensumerau und Prasberg (6 November 1611 – 7 March 1689) was a Roman Catholic prelate who served as Auxiliary Bishop of Konstanz (1641–1645) and then as Bishop of Konstanz (1645–1689).

== Biography ==
Franz Johann von Vogt von Altensumerau und Prasberg was born in Syberschweiler, Germany on 6 November 1611 and ordained a priest on 3 March 1635. On 16 December 1641, he was appointed during the papacy of Pope Urban VIII as Auxiliary Bishop of Konstanz and Titular Bishop of Megara. On 22 December 1641, he was consecrated bishop by Ciriaco Rocci, Cardinal-Priest of San Salvatore in Lauro, with Alfonso Gonzaga, Titular Archbishop of Rhodus, and Alphonse Sacrati, Bishop Emeritus of Comacchio serving as co-consecrators. On 16 February 1645, he was selected as Bishop of Konstanz and confirmed by Pope Innocent X on 28 May 1645. He served as Bishop of Konstanz until his death on 7 March 1689.

While bishop, he was the principal consecrator of Gabriel Haug, Auxiliary Bishop of Strasbourg (1646).

Catholic Church titles
Preceded by Johann Anton Tritt von Wilderen	Bishop of Konstanz; 1645–1689	Succeeded by Georg Sigismund Müller
Preceded by Johannes Truchseß von Waldburg-Wolfegg	Auxiliary Bishop of Konstanz; 1641–1645	Succeeded by Marquard Rudolf von Rodt
