= Solomon II (bishop of Constance) =

German bishop (died 889)

Solomon (or Salomon) II (died 23 December 889) was the Bishop of Constance from 875 until his death. He was a relative of his predecessor and namesake Solomon I and stood in the middle of an "episcopal dynasty." He was commended for his life when the Annales Fuldenses record his death. He was succeeded by his own namesake and another relative, Solomon III.

== Sources ==
- The Annals of Fulda. (Manchester Medieval series, Ninth-Century Histories, Volume II.) Reuter, Timothy (trans.) Manchester: Manchester University Press, 1992.
