= Louise von Sturmfeder =

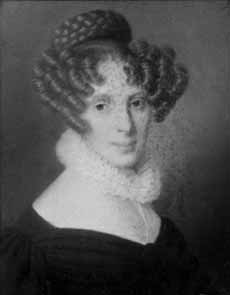
Louise von Sturmfeder-Oppenweiler

Louise von Sturmfeder-Oppenweiler (full name: Maria Aloisia Sturmfeder of Oppenweiler, Erbsassin Lerch von und zu Dirmstein; 3 October 1789, Esslingen - 10 September 1866, Vienna) was a lady-in-waiting to the House of Habsburg.

== Early life ==
Louise was born as daughter of Baron Carl Theodor Sturmfeder von Oppenweiler (1748-1799) and his wife, Maria Charlotte Eva von Greiffenclau-Vollraths, daughter of Adolph von Greiffenclau-Vollraths (* 1727 in Mainz; † 1763 in Mainz).

== Court life ==
She was put in charge of the early upbringing of the royal infants, as aja (governess) to Franz Joseph I of Austria, his brother Maximilian I of Mexico, and his other siblings. She distrusted doctors and prescribed fresh air for her charges. At first, she favoured the elder boy over the second, with unfortunate effects on the latter's character. Hyde, H. Montgomery (1946). Mexican Empire: the History of Maximilian and Carlota of Mexico. London: Macmillan & Co.

== See also ==
- Governess of the Children of France

== Bibliography ==
- Otto Ernst: Franz Joseph I. in seinen Briefen. Rikola Verlag, Wien 1924, hauptsächlich Seiten 44–47
- Ferdinand Anders, Klaus Eggert: Maximilian von Mexiko. Niederösterreichisches Verlagshaus St. Pölten, 1982
- Anton Bettelheim: Biographisches Jahrbuch und Deutscher Nekrolog. Band 2, 1898, Seite 445
- Michael Martin (Hrsg.): Dirmstein – Adel, Bauern und Bürger. Chronik der Gemeinde Dirmstein. Selbstverlag der Stiftung zur Förderung der pfälzischen Geschichtsforschung, Neustadt an der Weinstraße 2005, ISBN 3-9808304-6-2
- Hilde Knobloch: Der letzte Monarch. 1. Kapitel, Pustet Verlag, Graz 1949
