= Cromatius =

German bishop

Cromatius, Cormmatius and Grammatius was a bishop, who served as the second Bishop of Vindonissa or (Windisch-)Konstanz from 534 to 562. After the fall of the Burgundian Empire, he was also listed as Bishop of Constance.

He took part in the Council of Clermont in Auvergne in 535 and in the Fifth Council of Orléans in 538, 541 and 549.
