= Johan Weze =

Danish diplomat and bishop

Johan Weze (1490–13 June 1548), also known as Johan von Weeze, was a secretary of King Christian II of Denmark and a diplomat at the service of the Holy Roman Emperor Charles V. In 1522, he was appointed Archbishop of Lund. He followed Christian II into exile but resigned as his secretary when Christian refused to follow the policies of his brother-in-law the Emperor Charles V. In 1527 Weze joined the service of the Emperor as a diplomat and participated in numerous missions in the Holy Roman Empire. He was appointed Prince Bishop of Constance in 1537, a post he held until his death in 1548.
