= Bubulcus (bishop) =

German bishop

Bubulcus, Boulcus or Bovicus of Vindonissa was a bishop. From 517 to 534 he was the first bishop of Vindonissa (Bishopric of Windisch-Konstanz). As such he took part in the Synod of Epao-Jenne in Burgundy in 517.

According to an inscription discovered in Vindonissa, the seat of the bishopric was moved to Constance in 590. Since there is no clear surviving literary source proving when the diocese of Windisch-Constance was founded, Maximus (or according to other sources Gaudentius) is considered to be the first bishop of Constance with the foundation of the diocese of Constance around 585-590 by the Alemannic dukes with the help of Pope Gregory I.
