= Vindonissa =

Former Roman legion camp in Switzerland

Coordinates: 47.480464°N 8.222051°E

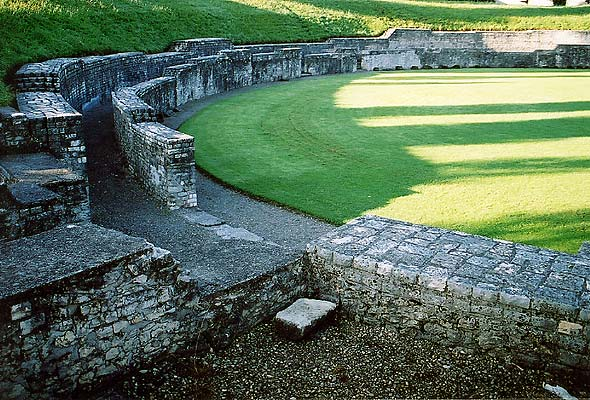
Amphitheater of Vindonissa

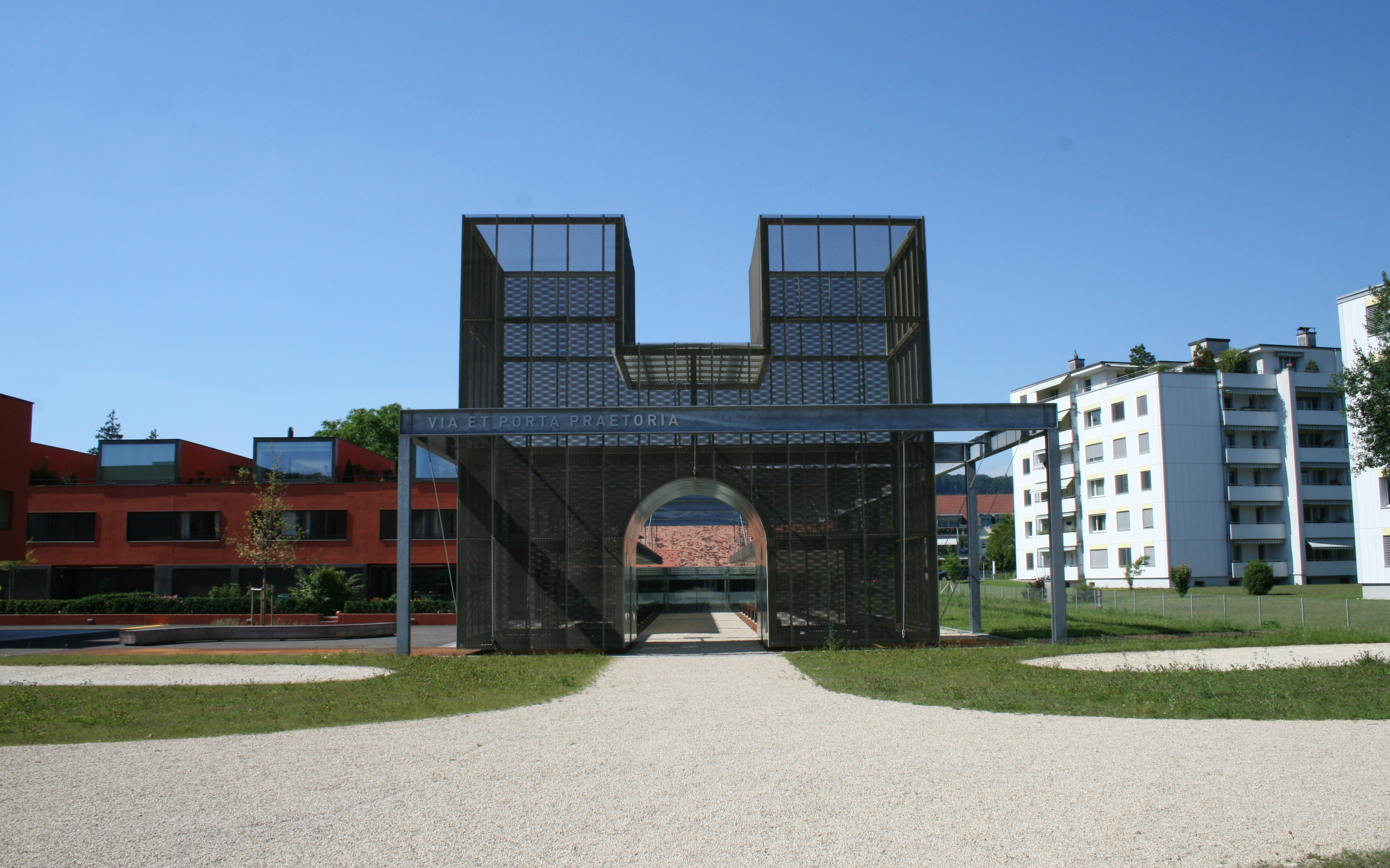
Modern re-construction of the southern gate

Vindonissa (from a Gaulish toponym in *windo- "white") was a Roman legion camp, vicus and later a bishop's seat at modern Windisch, Switzerland. The remains of the camp are listed as a heritage site of national significance. The city of Brugg hosts a small Roman museum, displaying finds from the legion camp.

== History ==
Excavations along the western edge of the Roman camp have discovered a few funeral pyre graves dating to the late Bronze Age (c. 1000–800 BC). The first settlement of Vindonissa was a 1st-century BC Helvetii fortified village on the peninsula between the Aare and Reuss rivers. The settlement was protected by an approximately 350 meters (1,150 ft)-long wood and earth wall, with an up to 7 m (23 ft)-deep trench, which stretched across the narrow neck of the peninsula. The settlement came under Roman control either after the 58 BC conquest of the Helvetii by Julius Caesar or the 15 BC conquest of the Alps.

A small guard-post was established on the site around 15 BC. The Roman settlement and legion camp was probably established in 15 AD. In an expansion around 30, thermal baths were added. The Legio XIII Gemina was stationed at Vindonissa until 44 or 45. With the arrival of the 21st legion (XXI Rapax) the camp was rebuilt with stone fortifications. After the 21st legion had looted the countryside in 69, it was replaced by the 11th legion (XI Claudia), which remained there until 101. After that Vindonissa was a civilian settlement, with a castle built in the 4th century.

The camp established around 15 AD covered an area of about 20 ha (49 acres) and was surrounded by an 1.8 km (1.1 mi)- long wooden and earthen wall with wooden gates and low watchtowers surrounded by a double ditch. By 72 AD this had been replaced by a 3.6 m (12 ft) thick wall with massive gates, watchtowers and a single ditch.

The first systematic excavation of the ruins began in 1896. This and later excavations discovered the ruins of several buildings and numerous artifacts. A 2 kilometers (1.2 mi)-long Roman underground canal still provides water to the fountain at Königsfelden Monastery. Vindonissa included the largest Roman amphitheater in modern Switzerland, with seats for about 10,000. The foundations of the west and north walls and the remains of a Roman bath have been discovered.

A large Flavian-period (c. 69–96 CE) peristyle house was found at the eastern part of the camp, near the principia; It is interpreted as the residence of a high-ranking officer of the 11th legion. A later modification included the installation of an unusually well-preserved Mediterranean-style kitchen with a large raised hearth, one of the few such examples known from the northwestern part of the empire. Finds indicate food preparation for a sizeable household, likely carried out by servants. The finds include a large ceramic assemblage, numerous amphorae for imported goods, and biological remains showing a diet strongly influenced by Roman culinary traditions, with evidence for high-quality meat cuts, game, fish, and imported products such as olive oil, wine, fish sauces, and oysters.

== See also ==
- Early history of Switzerland
- Etymology of Vindonissa
