= Prince-Bishopric of Constance =

Principality of the Holy Roman Empire

Prince-Bishopric of Constance Hochstift Konstanz
- 1155–1803
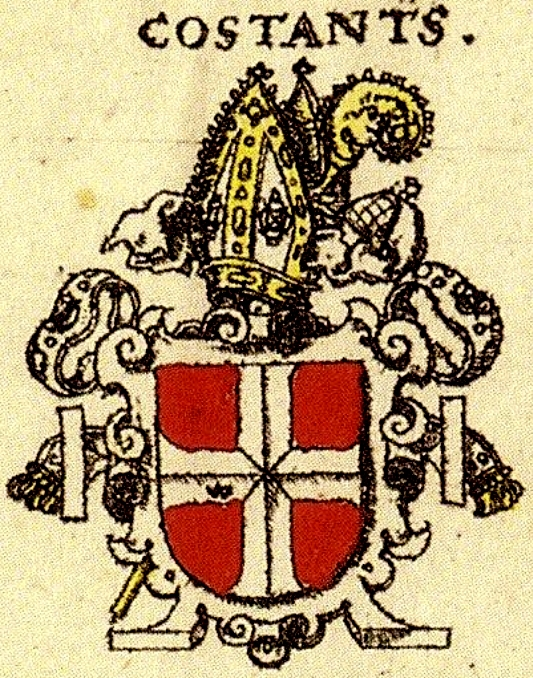
- Coat of arms

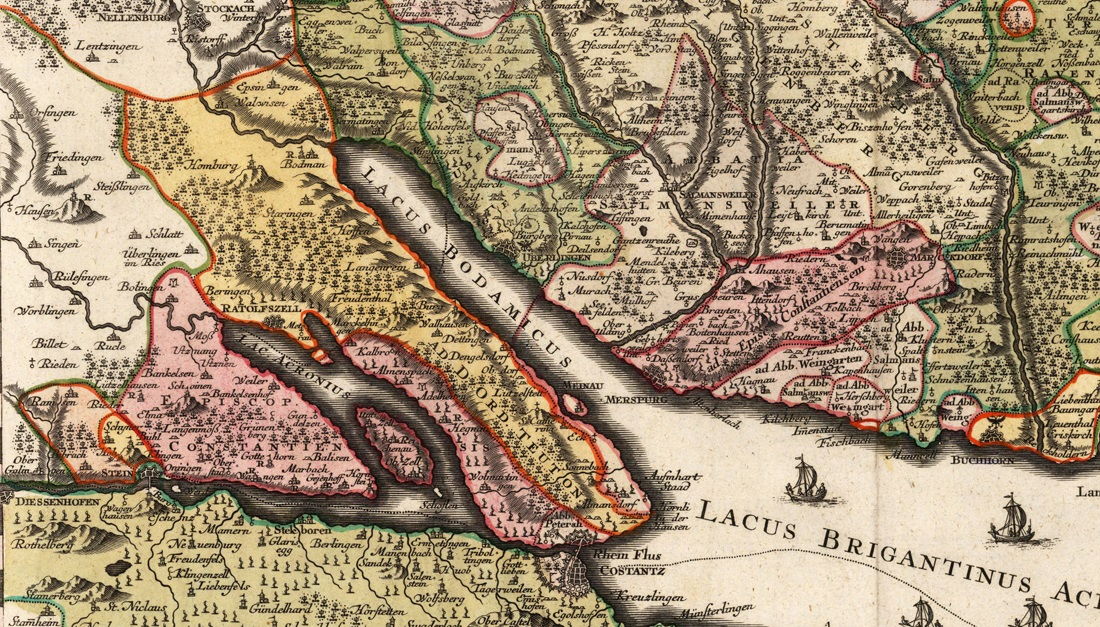
- The Bishopric of Constance lying astride the western end of Lake Constance
- Status: Prince-Bishopric
- Capital: Konstanz; Meersburg (from 1527)
- Common languages: Low Alemannic
- Government: Ecclesiastical principality
- Historical era: Middle Ages; Early modern period
  - Missionary diocese established: 585
  - Prince-Bishopric: 1155
  - Council of Constance: 1414–18
  - Joined Swabian Circle: 1500
  - Mediatised to Baden: 1803
  - Diocese dissolved: 1821
Preceded by	Succeeded by
Duchy of Swabia	Electorate of Baden

The Prince-Bishopric of Constance (German: Hochstift Konstanz, Fürstbistum Konstanz, Bistum Konstanz) was a small ecclesiastical principality of the Holy Roman Empire from the mid-12th century until its secularisation in 1802–1803. In his dual capacity as prince and as bishop, the prince-bishop also administered the Diocese of Konstanz, which existed from about 585 until its dissolution in 1821, and whose territory extended over an area much larger than the principality. It belonged to the ecclesiastical province of Mainz since 780/782.

== Geography ==
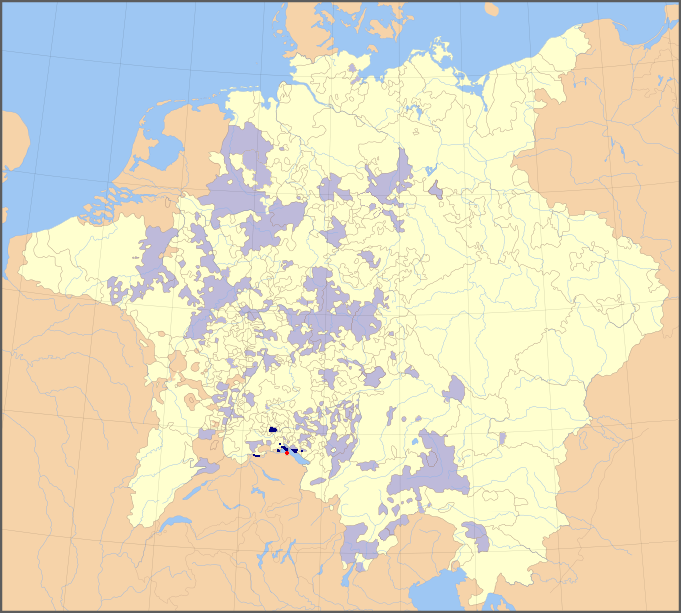

The Imperial immediate territory of the prince-bishopric was scattered on both sides of western Lake Constance, stretching from the Höri peninsula and the High Rhine in the west along Untersee with the Monastic Island of Reichenau, the Bodanrück peninsula, and Lake Überlingen to the Linzgau region in the northeast. This did not include the Imperial City of Constance nor Petershausen Abbey. In the south, the bishop's territory bordered on the Landgraviate of Thurgau which was conquered by the Swiss Confederacy in 1460.

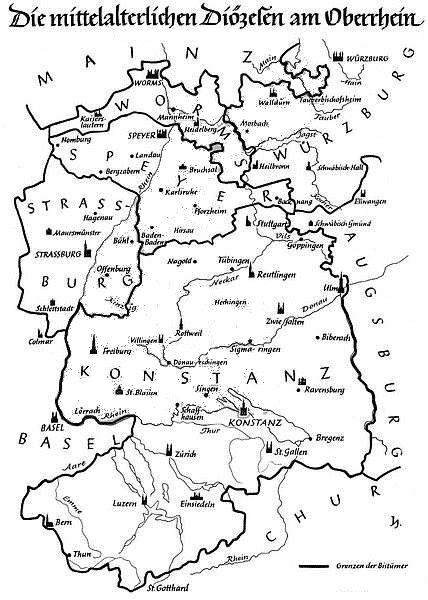
Upper Rhenish dioceses of Constance, Straßburg, Speyer, and Worms, c. 1801

The Imperial state should not be confused with the diocese of the same name, which was considerably larger (see map), covering much of present-day Baden-Württemberg, a large part of Switzerland all the way south to the Gotthard Pass, as well as a small part of Vorarlberg, Austria. While the Prince-Bishop was the secular ruler in his prince-bishopric, his authority in his diocese was limited to the pastoral duties exercised by any bishop.

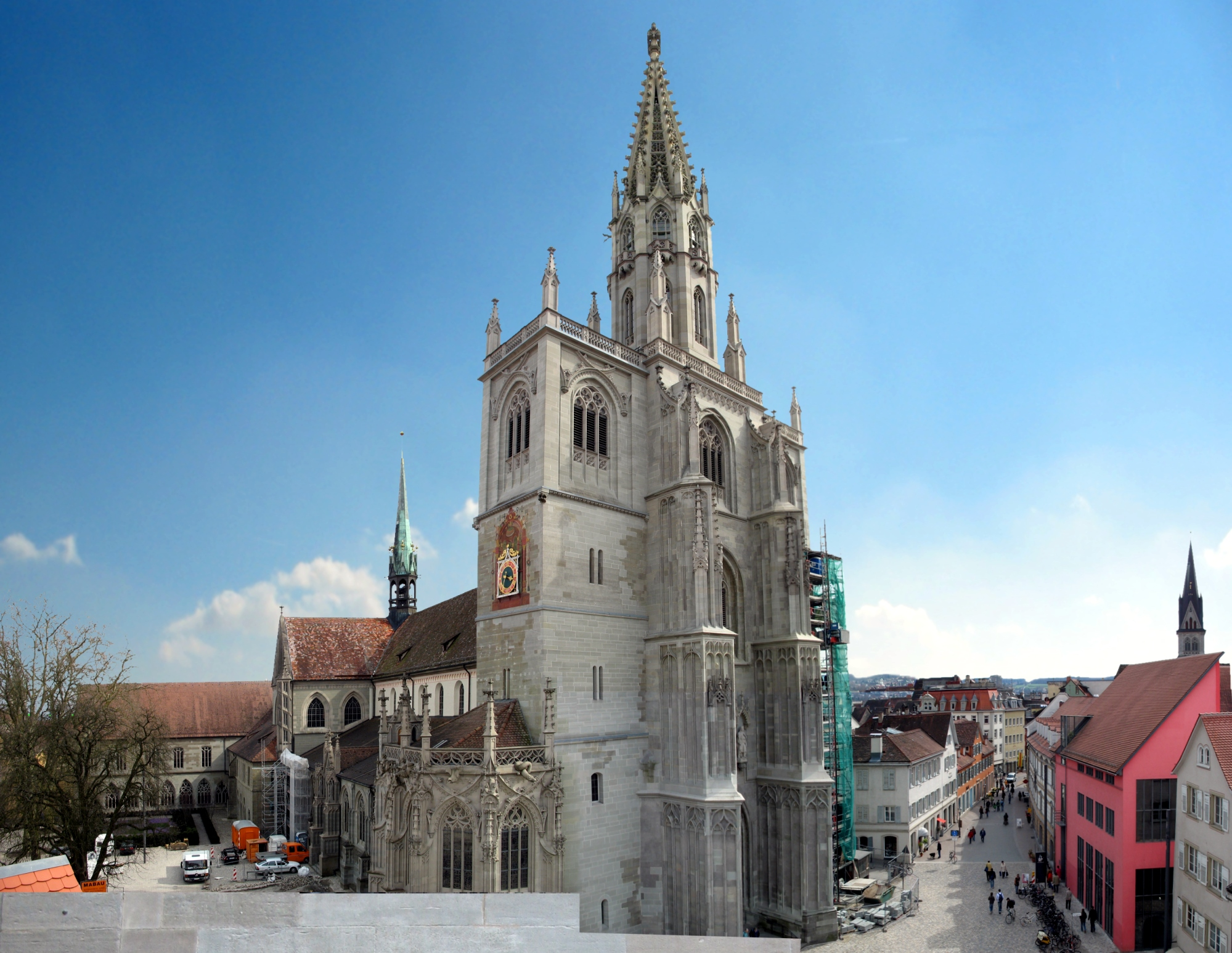
Constance Cathedral

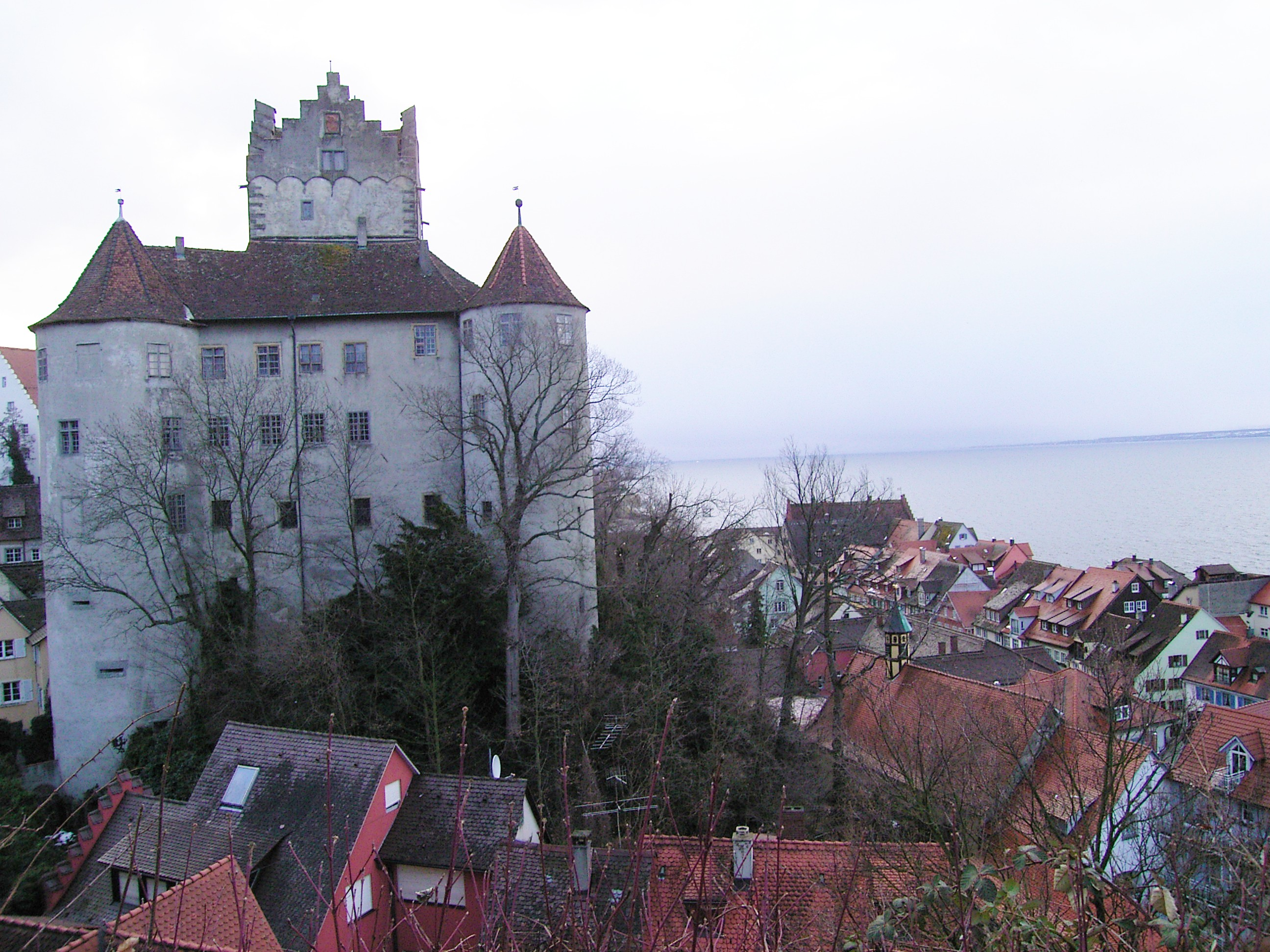
The Old Palace in Meersburg, where the bishops lived until they built a new palace in the 18th century

== History ==
The Roman Catholic Diocese of Constance, one of the largest dioceses of Germany, was first based in the former Roman settlement of Vindonissa, before moving its seat to Constance in the late 6th century during the Christianization of the Alamanni tribes around Lake Constance and the Upper Rhine. Originally subordinated to the Archdiocese of Besançon, Constance became suffragan to the Archdiocese of Mainz in 782.

A deed by Emperor Frederick I Barbarossa in 1155 confirmed the princely status of the bishop and of his bishopric as an Imperial Estate. The territory of the prince-bishopric contracted during the following centuries under pressure from both the Swiss Confederacy and the House of Habsburg. Furthermore, the city of Constance was granted the status of a free imperial city and from then on the bishop's sovereignty in the city was restricted to a small area around the cathedral. In 1527, during the Protestant Reformation, the administrative seat of the Prince-Bishop was finally moved to Meersburg across Lake Constance. However, Constance fell to the Counter-Reformation promoted by the Habsburgs, who eventually abolished its status as a free imperial city and incorporated it into their Further Austrian possessions in 1548.

The huge diocese of Constance suffered heavily during the Reformation and it lost several hundred parishes, convents and other Catholic foundations which were suppressed by the various states, free imperial cities and cantons in Swabia and Switzerland that had become Protestant.

In the course of the German Mediatisation in 1803, the Prince-Bishopric was dissolved and its territory was annexed to the Margraviate of Baden.

In turn, the diocese was dissolved by Pope Pius VII in 1821 after Vicar General Ignaz Heinrich von Wessenberg had been elected diocesan administrator upon the death of the last bishop Karl Theodor von Dalberg in 1817. While Wessenberg was supported by the government of Baden, the Pope never recognized his election on account of Wessenberg's liberal views. By a bull of 16 August 1821, the pope dissolved the diocese in order to prevent Wessenberg from becoming bishop. The area of the diocese in Baden became part of the newly established Roman Catholic Archdiocese of Freiburg in 1827 while the Swiss areas were incorporated in the Diocese of Basel. As a result of these changes, the cantons of Obwalden and Nidwalden, parts of Uri, Glarus and Zürich were assigned provisionally to the administration of the Diocese of Chur, an arrangement still enduring.

== See also ==
- Council of Constance
