= Kasimir Anton von Sickingen =

German Roman Catholic prelate (1684-1750)

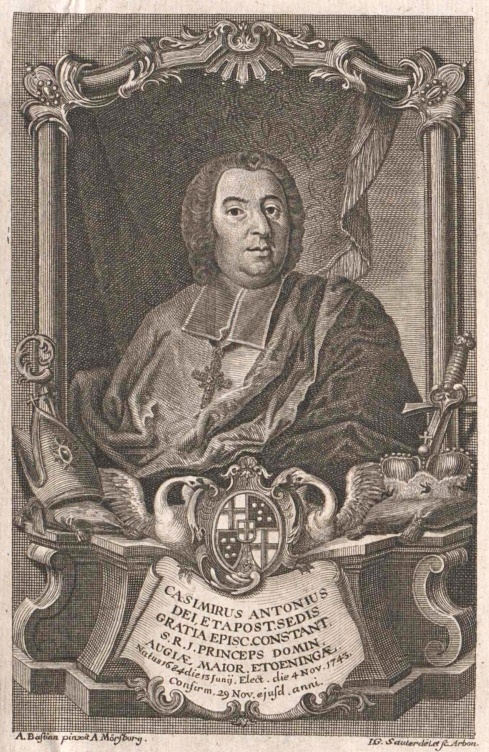
Kasimir Anton von Sickingen with his episcopal coat of arms

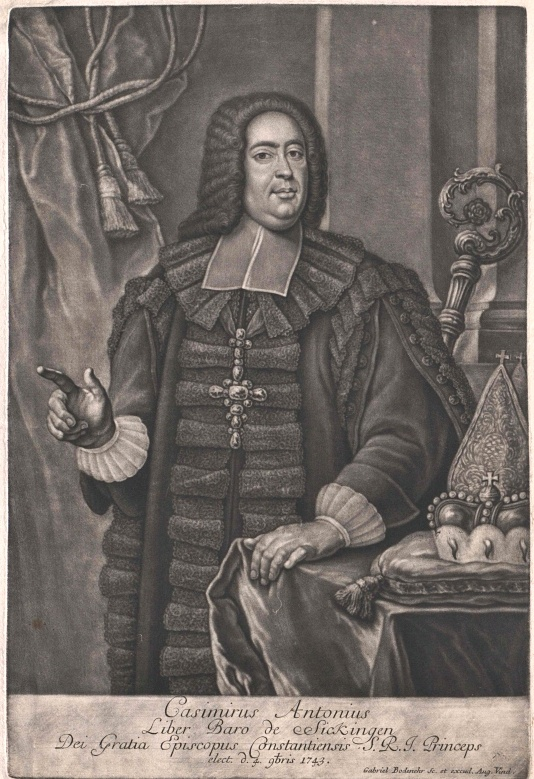
Kasimir Anton von Sickingen

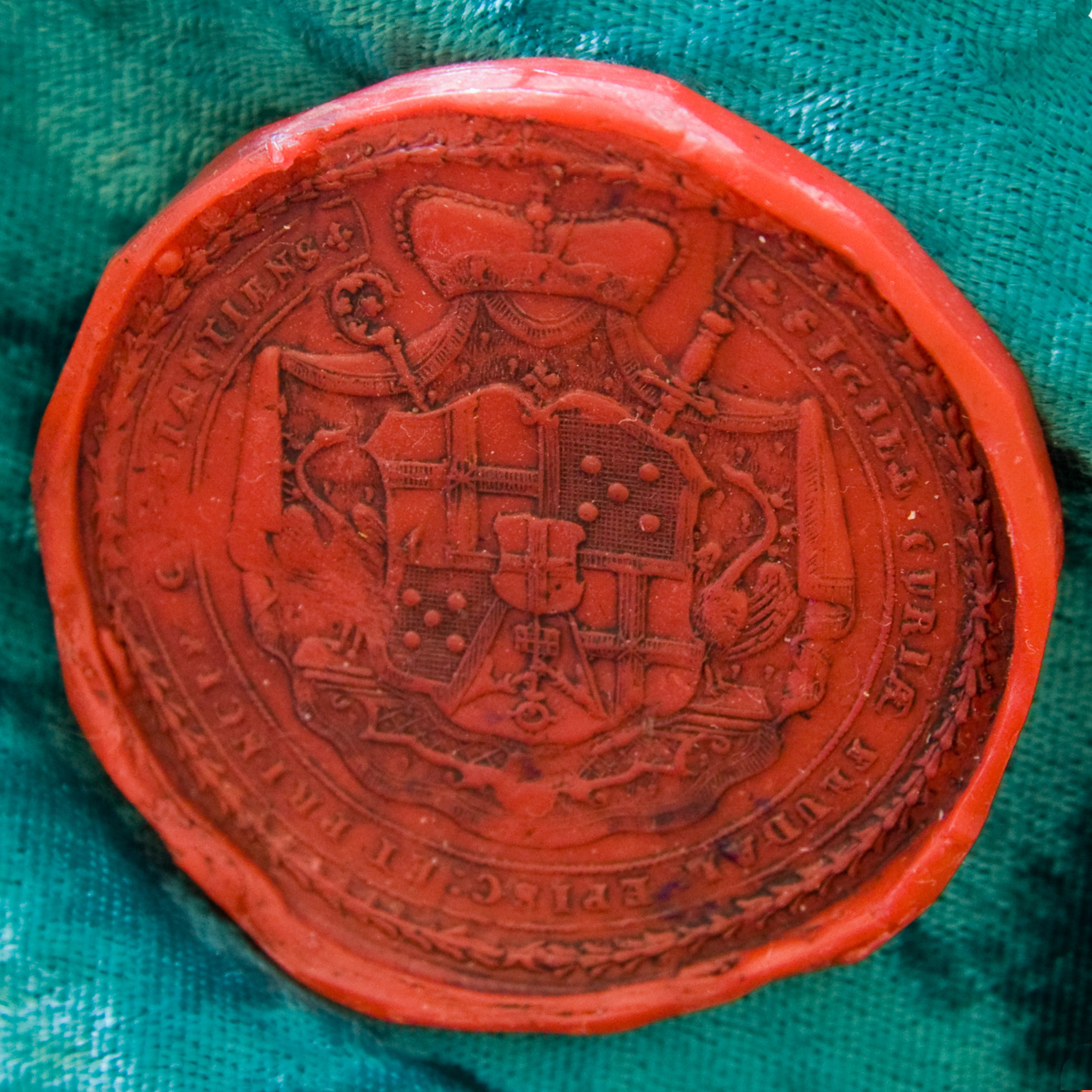
His seal in the Neues Schloss.

Kasimir Anton von Sickingen or Casimir Anton von Sickingen Reichsfreiherr von und zu Hohenburg (16 June 1684 – 29 August 1750) was a German Roman Catholic prelate who from 1743 to 1750 was prince-bishop of Constance.

== Family ==
He was from the noble van Sickingen family. His father was freiherr Franz Ferdinand von Sickingen (1638–1687) and his mother countess Anna Maria Franziska Katharina von Dalberg (died 1697). His great-grandfather Friedrich von Sickingen (1544–1581) was uncle of Franz von Sickingen (1481–1523).

He had eleven siblings, including three priests and Freiburg's imperial governor Ferdinand Hartmann von Sickingen (1673–1743). His sister Maria Theresia (1682–1756) was mother to Franz Konrad von Rodt (1706–1775) and Maximilian Christoph von Rodt (1717–1800), both of them future cardinals and both also Bishops of Constance. He and his brother Ferdinand Hartmann donated a bronze epitaph in Würzburg Cathedral in memory of their priest brothers Friedrich Johann Georg von Sickingen (1668–1719) and Franz Peter von Sickingen (1669–1736).

== Life ==
Born in Ebnet (now a district of Freiburg im Breisgau), Sickingen took the tonsure in 1699. He studied secular law and canon law in Freiburg (where he gained his bachelor's degree in 1700), Siena and Rome. In 1718 he received minor orders and was made a subdeacon - two years later a canon of Mainz Cathedral. He became cantor at the same cathedral in 1743. In the meantime he paid for a statue of St John Nepomuk with a dedicatory inscription beside the Dreisam in his home town of Ebnet (1727) and became provost of Konstanz Minster with imperial approval (1733).

On 4 November 1743 he became Bishop of Konstanz despite not yet being a priest - the following year he was ordained priest on 8 March and consecrated bishop on 30 August. He chose the Neue Schloss in Meersburg as his episcopal residence, built in 1710 by his predecessor Johann Franz Schenk von Stauffenberg.

The Schloss was magnificently furnished by von Sickingen, who also concluded the concordat between the Abbey of Saint Gall and the Diocese of Konstanz, which temporarily ended the dispute over the exemption for the monastery and its territory. His body was buried in Konstanz Minster, though his heart was buried at the church of St. Hilarius in Freiburg.

Preceded by Damian Hugo Philipp von Schönborn-Buchheim	Prince-Bishop of Constance; 1743–1750	Succeeded by Franz Konrad von Rodt
