= Franz Anton Bagnato =

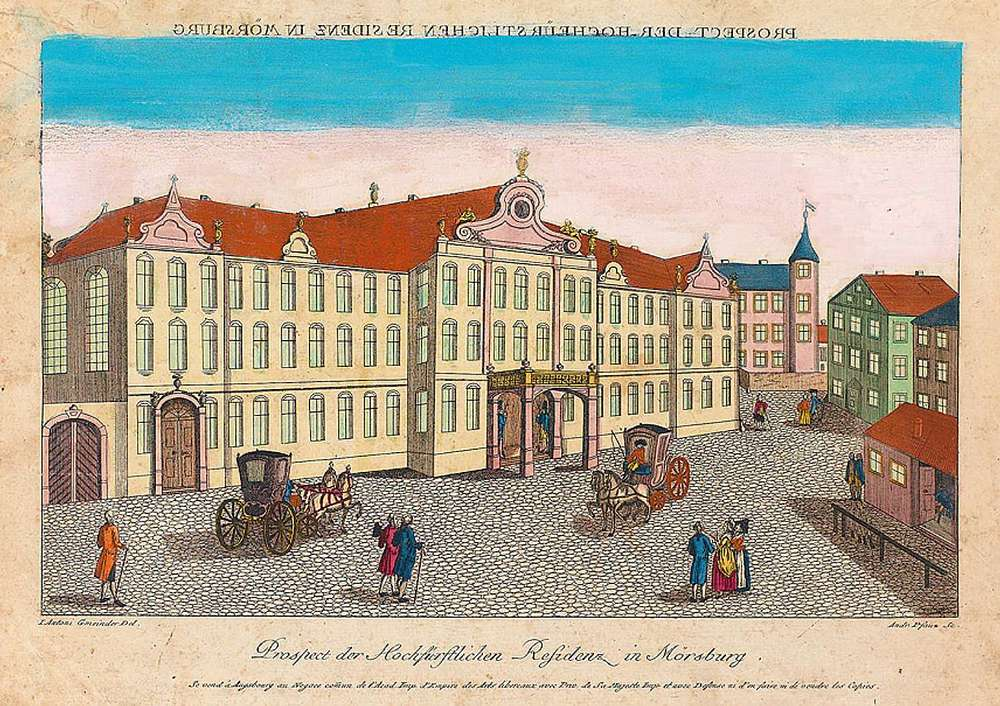
New Castle in Meersburg, c. 1780

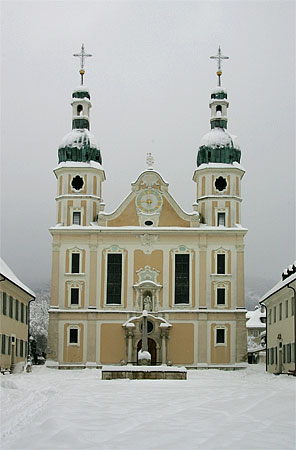
Church in Arlesheim

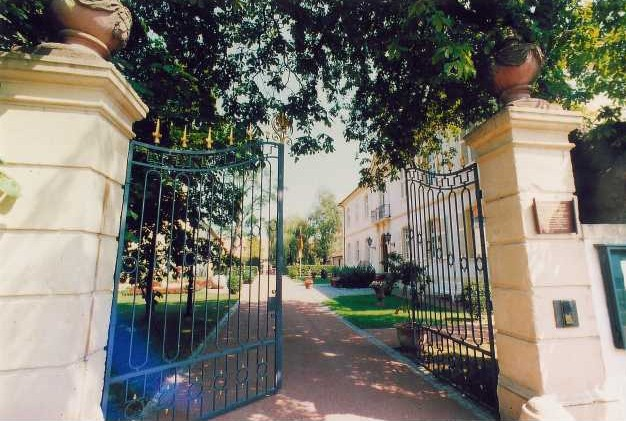
Castle Rimsingen

Franz (Ignaz) Anton Bagnato, (15 June 1731 – 18 June 1810), also known as Francesco Antonio Bagnato, was the son of architect Johann Caspar Bagnato. Franz Anton Bagnato was born in Altshausen. Like his father he was an architect active during the Baroque period. Bagnato is mostly remembered for his works in the service of the Teutonic Knights and the Prince-Bishop of Constance.

From 1759 onwards, he worked for Prince-Bishop Franz Konrad von Rodt of the Bishopric of Constance, finishing amongst others the New Castle and the chapel of the seminary in Meersburg.

== Works ==
- New Castle and chapel of the seminary in Meersburg.
- Alteration of the church in Arlesheim.
- Parish church in Oberdischingen.
- Parish church St. Urban in Herten (part of the city of Rheinfelden, Germany); nowadays used as cemetery church.
- Parish church in Albbruck-Birndorf.
- Parish church in Sauldorf-Rast.
- Castle Bürgeln in Schliengen.
- Castle in Rimsingen.
- Achstetten Castle.
- Fugger-Castle in Oberkirchberg.
- Building of the Teutonic Knights in Wangen im Allgäu.
- Granary in Überlingen.
- Customs building in Waldstetten (Günz).
- Orangery at Castle Altshausen.
- Gate of the building of the Teutonic Knights in Freiburg im Breisgau.
- 1760 Baroque design of Schloss Hohenfels above Kalkofen

== See also ==
- Upper Swabian Baroque Route
