= Against the Murderous, Thieving Hordes of Peasants =

1525 pamphlet by Martin Luther

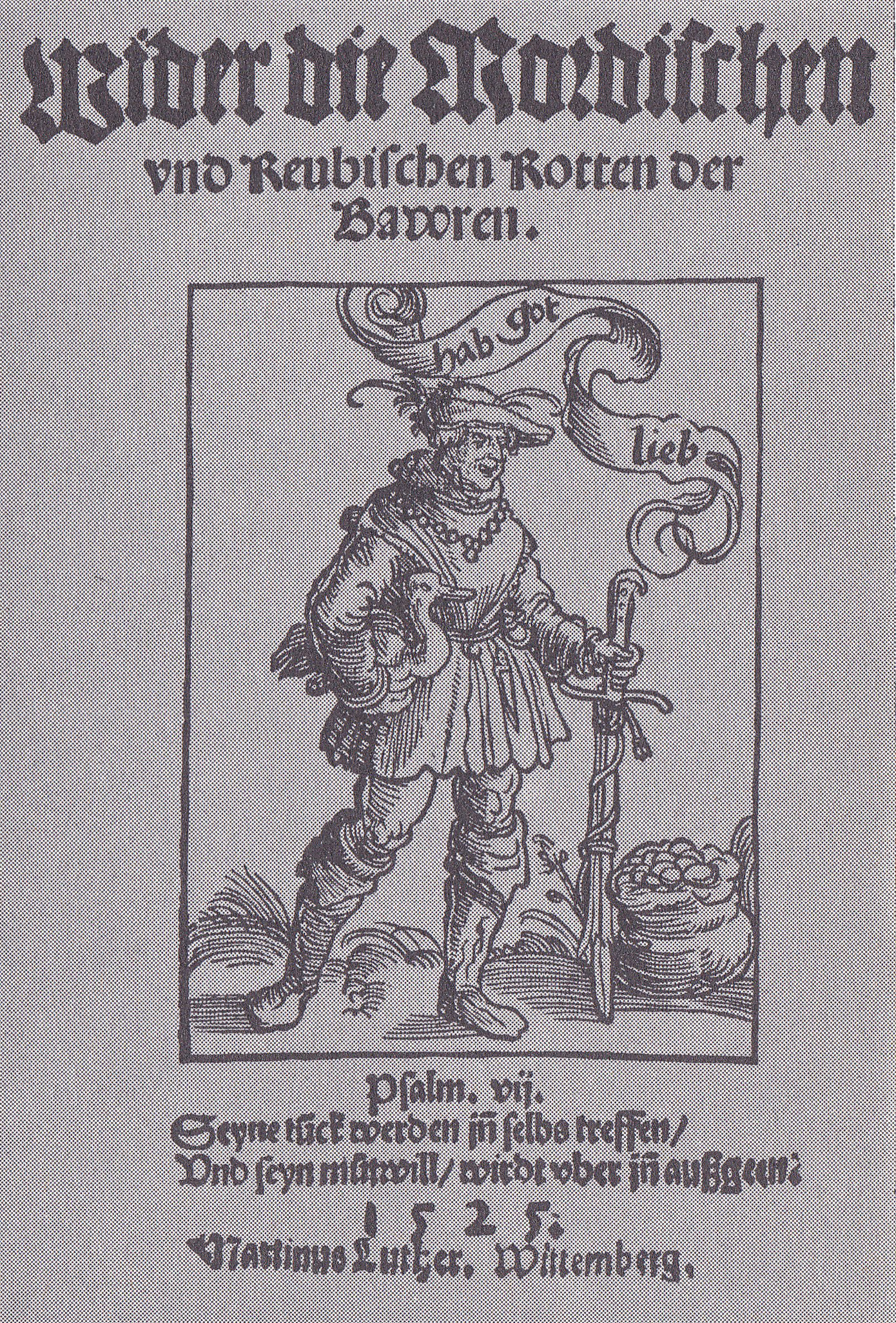
- Author: Martin Luther
- Original title: Wider die Mordischen und Reubischen Rotten der Bawren
- Language: German
- Published: 1525
- Pages: 7
- Preceded by: Admonition to Peace
- Followed by: Open Letter on the Harsh Book Against the Peasants

Against the Murderous, Thieving Hordes of Peasants (German: Wider die Mordischen und Reubischen Rotten der Bawren) is a 1525 pamphlet by Martin Luther in response to the German Peasants' War. Luther's writings are often considered to be one of the foundations for this revolt. He penned the pamphlet to distance himself from their violence and maintain his allegiance to the princes. In the pamphlet, Luther adopts an unusually bloodthirsty position against the rebels.

== Background ==
Ignited in the summer of 1524, the Peasants' War spread across the Germanic regions of the Holy Roman Empire until its suppression in 1525. Many factors played a role in inciting the peasants to revolt. The move from an entirely agrarian economic base during the fourteenth and fifteenth centuries served as a backdrop to the development of new social classes that strained the traditional feudal hierarchy. The peasants' initial grievances were about specific abuses by the Church and government, but they grew to encompass the entire feudal order.

The influence of the Protestant Reformation on the Peasants' War is unclear. Martin Luther's ideas and his doctrine of spiritual freedom offered a religious justification for social and political upheaval. Luther's focus on sola scriptura strengthened the idea of 'divine law'. This doctrine implied no obligation to social constructs that defied divine law.

Other Reformers Huldrych Zwingli and Thomas Müntzer applied this doctrine in their work. From 1523, Zwingli taught that secular laws needed to comport with the gospels. Müntzer cited scripture that seemed to support rebellion against human authority, such as Luke 22:35–38. He invoked Matthew 10:34 when he preached, "does not Christ say, 'I came not to send peace, but a sword'? What must you do with that sword? Only one thing if you wish to be the servants of God, and that is to drive out and destroy the evil ones who stand in the way of Gospel". Müntzer lead a peasants' army until its defeat by Imperial troops at the Battle of Frankenhausen on 15 May 1525.

Luther's own rebellion against the Pope and the Holy Roman Emperor were also inspirations for the peasants. Peasants sought to "wreak vengeance upon all their oppressors", and they related to Luther's appeals against the clergy and ideas about Christian freedom. The wealthy also sought to break the power of the clergy, escape the demands of Rome, and confiscate church property.

When pressure built around these revolutionary ideas, Luther had to choose a side. He joined with loyal burghers, nobility, and princes. He had long preached peaceful progress and passive resistance in documents like To the Christian Nobility of the German Nation (1520). Luther argued the Gospel did not need "force and bloodshed" to be defended, "The world was conquered by the Word, the Church is maintained by the Word, and the Word will also put the Church back into its own, and Antichrist, who gained his own without violence, will fall without violence".

Luther's support of nobility was also a recognition of the debt he owed to Frederick III, Elector of Saxony. His vicious turn against the peasants was seen as returning a favor. Nicolaus von Amsdorf reported that preachers began calling Luther a "flatterer of princes". He was even stoned in Orlamünde.

=== The Twelve Articles of the Christian Union of Upper Swabia ===
In February or March of 1525, Sebastian Lotzer and Christoph Schappeler summarized the views of the rebellion in a pamphlet called The Twelve Articles of the Christian Union of Upper Swabia. Though there were similar pamphlets, the Twelve Articles was so widely circulated it went through 25 printings. It served as a manifesto for the Peasants' War, summarizing their grievances with biblical references to support their beliefs:

1. The ability to elect their own pastors.
2. Tithes remaining within the community.
3. An end to serfdom, with a promise to obey elected and appointed rulers.
4. The right to fish or hunt without limitation.
5. The right to take wood as necessary.
6. Limitation on labour due to lords.
7. An end to traditional peasant services.
8. Reasonable rents paid to lords.
9. Fair judgements in legal cases.
10. Common lands returned to the peasants for common use.
11. An end to heriot
12. If any of these demands can be demonstrated to be unsupported by scripture, they are null and void.

The peasants wanted to hear the Gospel and live their lives accordingly, and those who could be considered enemies of the gospel were the enemies of the peasants. The idea of 'pure gospel' served as their justification.

== Luther's writings ==
By mid-April 1525, Luther had read the Twelve Articles. He decided to take the peasants up on the challenge of their twelfth article and offer contrasting readings of the Bible to refute their claims. They had made other direct pleas for Luther's intervention in documents like the constitution adopted by the Swabian peasants on 7 March 1525. It names Luther among several experts who they hoped would settle any theological disputes that arose during their attempts to live by divine law.

=== Admonition to Peace ===
Luther's primary objective was to prevent further bloodshed. He drafted the Admonition to Peace a Reply to the Twelve Articles of the Peasants in Swabia in Eisleben at the estate of Mansfeld chancellor Johann Dürr. It was published on 19 April 1525. The first section urges the princes and lords to recognize the threat that the peasants represented and "not to make light of this rebellion". He places blame for the rebellion squarely on the princes, "we have no one on earth to thank for this disastrous rebellion except you princes and lords...as temporal rulers you do nothing but cheat and rob the people so that you may lead a life of luxury and extravagance. The poor common people cannot bear it any longer".

Luther takes up the Twelve Articles in the second section. He acknowledges the peasants' demands are reasonable, but he condemns their use of force. He also dismantles their interpretation of the Gospel. The third section reproaches both sides:

"You lords, stop being so stubborn! You will finally have to stop being such oppressive tyrants-whether you want to or not. Give these poor people room in which to live and air to breathe. You peasants, let yourselves be instructed and give up the excessive demands of some of your articles. In this way it may be possible to reach a solution of this dispute through human laws and agreements, if not through Christian means."

=== Against the Murderous, Thieving Hordes of Peasants ===
Luther remained largely ignorant of the extent to which the unrest permeated the peasantry until he embarked on a tour of Thuringia with Philipp Melanchthon. It was at this time that he was able to observe firsthand the severity of the situation, peasants doing "the devil's work". On 4 May, Luther wrote to Johann Rühel, one of the councilors to Count Albrecht who was pursuing the rebels. He urged Albrecht to continue his campaign and wrote viciously about the rebels. It was in this spirit that he wrote Against the Rioting Peasants.

The pamphlet severely denounces the peasants on three charges: that they had violated oaths of loyalty, which makes them subject to secular punishment; they had committed crimes contrary to their faith; and that their crimes were committed using Christ's name which was blasphemy:

The peasants have taken upon themselves the burden of three terrible sins against God and man; by this they have merited death in body and soul ... they have sworn to be true and faithful, submissive and obedient, to their rulers ... now deliberately and violently breaking this oath ... they are starting a rebellion, and are violently robbing and plundering monasteries and castles which are not theirs ... they have doubly deserved death in body and soul as highwaymen and murderers ... they cloak this terrible and horrible sin with the gospel ... thus they become the worst blasphemers of God and slanderers of his holy name

Luther goes so far as to justify the actions of the princes against the peasants, even when it involves acts of violence. He feels that they can be punished by the lords on the basis that they have "become faithless, perjured, disobedient, rebellious, murderers, robbers, and blasphemers, whom even a heathen ruler has the right and authority to punish". He even venerates those who fight against the peasants, stating that "anyone who is killed fighting on the side of the rulers may be a true martyr in the eyes of God". He closes with a sort of disclaimer, "if anyone thinks this too harsh, let him remember that rebellion is intolerable and that the destruction of the world is to be expected every hour". One of the reasons why Luther urged that the secular authorities crush the peasant rebellion was because of St. Paul's teaching of the doctrine of divine right of kings in Romans 13:1–7, which says that all the authorities are appointed by God, and should not therefore be resisted.

=== Open Letter on the Harsh Book Against the Peasants ===
As Against the Peasants was published, Müntzer's forces were defeated, and he was captured. On 27 May, Thomas Müntzer confessed before his execution. Three days later, Luther wrote again to Johann Rühel and confided, "Well, whoever has seen Müntzer can say that he has seen the devil in the flesh in his greatest wrath. O Lord God, wherever such a spirit is in the peasants, how high time it is that they are strangled like mad dogs!" His pique had not subsided, even though the war was all but over.

The peasants felt betrayed by Luther's change of position between his two pamphlets. His support in Admonition had turned to vitriol mere weeks later. His friends urged him to retract Against the Peasants.

After a few months, he decided a formal explanation was required. He wrote An Open Letter on the Harsh Book Against the Peasants to the chancellor of Mansfeld Caspar Müller. He defends his previous writings, and states that it is the duty of a Christian to "suffer injustice, not to seize the sword and take to violence". He defends the 'harshness' that he used, stating that "a rebel is not worth rational arguments, for he does not accept them. You have to answer people like that with a fist, until the sweat drips off their noses". He also states that the princes were too severe in their punishment of the peasants and would be punished by God for their behaviour.
