= Heerhaufen =

Early Modern Central European paramilitary units

A Heerhaufen, also Heerhaufe, was the name given to unorganised or poorly organised paramilitary troops and auxiliaries in Central Europe during the Early Modern Period. The term is German and is sometimes translated "company" or "troops".

The term Haufe was used especially during the peasants' wars and Thirty Years' War for a body of men, sometimes of several thousand armed peasants or Landsknechten, more loosely organised than the smaller and strictly military units known as Fähnleins.

The German Youth Movement song "Wir sind des Geyers schwarze Haufen" ("We are Geyer's black Haufen") recalls the notion of the Haufen.

== See also ==
- Baltringer Haufen
- Schwarzer Haufen
