= Sebastian Lotzer =

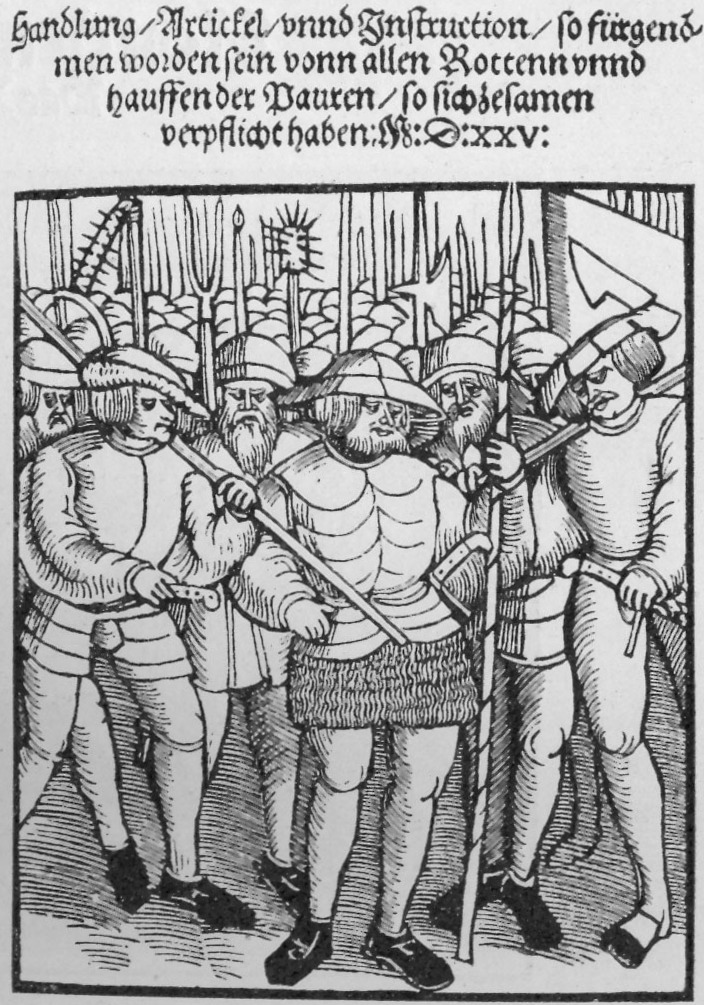
Pamphlet of the Twelve Articles from von 1525

Sebastian Lotzer (c. 1490 – after 1525) was born in Horb am Neckar. He was a furrier by trade. While in Memmingen as a wandering journeyman, he became secretary to the Baltringer Haufen, a peasant army during the German Peasants' War. Lotzer was heavily influenced by theologian Christoph Schappeler.

In 1525, representing the 27 villages of the territory of Memmingen, he drew up the Memmingen Articles, and shortly afterward, with the Christian Confederation, the Twelve Articles.

Following the defeat of the peasants by the Swabian League Lotzer had to flee from Memmingen in April 1525. He was last heard of in St. Gallen. His date of death is unknown.
