= Achstetten Castle =

Architectural Point of Interest

- Schloss Achstetten
- Achstetten
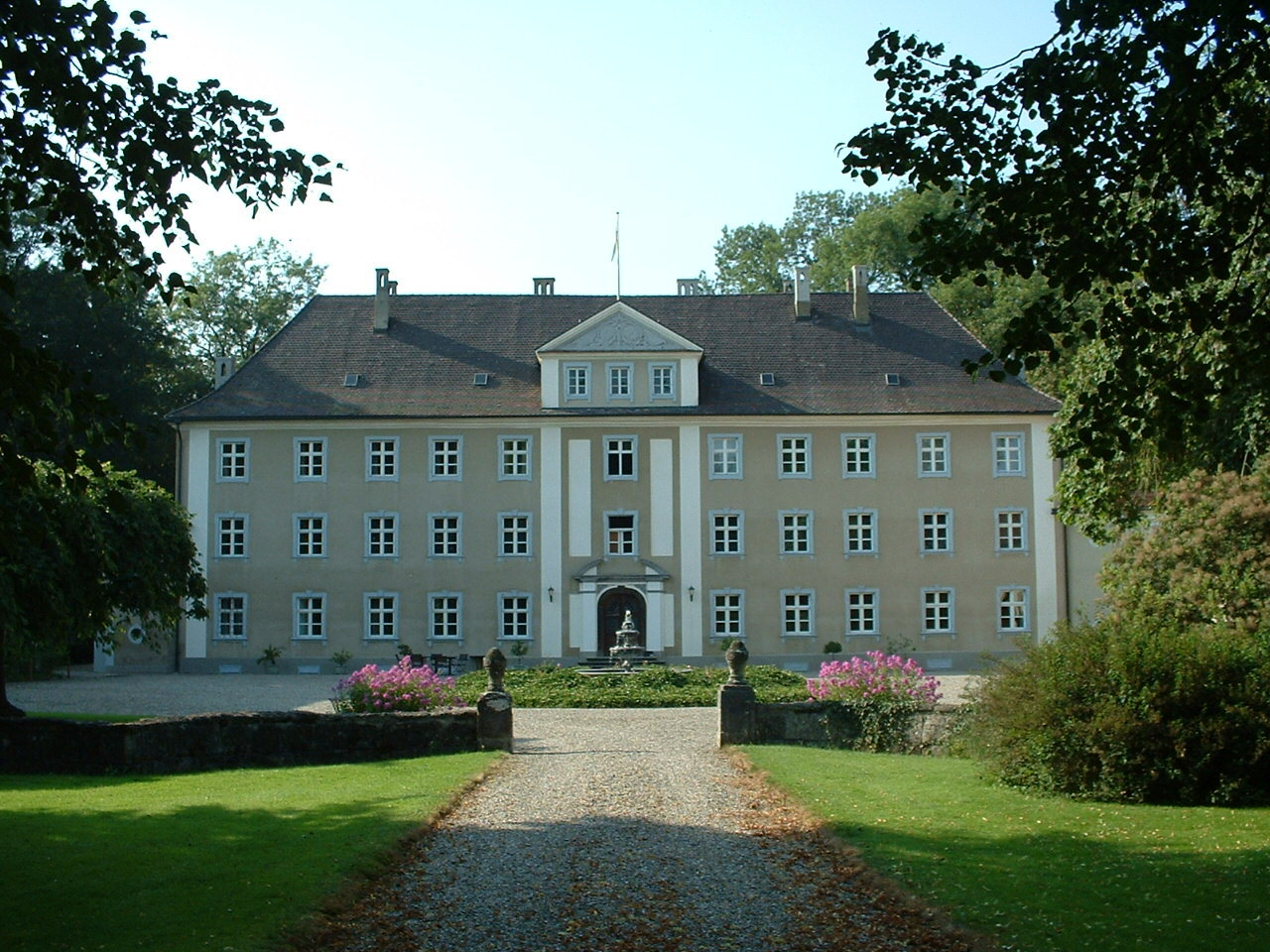

Site information
- Type: Mansion
- Code: DE-BW
- Open to the public: No

Location
- Coordinates: 48°15′30″N 9°53′51″E
- Height: 503 m above sea level (NN)

Site history
- Built: 1795–1797

Garrison information
- Occupants: Count Reuttner von Weyll

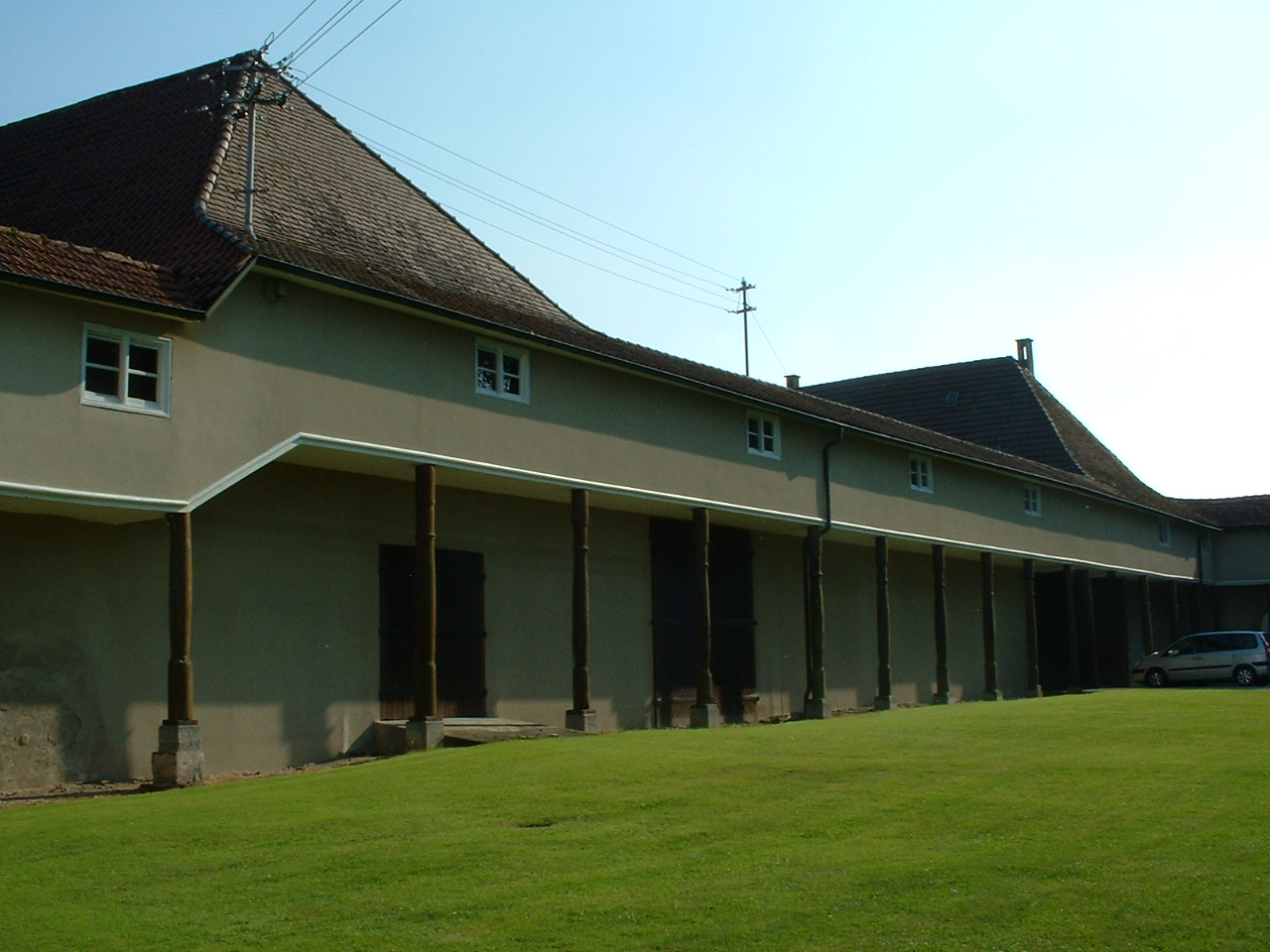
Achstetten Castle, passageway

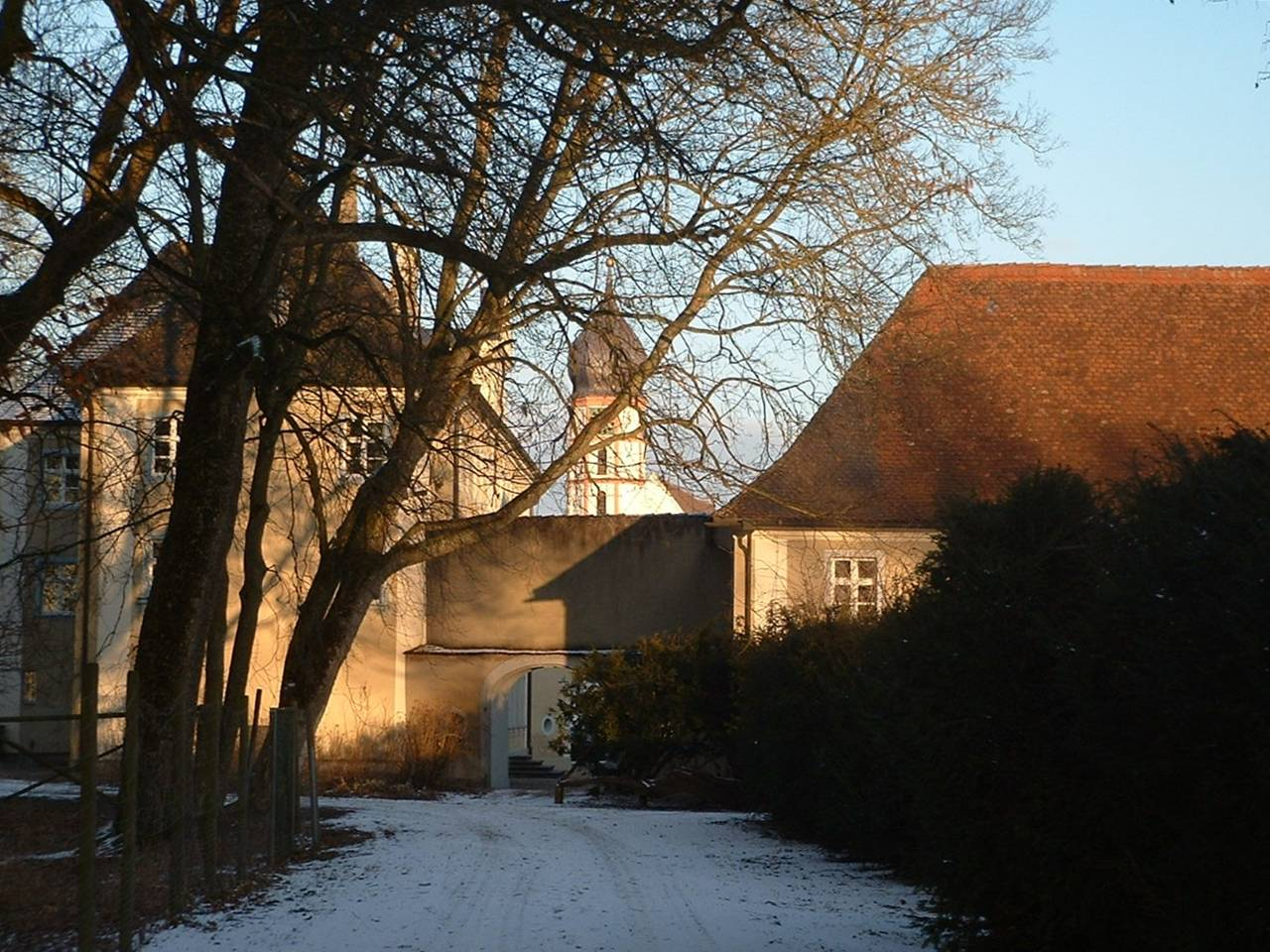
Achstetten Castle, southern entrance

Achstetten Castle is a classicist mansion in the southern German municipality of Achstetten in Upper Swabia.

== Location ==
Achstetten Castle is located at an elevation of about 503 m in the southern part of the municipality close to the parish church St Oswald and Agatha, the 18th-century country inn Rössle and the local town hall. The castle is situated on the edge of the valley of the river Rot to the east, and an elevated plain leading to the valley of the river Rottum to the west.

== Appearance ==
Achstetten Castle is a spacious three-storey building in classicist style with a risalit in its centre. Two wings are loosely attached to the main structure at a right angle. These two wings function as economy buildings. On three sides the castle is surrounded by a large park, which is home to an enclosure where fallow deer are kept. The main access to the castle is by a driveway measuring about 150 metres (490 ft) long. Noteworthy of the interior are a classicist staircase, 19th century furniture, an iron stove from 1798, portraits of the Freyberg family and a porcelain collection. A raised and roofed passageway on wooden pillars connects the castle to the nearby church. This passageway has a length of approximately 100 metres (330 ft). Passageways of this kind, which enabled the lord of the castle and his family to enter the church without being subject to the weather, were not uncommon; remnants of such a construction can also be seen at Großlaupheim Castle.

== History ==
A castle in Achstetten was first mentioned ion 1386. In a description dating from 1449, the castle is said to be a tall building, surrounded by moats and having two bridges. The castle was looted and burnt to the ground during the German Peasants' War in 1525 by members of the local peasant army, the Baltringer Haufe. A new castle was erected in 1583 which was described in 1620 by the visiting abbot of Ochsenhausen Abbey as a splendid palace.

By around 1750 it consisted of an inner yard, surrounded by a large building which contained the stables, a derelict barn and a gate on the ground floor, the granary in the attic and living quarters in between. To the left of the gate there was a prison building and the dairy whereas on the right hand side of the gate more stables for cattle and sheep were located. In the outer yard stood the building allocated to the Vogt as well as a barn. The castle and its gardens were surrounded by a tall hedge which functioned as a living wall.

The original castle was owned by the barons of Freyberg until 1639 after which time it changed hands several times before being bought by Baron Beat Conrad Reuttner von Weyl in 1795. He had the current castle built in 1794–1796. The architect was Franz Anton Bagnato. The building works started one year before the actual contract of sale was signed. Beat Conrad Reuttner von Weyl must therefore have been quite certain of his future acquisition. During the first half of the 19th century, the pond and the moats that surrounded the previous castle were drained and turned into a park. Most recently restoration works at the castle took place in 1982 and 1983. In 1996 a fountain, which already appeared in the original plans by Bagnato, was erected in the castle yard.

== Current use ==
Achstetten Castle and its estate are in the possession of the family Reuttner von Weyl who still reside at the castle. It is also home to the offices for the administration and the management of the estate. The castle is in private hands and not accessible to the public.

== See also ==
- List of castles in Baden-Württemberg
