= Maximilian Christof von Rodt =

German Roman Catholic prelate

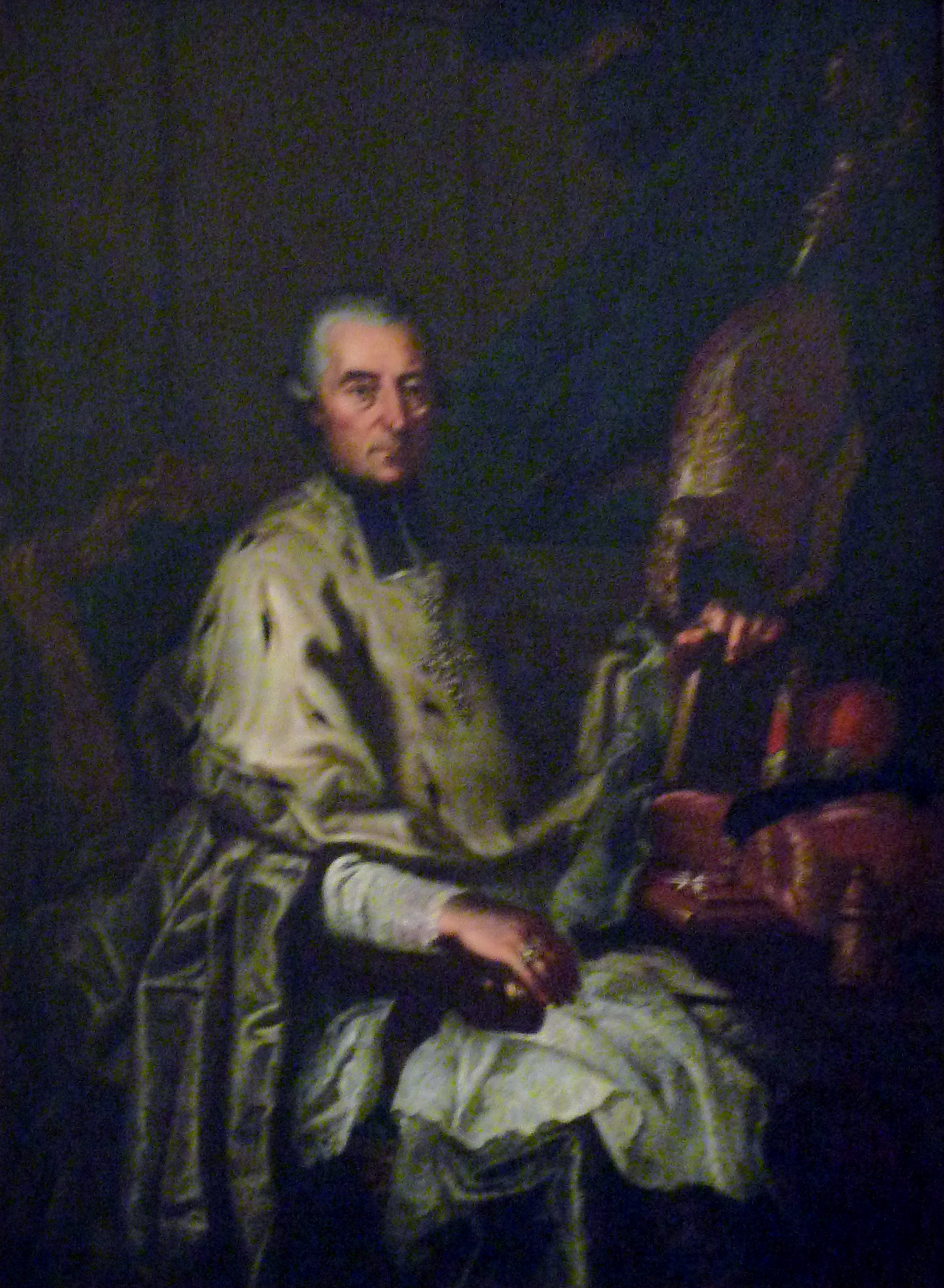
Maximilian Christoph von Rodt by Stephan Bildstein (ca. 1775/1780) in the Neue Schloss Meersburg

Maximilian Augustinus Christoph von Rodt or Maximilian Christian August Maria von Rodt (10 December 1717 - 17 January 1800) was a German Roman Catholic prelate who served as one of the last Prince-Bishoprics of Constance.

== Family ==
One brother Franz Konrad von Rodt was a cardinal and earlier prince-bishop of Konstanz, whilst another Christian von Rodt was a general. Their father Franz Christoph von Rodt (1671–1743) was a general and commander of the fortress of Burg Breisach, whilst their mother was Maria Theresia von Sickingen (1682–1756). Neither Franz junior nor Christian had children and so the family's male line died out with Maximilian - he had a daughter named Maria Katharina Maximiliana von Dort died on 16 March 1821 in Wald Abbey as choir sister M. Crescentia.

== Life ==
Born in Kehl, in 1727 he was made a Knight of the Sovereign Military Order of Malta. He later became a canon of Konstanz, Augsburg and Würzburg and studied from 1727 onwards in Freiburg and Siena. He became archdeacon of Konstanz Minster in 1760, then its cantor in 1766 and its provost in 1773. From 1770 to 1775 he was also dean of Augsburg Cathedral.

He was elected Prince Bishop on 14 December 1775 and this was confirmed by the pope on 15 April the following year. He was consecrated bishop on 12 August 1776. Like his brother's term of office, Maximilian's was marked by disputes with the Lucerne nunciature and with the major abbeys of Saint Gall, Einsiedeln and Kempten (the first two in his diocese, the third in Swabia). Joseph II's religious policy worsened the prince-bishopric's financial situation and threatened its continued existence. Ultimately Maximilian was replaced by Karl Theodor von Dalberg, co-adjutor and last prince-bishop of Constance.

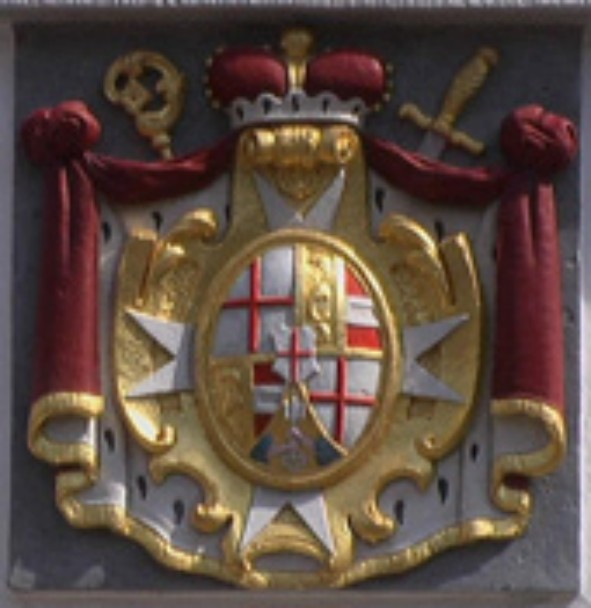
Maximilian Christoph von Rodt's coat of arms at the presbytery in Schleitheim, 1778

Maximilian was lord of Reichenau and Öhningen and the last owner of the fiefdoms of Bußmannshausen and Orsenhausen, bought in 1534 by his ancestor Hans von Rodt. Austria confiscated them in 1768 after the death of Maximilian's brother Christian but returned to the family after a protest by Franz Konrad. Maximilian assigned them to his nephew Bernhard von Hornstein-Göffingen.

In 1781 Maximilian published the Benedictionale Constantiense. He based himself in the Neues Schloss in Meersburg, built in 1710 by a predecessor as prince-bishop. He updated its furnishings and decoration, particularly with his collection of fossils (particularly mussels). It also included fossils from Öhningen (whose quarries remained in church hands until 1805), was seized by the state in 1806 and ultimately became part of the Museum für Naturkunde Karlsruhe. He died there and was buried in the choir of the parish church in the town, before being reinterred in a crypt near the door of its 1827-1829 replacement.

== Bibliography (in German) ==
- Julius Kindler von Knobloch und Othmar Freiherr von Stotzingen (Bearb.), Oberbadisches Geschlechterbuch. Hrsg. von der Badischen Historischen Kommission. Heidelberg: Carl Winter’s Universitätsbuchhandlung, Bd. 3: Art. „Freiherren von Rodt zu Bußmannshausen und Orsenhausen“, S. 547, 550–551.
- Otto Schmid (1889). "Rodt, Max Christoph" . Allgemeine Deutsche Biographie (in German). Vol. 29. Leipzig: Duncker & Humblot. p. 40.
- Rudolf Reinhardt (1990). "Maximilian Christoph von Rodt". Neue Deutsche Biographie (in German). Vol. 16. Berlin: Duncker & Humblot. pp. 506–507. (full text online).

Preceded by Franz Konrad von Rodt	Prince-Bishop of Constance; 1775–1799	Succeeded by Karl Theodor von Dalberg
