= Twelve Articles =

Declaration of Human Rights written in 1525 in Memmingen

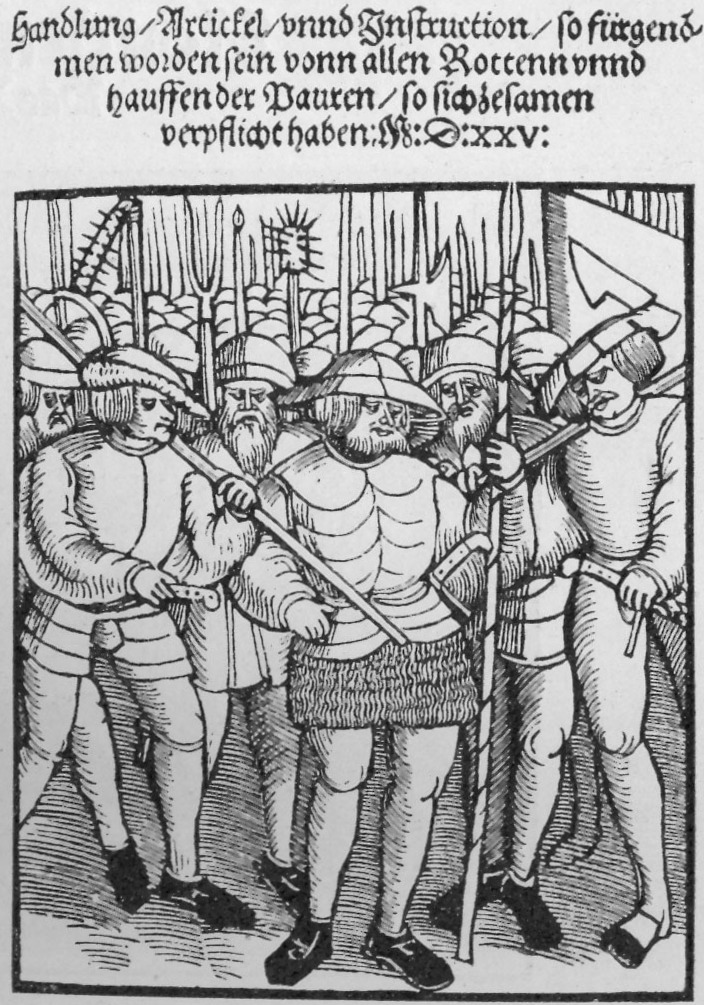
The Twelve Articles, leaflet (1525).

The Twelve Articles (German Zwölf Artikel) were part of the peasants' demands of the Swabian League during the German Peasants' War of 1525. They are considered the first draft of human rights and civil liberties in continental Europe after the Roman Empire. The gatherings in the process of drafting them are considered to be the first constituent assembly on German soil.

== Incidents ==
On 6 March 1525 about 50 representatives of the Upper Swabian Peasants Groups (of the Baltringer Haufen, the Allgäuer Haufen, and the Lake Constance Haufen), met in Memmingen to deliberate upon their common stance against the Swabian League. One day later and after difficult negotiations, they proclaimed the Christian Association, an Upper Swabian Peasants' Confederation. The peasants met again on 15 and 20 March 1525 in Memmingen and, after some additional deliberation, adopted the Twelve Articles and the Federal Order (Bundesordnung).

The Articles and the Order are only examples among many similar programmes developed during the German Peasants' War that were published in print. The Twelve Articles in particular were printed over 25,000 times within the next two months, a tremendous print run for the 16th century. Copies quickly spread throughout Germany. Since the two texts were not developed any further in the course of the German Peasants' War, some sources speak of the meeting in Memmingen as a constitutional peasant assembly.

== Summary of the Twelve Articles ==
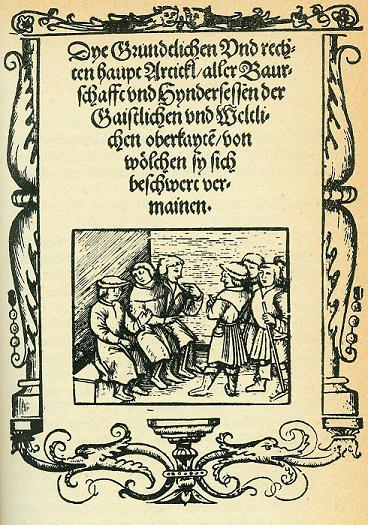
The title page of the Twelve Articles.

1. Every town and village shall be entitled to elect and to dismiss its preacher if he misbehaves. The preacher shall preach the gospel simply, straight and clear, without any human additions, for it is written that we can only attain God through true faith.

2. The preachers shall be paid from the great tithe. Any surplus shall be used to help the village poor and pay the war tax. The small tithe shall be abolished, for it was invented by humans, for the Lord, our God, created livestock free for mankind.

3. Until now it has been practice that we have been treated like serfs, which is deplorable, since Christ redeemed all of us with his precious blood, both the shepherd and the nobleman, with no exceptions. Accordingly we hereby declare that we are free and want to remain free.

4. It is unbrotherly and not in accordance with the word of God that the poor man is not entitled to hunt game or fowl, or to fish. Since when God our Lord created man, he gave him power over all beasts, the birds in the air and the fish in the water.

5. The nobles have taken sole possession of the forest. When the poor man needs something, he must buy it for twice its price. Consequently, all the forests that were not bought [meaning former community forests, which many rulers had simply appropriated] shall be returned to the village so that anybody can satisfy his needs therefrom for timber and firewood.

6. The excessive compulsory labour demanded of us, which grows from day to day, should be reduced to the amount that our parents used to perform, according to God's word.

7. The nobility shall not force us to perform more compulsory labour than was agreed upon [It was common for nobles to raise unilaterally the compulsory labour they demanded of their serfs].

8. Many fields cannot produce enough to pay the rent demanded for them. Honest men shall inspect these lands and set a fair amount of rent for them, so that farmers need not work for free, because each day's work deserves its pay.

9. New laws are constantly being made to impose new fines. Punishments are not being meted out depending on the offence but instead in an arbitrary fashion [raising fines and arbitrary judgments were common]. In our opinion we should be judged in accordance with the old written law, according to the case's merits, instead of on a whim.

10. Many [nobles] have appropriated meadows and fields belonging to the towns [commons, which were at the disposal of all townspeople]. We want them returned to all of us in common.

11. The “Todfall" [death duty (inheritance tax)] shall be abolished altogether and never again shall widows and orphans be shamefully robbed contrary to God and honour.

12. It is our decision and final opinion that if one or more of the articles listed herein contradict God's word ... we shall rescind them if it is explained to us on the basis of what is written. If any articles were already granted to us and it emerges afterwards that they were unjust, then they shall be null and void. Likewise, all this is subject to the condition that if additional articles are found here written that are against God and a grievance by some other person.

== The Federal Order (Bundesordnung) ==
The Federal Order reached high print run as well and was probably particularly popular with the peasants, since it provided a model for a federal social order based on the municipality. Peasants’ communities were found to have been organised pursuant to this in the Black Forest, the Alsace and in Franconia.

== Roots of the Twelve Articles ==
The roots of the Twelve Articles are usually traced to the journeyman furrier and lay preacher Sebastian Lotzer of Memmingen, who is believed to have drafted the text between 27 February and 1 March 1525. The town’s reformer Christoph Schappeler is generally credited with writing the preamble and providing theological justification.

Before the drafting of the Articles, about twenty-five villages around Memmingen had already presented grievances concerning peonage, land use restrictions, forest rights, and ecclesiastical tithes. These local complaints may have formed the basis for Lotzer’s synthesis of demands.

Earlier movements may also have left an imprint. Historians note similarities between the Twelve Articles and demands raised by Joß Fritz during the Bundschuh uprisings of 1513.

== Martin Luther and the Twelve Articles ==
The peasants had to burden the many encumbrances they were charged with and in Martin Luther's and the German Reformation's stance they saw the affirmation that most of those were not provided for by the will of God.

Luther was unhappy, however, with the peasants’ revolts and their invoking him. Possibly he also saw their potentially negative effect upon the Reformation as a whole. He called upon the peasants and urged them to keep peace. He also wrote to the gentry, however:

“They set up twelve articles, some are which are so just that they bring shame to you before God and world. But almost all of them are in their favour and not drawn up to the best. […] But it is unbearable to tax and slave-drive people like this forever.”

In May 1525 Luther's script "Against the Murderous, Thieving Hordes of Peasants" appeared, in which he openly sided with the German nobility and, fearing for the godly order, called for the peasant rebels’ complete destruction. Luther's decision was specifically provoked by the so-called “Weinsberger Bluttat”: in which peasant rebels under Jäcklein Rohrbach had killed the High Governor, Ludwig Helferich Count von Helfenstein and massacred his followers, after having seized the city and the castle.

== Continued effect ==
The fundamental ideas laid down in these demands seems to have lasted longer than their main fighters and representatives.

A direct comparison with the American Declaration of Independence of 1776 yields some equivalence in the motives and the implementation into the text. The results of the French Revolution starting in 1789 in the form of a modern state, that is a republic, sees quite some of the peasants’ points implemented.

In the following 300 years the peasants rarely rebelled. The Revolution of March 1848/49 (Märzrevolution), again saw the peasants raise some of the same demands they had already raised in 1525. However, urban and liberal classes were the main "voices" of the Revolution in institutions like the Paulskirche Assembly and in the end only some of the peasants' demands were taken up by the revolutionary leadership, let alone implemented in the long term.

The Second Vatican Council of 1965 defined the “supreme principle” of the reform on the liturgy to allow for the “conscious, active and comprehensive participation of the believers” in the liturgy of the church. In this context, Cardinal Annibale Bugnini created the Mass of Paul VI, which was to be said in the respective vernacular, rather than in the Ecclesiastical Latin liturgical language like the Tridentine Mass. The controversy over this alteration, however, still continues more than half a century later.

== Literature ==
- Günther Franz: Die Entstehung der "Zwölf Artikel" der deutschen Bauernschaft, in: Archiv für Reformationsgeschichte 36 (1939), S. 195-213.
- Peter Blickle: Nochmals zur Entstehung der Zwölf Artikel, in: Ders. (Hrsg.), Bauer, Reich, Reformation. Festschrift für Günther Franz zum 80. Geburtstag, Stuttgart 1982, S. 286-308.
- Ders.: Die Revolution von 1525, München 31993. ISBN 3-486-44263-5
- Ders.: Die Geschichte der Stadt Memmingen. Von den Anfängen bis zum Ende der Reichsstadt, Stuttgart 1997. ISBN 3-8062-1315-1
- Martin Brecht: Der theologische Hintergrund der Zwölf Artikel der Bauernschaft in Schwaben von 1525. Christoph Schappelers und Sebastian Lotzers Beitrag zum Bauernkrieg, in: Heiko A. Obermann (Hrsg.), Deutscher Bauernkrieg 1525 (Zeitschrift für Kirchengeschichte 85, 1974, Heft 2) 1974, S. 30-64 (178-208).
- Oman, C. W. C. "The German Peasant War of 1525." The English Historical Review 5, no. 17 (1890): 65-94. . (includes English text of the Twelve Articles)
- Sea, Thomas F. "The German Princes' Responses to the Peasants' Revolt of 1525." Central European History 40, no. 2 (2007): 219-40. .
- Günter Vogler: Der revolutionäre Gehalt und die räumliche Verbreitung der oberschwäbischen Zwölf Artikel, in: Peter Blickle (Hrsg.), Revolte und Revolution in Europa, Historische Zeitschrift (Beiheft 4 NF), München 1975, S. 206-231.
- Ernst Walder: Der politische Gehalt der Zwölf Artikel der deutschen Bauernschaft von 1525, in: Schweizer Beiträge zur Allgemeinen Geschichte 12 (1954), S. 5-22.
