= Franz Konrad von Rodt =

18th-century German Cardinal

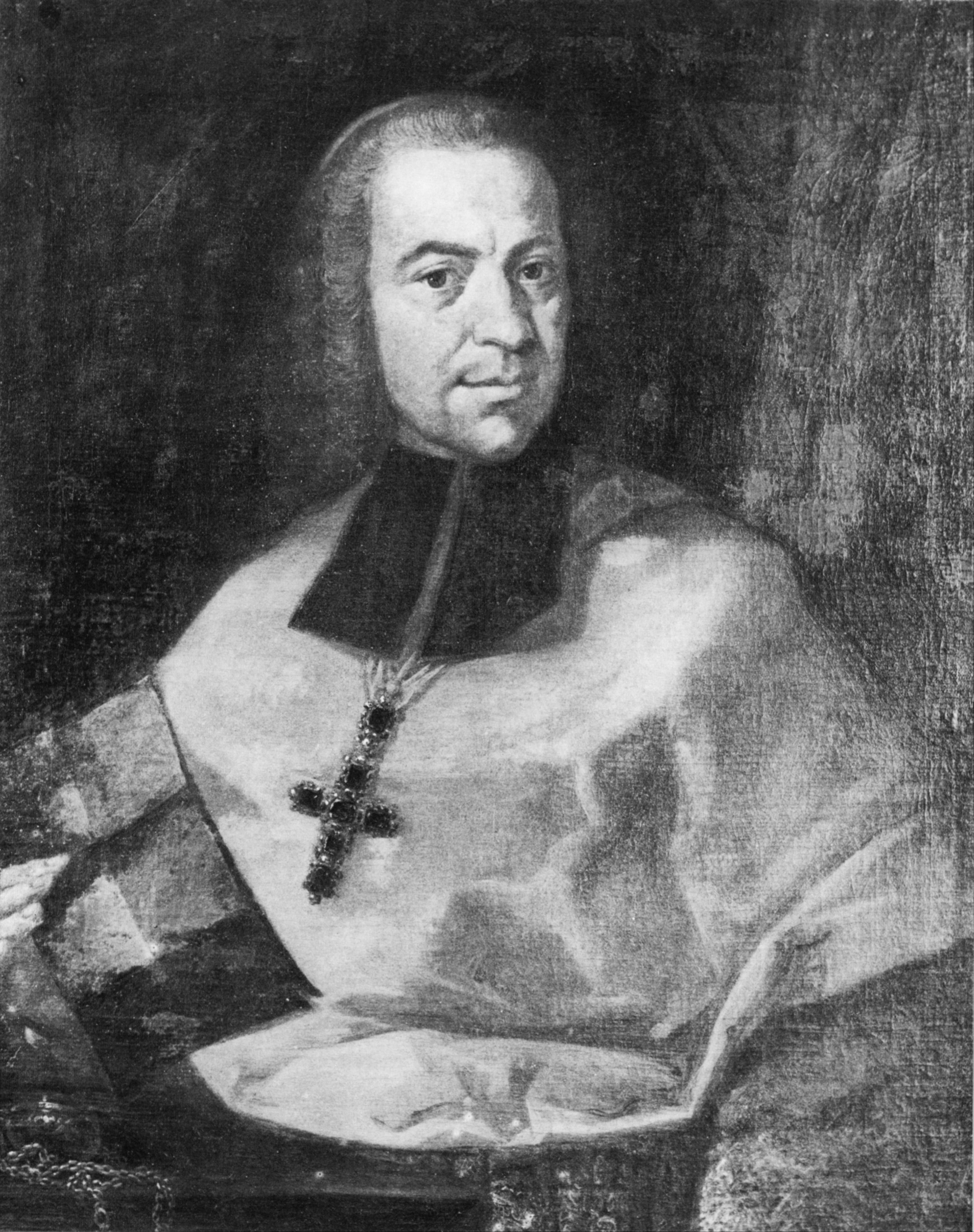
Portrait of Franz Konrad von Rodt by Angelica Kauffmann.

Franz Konrad Casimir Ignaz von Rodt, (Meersburg, Lake Constance, 10 March 1706 - Meersburg, 16 October 1775) was an 18th-century German Cardinal.

== Biography ==
His father was General and Breisach fortress commander Franz Christoph von Rodt (1671–1743). Von Rodt was elected Bishop of Constance in 1750, succeeding his maternal uncle, Kasimir Anton von Sickingen. One of his successors was his brother Maximilian Christof von Rodt.

Pope Benedict XIV created him a cardinal in the consistory of 5 April 1756. On 2 August 1758, he became Cardinal Priest of the Titular Church of Santa Maria del Popolo.

Von Rodt participated in the conclave of 1758, in which Clement XIII was elected, but he did not participate in the conclaves of 1769 (election of Clement XIV) and 1774-1775 (election of Pius VI).

Franz Konrad von Rodt died in 1775 of a stroke in his Bishop's residence, the Neues Schloss in Meersburg and was buried in the choir of its Catholic parish church.

== See also ==
- Cardinals created by Benedict XIV
- Prince-Bishopric of Constance

== Sources ==
- Franz Konrad von Rodt, on hls-dhs-dss.ch, Dizionario storico della Svizzera.
- David M. Cheney, Franz Konrad von Rodt, in Catholic Hierarchy.
- Salvador Miranda, RODT, Franz Konrad Kasimir Ignaz von, on fiu.edu – The Cardinals of the Holy Roman Church, Florida International University
