= Neues Schloss (Meersburg) =

Coordinates: 47°41′37″N 9°16′20″E

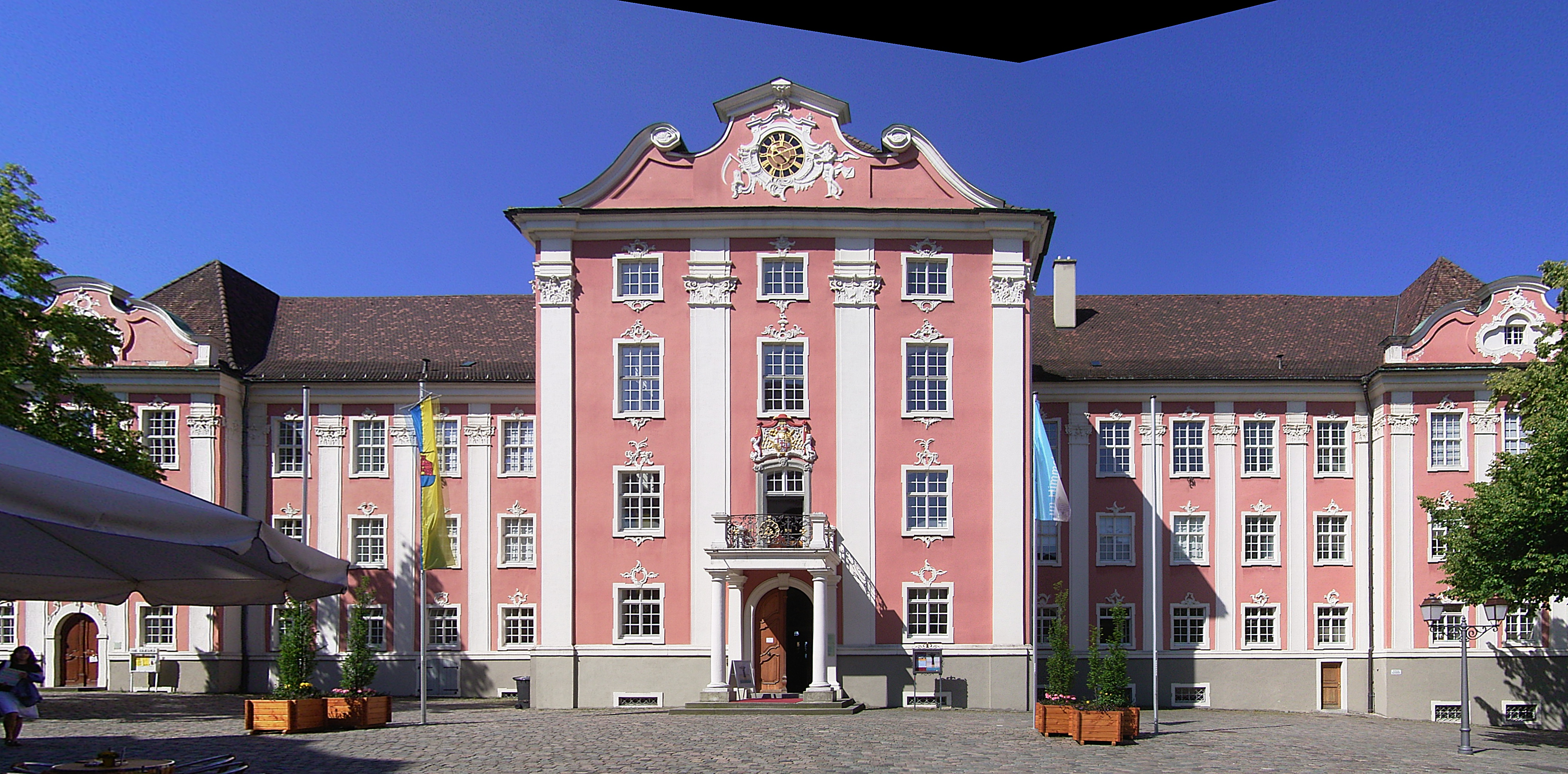
Entrance to the Neues Schloss (New Castle) in Meersburg

The Neues Schloss Meersburg (New Castle in Meersburg) is located in Meersburg near Lake Constance in Baden-Württemberg, Germany. From its construction in 1750 until the bishopric was dissolved in 1803 it was the seat of the Prince-Bishop of Constance.

== History ==
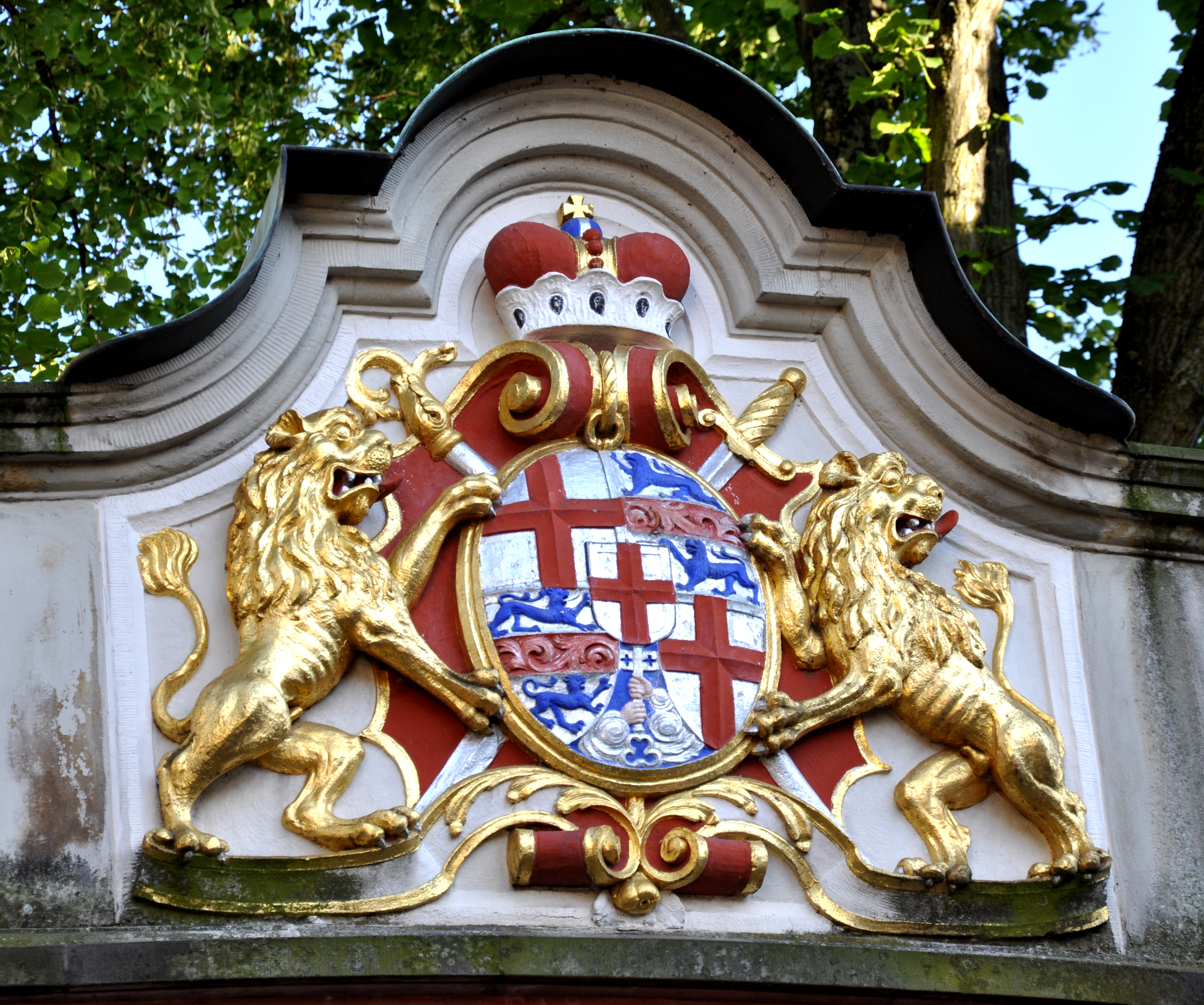
Coat of Arms of Johann Franz II von Stauffenberg

Construction began in 1710 under Bishop Johann Franz II. von Stauffenberg, with Christoph Gessinger designing and supervising the work. It would be two years later in 1712 that the project was finished. The building was, however, a bit unfinished as a symbol of the power of the bishop. The upper story contained a number of apartments for visiting nobles and church leaders as the residence of a Prince-Bishop should, but it lacked a grand staircase and other trappings of wealth and power.

When Hugo Damian von Schönborn, who was already Bishop of Speyer and had already built Schloss Bruchsal there, took over the seat at Meersburg in 1740 he wanted to improve the Neues Schloss. He brought in the master builder Johann Georg Stahl from Bruchsal to turn the Schloss into a more impressive and elegant building. Following plans from Balthasar Neumann, Johann built an impressive staircase and decorated the castle.

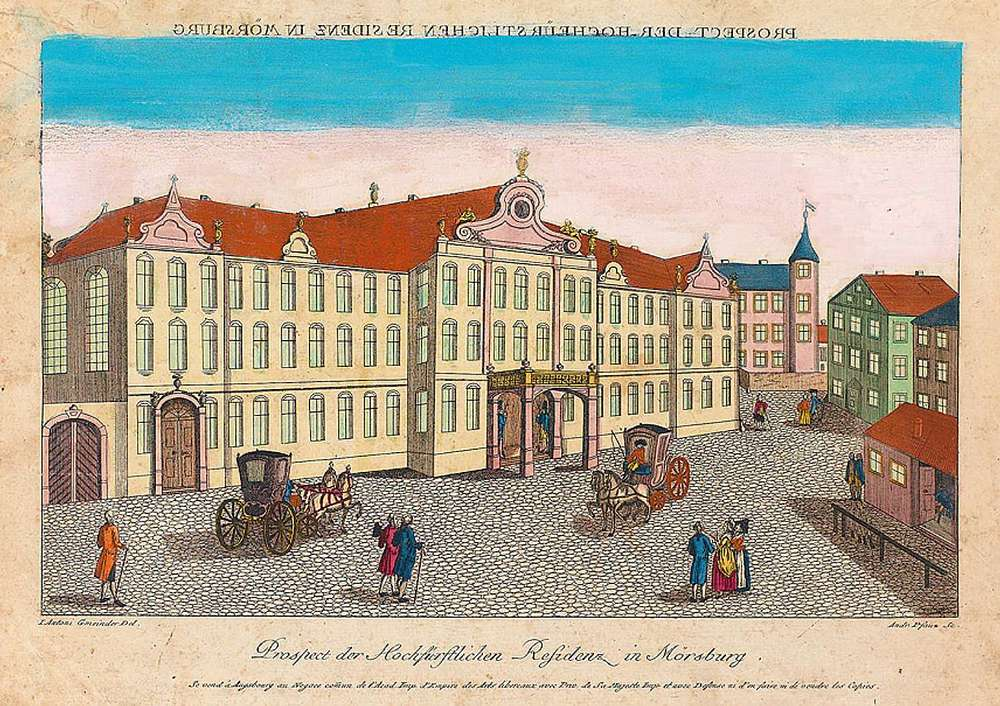
Postcard of the Neues Schloss Meersburg from around 1700

From 1741 until 1743 the castle chapel was added, based on plans from Balthasar Neumann. The art and statues are the work of the fresco painter Gottfried Bernhard Göz from Augsburg (1708–1774) and the sculptor Joseph Anton Feuchtmayer (1696–1770).

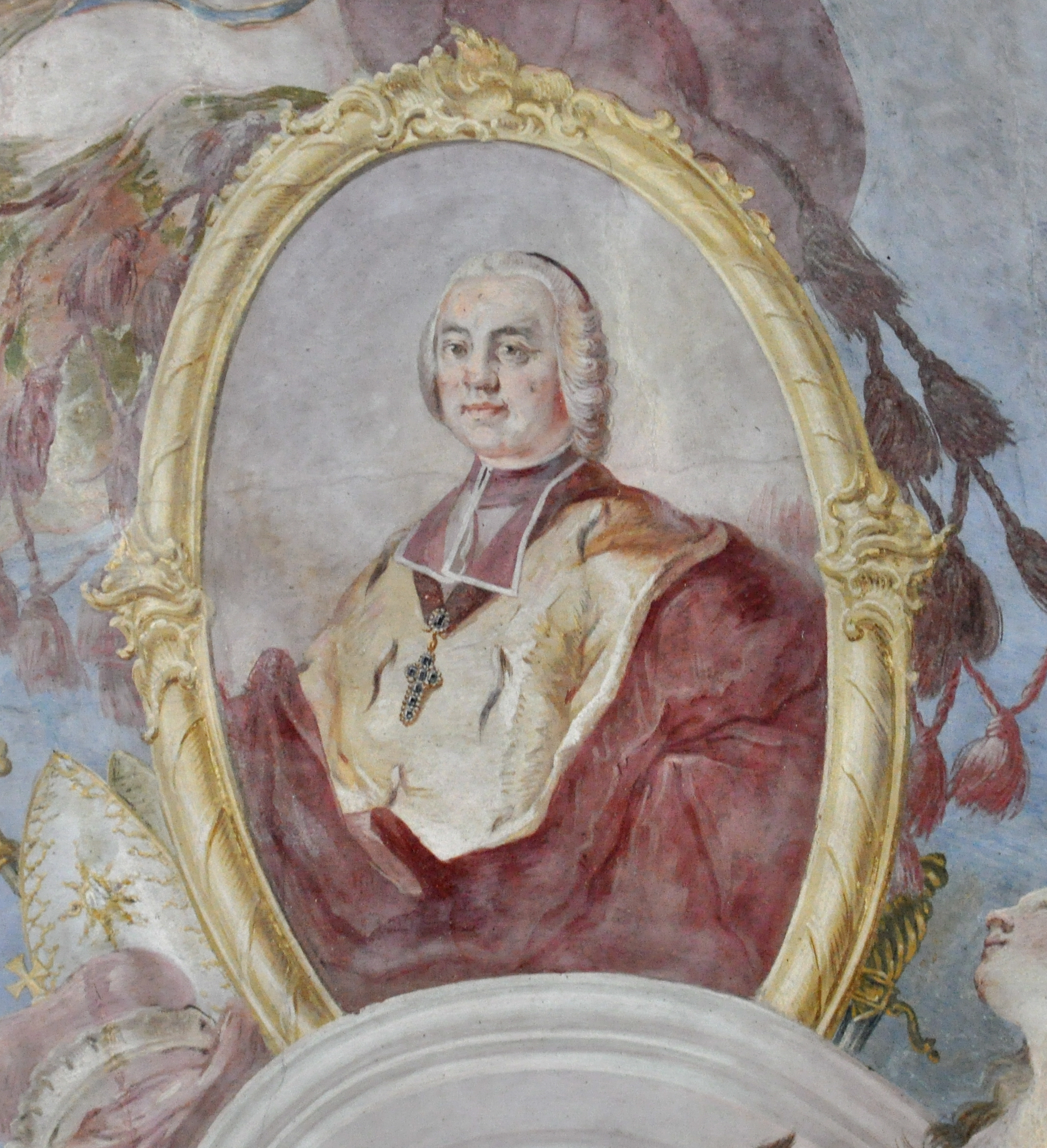
Prince-Bishop Cardinal Franz Konrad von Rodt

By 1759 the Prince-Bishop Cardinal Franz Konrad von Rodt had the castle renovated under the direction of the master builder Franz Anton Bagnatos. The already dilapidated stairway had to be restored. The baroque facade of the castle was redone in the Rococo style, with enlarged windows, additional decoration around the windows and new gables.

The interior decoration is the work of the Mainz artist Giuseppe Appiani (c. 1705–1786) and the sculptor Carlo Luca Pozzi (1735–1803). Among the paintings by Appiani are two enormous paintings over the Grand Staircase Verherrlichung des Fürstbischofs und des Hochstift (English:Glorification of the Prince-Bishops and the Diocese) from 1761 and over the ballroom Die Verehrung der göttlichen Vorsehun (English: The worship of the divine providence) from 1762.

Due to the Secularization in 1803, the Neues Schloss was the seat of the Prince-Bishops of Constance for only about 50 years.

During the 19th century and until 1955 the Schloss served as a school for girls, a local prison, a sailors' school, a secondary school and from 1865 to 1937 as the Baden Institution for Deaf-mutes, which moved to Gengenbach after 1937.

Following World War II it was used as barracks for French troops.

== Museums ==
Today the castle is home to several museums. In addition to the Town Gallery (Städtische Galerie) and the Dornier Museum, which take up the 2nd floor, the New Palace is also home to the Palace Museum of the Prince Bishops (Fürstbischöfliche Schlossmuseum) on the 3rd floor. It offers the opportunity to view the residential and representation rooms of the prince bishops refurnished with contemporary appointments from that age.

== Castle location ==
The castle is located on a hill over the Lake Constance. In the rear of the castle is a garden terrace with an excellent view of the lower city, the ferry port and the Swiss coast of Lake Constance. Access to the terrace is on the ground floor of the castle or through a staircase located near the bridge to the Burg Meersburg, which is closed by a wrought iron gate.

On the city side there is a large plaza, the Schlossplatz. In the middle of the castle facade, there is a large clock with the god of time, Chronos. On the left side of the castle is the entrance to the castle chapel which is currently used by the Evangelical Church in Baden.

== See also ==
- List of castles in Baden-Württemberg
- Meersburg
- Little House, Meersburg
