= Christoph Schappeler =

German religious figure, reformer, and preacher

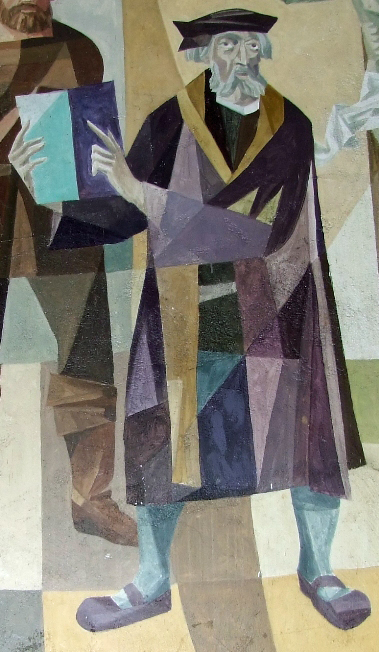
Christoph Schappeler.

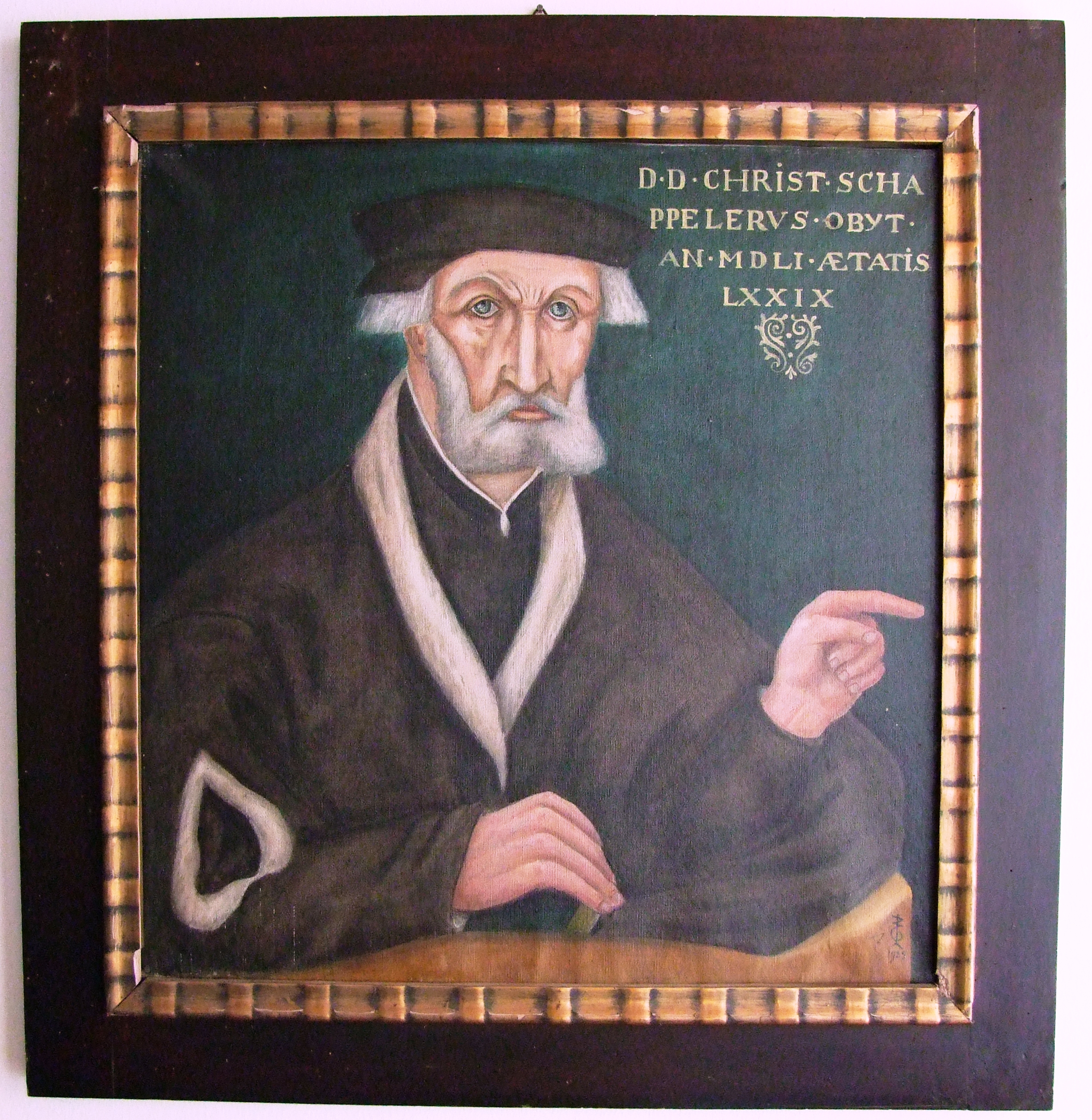
Christoph Schappeler.

Christoph Schappeler (1472 – August 25, 1551) was a German religious figure, reformer, and a preacher at St. Martin's in Memmingen during the early 16th century and during the Protestant Reformation and the German Peasants' War. He tended to side with the poor, causing the senate to regulate his sermons in 1516. However, by 1521 the climate had changed such that the senate was giving him support. When he was excommunicated in 1524, the Senate refused to follow the bishop's order to have him banished.

It is believed that Schappeler and Sebastian Lotzer wrote The Twelve Articles: The Just and Fundamental Articles of All the Peasantry and Tenants of Spiritual and Temporal Powers by Whom They Think Themselves Oppressed in early 1525. Within two months of its initial publication in Memmingen, twenty-five thousand copies of the Twelve Articles had spread throughout Europe. The Twelve Articles was a religious petition that utilized both Zwingli's and Luther's ideas to appeal for peasants' rights.
