= Lehrerleut =

Branch of the Hutterite denomination

The Lehrerleut, also Lehrerleit, are a branch of the Hutterites that emerged in 1877. They are the most traditional branch of the Hutterites.

== History ==
Thirteen Hutterite families under the leadership of Jacob Wipf (1835–1896) emigrated from Johannesruh, Ukraine, to South Dakota in 1877. After their arrival, they formed the Lehrerleut by establishing a community of goods at Elmspring Colony near Parkston, South Dakota, thus following the example of the Schmiedeleut and the Dariusleut. The group's leader was a teacher (German: Lehrer), hence their name Lehrerleut ("teacher people").

Shortly after World War I, two Hutterite conscientious objectors from the Lehrerleut branch, Joseph and Michael Hofer, died in an American prison. This and growing anti-German sentiment caused the emigration of all four Lehrerleut colonies to Alberta, Canada, in the following years. In 1945, the Lehrerleut started to form new colonies in Montana, thus returning to the United States.

== Demography ==
In 1957 there were a total of 31 Lehrerleut colonies. 20 in Alberta, 3 in Saskatchewan and 8 in Montana. In 1973 the total number rose to 61. According to the "2004 Hutterite Phone Book" there were 69 Lehrerleut colonies in Alberta and 30 in Saskatchewan. An additional 44 colonies were in Montana, all together 143. Rod Janzen and Max Stanton report in their book of 2010 that there were 139 Lehrerleut colonies, 72 in Alberta, 32 Saskatchewan and 35 in Montana.
