= Prairieleut =

Former branch of the Hutterites

The Prairieleut, also written Prärieleut and sometimes also called Prairie People, were a branch of the Hutterite tradition from the immigration of the Hutterites to the United States in the 1870s until the about the middle of the 20th century, when they had almost totally assimilated into Mennonite congregations, especially into the Krimmer Mennonite Brethren or into mainstream society. The Prairieleut did not live in colonies, with community of goods, but on individual farms, mostly homesteads on South Dakota grasslands. During the 20th century the Prairieleut mostly lost their distinctive language Hutterisch.

According to the United States Census in 1880 there were 822 Prairieleut.

== See also ==
- Anabaptist settler colonialism

== Literature ==
- Rod A. Janzen: The Prairie People: Forgotten Anabaptists, Hanover, NH, 1999.
- Rod A. Janzen: Paul Tschetter: The Story of a Hutterite Immigrant Leader, Pioneer, and Pastor, Eugene, OR, 2009.
- John A. Hostetler: Hutterite Society, Baltimore, MD, 1974.
