= Owa Hutterite Colony =

Hutterite colony based in Owa, Japan

Ōwa Hutterite Colony 大輪
- Hutterite Colony
- Location within Japan
- Coordinates: 36.9035°N 140.1362°E
- Country: Japan
- Prefecture: Tochigi
- Branch: Dariusleut
- Status: Defunct (as of December 31, 2019)
- Founded: 1972

Population
  - Total: 0

The Christian Community of New Hutterian Brethren at Ōwa (大輪) was a Hutterite colony of the Dariusleut branch in Japan. It was located near Ōwa village in Nasu District, Tochigi. It existed from 1972 to the end of 2019. The members of the colony were ethnic Japanese.

== History ==
=== Background ===
Buddhists have a long tradition of communal living, and there are several Buddhist communities in Japan. Therefore, the idea of communal living was not totally uncommon for Japanese Christians. The founders of Ōwa Colony wanted to establish communal living modeled after the Buddhist Ittoen (一燈園) commune, but based on Christian principles.

In the 1950s, the United Church of Christ, led by Izeki Isomi, began communal living in Kōriyama. Lacking an organisational model, the Church studied kibbutzim in Israel, but abandoned this model of structure for that of the North American Hutterites, who they established contact with through the Dariusleut Wilson Siding Colony near Lethbridge, Alberta. The Church quickly adopted many aspects of the Hutterite way of life, including their European-style dress, which briefly became fashionable within the city of Kōriyama following its adoption by the Church.

In 1972, the Church decided to move out of Kōriyama's urban environment in order to further develop its Hutterite principles. The Ōwa Colony proper was founded, with the group establishing the colony on six acres of land under the leadership of Izeki and with the financial assistance of the Wilson Colony in Alberta.

=== Ōwa Colony ===
The colony developed a broad base of agricultural activities, growing twenty different crops including wheat, soy beans, potatoes, apples, raspberries and carrots, for both commercial and their own use; as a result, the colony was effectively self-sufficient. The colony also produced bread, plum wine and has a fresh water spring providing access to potable water year round. During the 1970s, the colony accepted contract work assembling television components, but discontinued this practice by 1977 because of the imposed deadlines interfering with colony life.

The 1970s saw the fostering of strong ties between Ōwa and Canadian Hutterite colonies, with exchanged letters being published in Ōwa's biweekly journal, Budō-en (Vineyard). Izeki and other colonists made repeated trips to the Wilson Colony in Alberta to learn more about the Hutterite way of life, with Izeki and his wife being baptized there in 1975 in a Japanese-language ceremony. Following Izeki's ordination as a minister in 1977, the remainder of the Ōwa colonists could be baptized in Japan. By 1977, the possibility of joining the Japanese and Canadian Hutterite communities in marriage was under consideration, with the young colonist Watanabe Masako being tipped to marry a Canadian Hutterite who would eventually take over the Ōwa Colony was discussed. Though nothing came of this proposal, Watanabe increasingly became the go-between for the Canadian and Japanese Hutterites, even learning German for this purpose.

Izeki died in 1983 of a brain hemorrhage during the reconstruction of Ōwa's church, with Kikuta Fumio taking over as his successor.

== Doctrine ==
In the early days, there was greater adherence to conservative Dariusleut doctrine, with colonists living an austere lifestyle – this was often learned firsthand, as many founding Ōwa members lived for extended periods in Hutterite colonies in North America, including Wilson Colony. This caused some friction, with member Katizum Tamura pushing for a more modernistic approach to life, against the inclinations of the conservative First Minister Reverend Izeki. This eventually lead to Tamura and his family leaving the colony with his wife and three children.

Despite this, by 2009 a less strict lifestyle had steadily been adopted, more reminiscent of the liberal Schmiedeleut Hutterite branch than the founding conservative Dariusleut tradition; this is reflected in the organizational structure, and also personal choices such as the wearing of wristwatches, the discarding of traditional Hutterite headgear for both men and women, and women's wearing of trousers for work – something which would be unthinkable in North American Hutterite colonies. This has been speculated to be a consequence of the Colony's gender imbalance, which heavily favors women.

In some areas, however, the Ōwa Colony's lifestyle significantly deviated even from the most liberal trends of some North American Hutterite colonies. For example, public access to a television and DVD player for all members, church services being held only once a week instead of once a day, and sending children to a local school instead of educating them on the colony, which has been described as "The greatest difference between Ōwa Colony and the North American colonies".

== Population ==
Historical population
Year	Pop.	±%
1971	19	—
1981	30	+57.9%
1985	22	−26.7%
1986	25	+13.6%
1989	24	−4.0%
2010	7	−70.8%
2014	5	−28.6%

In 1971 the group that would form Ōwa Colony had 19 members (4 men, 11 women and 4 children). The population would peak in 1981 with about thirty members, from where it steadily declined. Despite early hopes of establishing a self-sustaining population, children born into the Ōwa Colony later married outside the community and left. Some of these adults born into the Colony still continued as members of the Hutterite Church, and occasionally contributed labour, remaining in contact with their families on the Colony, but do not live communally themselves. By 2010 there were 9 members (7 still living in the community), mostly elderly people. The demographic outlook of the Ōwa Colony has been described as "grim", and "destined for extinction", mirroring a nationwide Japanese trend of low fertility and an aging population. After the death of Rev. Fumio "Joseph" Kikuta, his wife Yukio became the last spokesperson of the community. Eventually Ōwa Colony was disbanded on December 31, 2019.

== Literature ==
- Shimazaki, Hiroshi Tanaka: The Emergence of Japanese Hutterites, Japan Review, 2000, 12, pages 145–164.
- Lehr, John C.: Owa: a Dariusleut Hutterite colony in Japan in Prairie Perspectives: Geographical Essays (Vol: 13), Winnipeg 2010, pages 30–38.
