= Community Farm of the Brethren =

Christian community in Bright, Ontario

The Community Farm of the Brethren, also called Juliusleut, is a Christian community with communal living at Bright, Ontario. It was in fellowship with the Hutterites from its beginning in 1941 until 1950.

The Community Farm of the Brethren was created under the leadership of Julius Kubassek (1893-1961), an immigrant from Hungary, who came to North America in 1925. Kubassek visited the Hutterites in Alberta in 1936. Kubassek and a group of his followers moved to West Raley Hutterite Colony and lived there for more than a year. In 1939 the group left, because some differences between Kubassek group and the original members of the Hutterite colony. Nonetheless, the Hutterites supplied Kubassek and his group with three railroad cars of farm implements and animals. The group then went to a rented farm in Glen Morris, Ontario. In April 1941 they relocated to a purchased farm in Bright, Ontario, and called themselves "Community Farm of the Brethren".

== Literature ==
- John A. Hostetler: Hutterite Society, Baltimore, MD, 1974.
- Rod Janzen and Max Stanton: The Hutterites in North America, Baltimore, MD, 2010.
