= Schmiedeleut =

Denomination of Hutterites

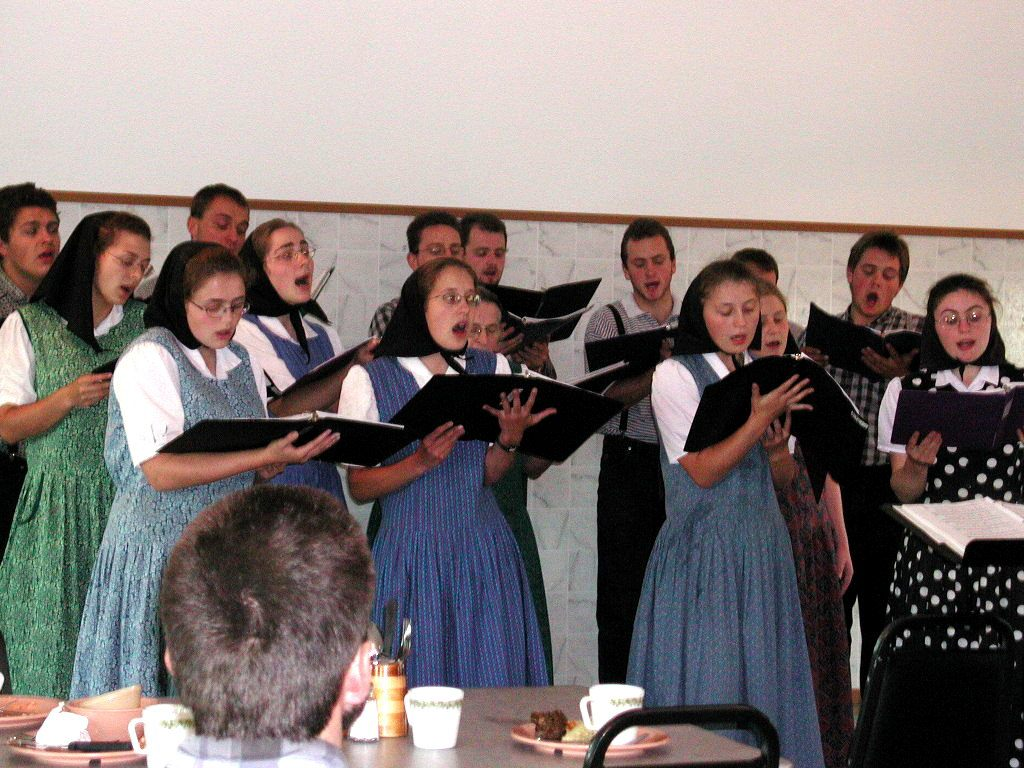
Schmiedeleut Hutterites singing

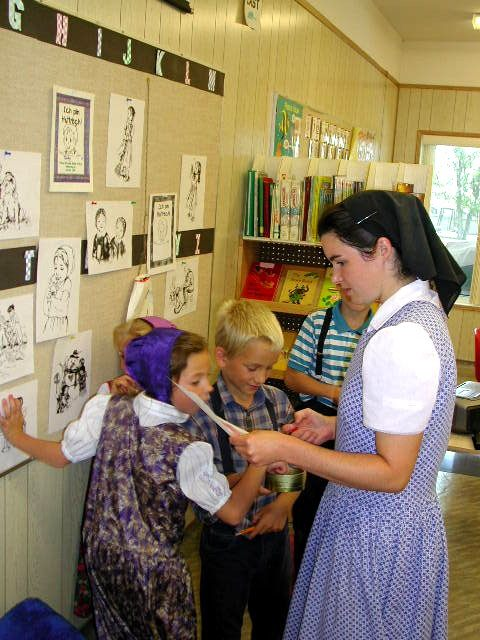
Schmiedeleut Hutterites at school in Crystal Springs Colony, Manitoba, Canada

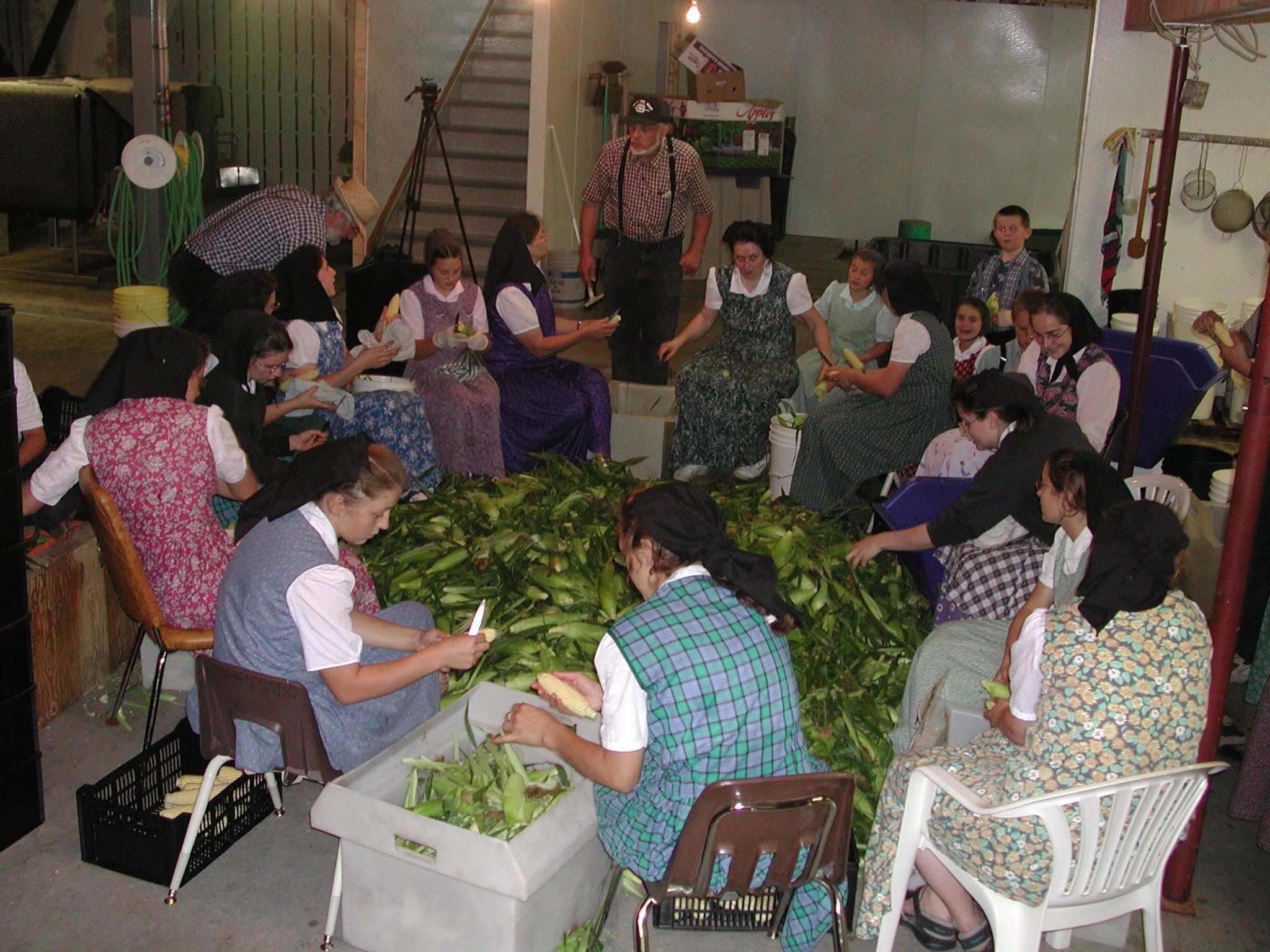
Schmiedeleut Hutterites at work

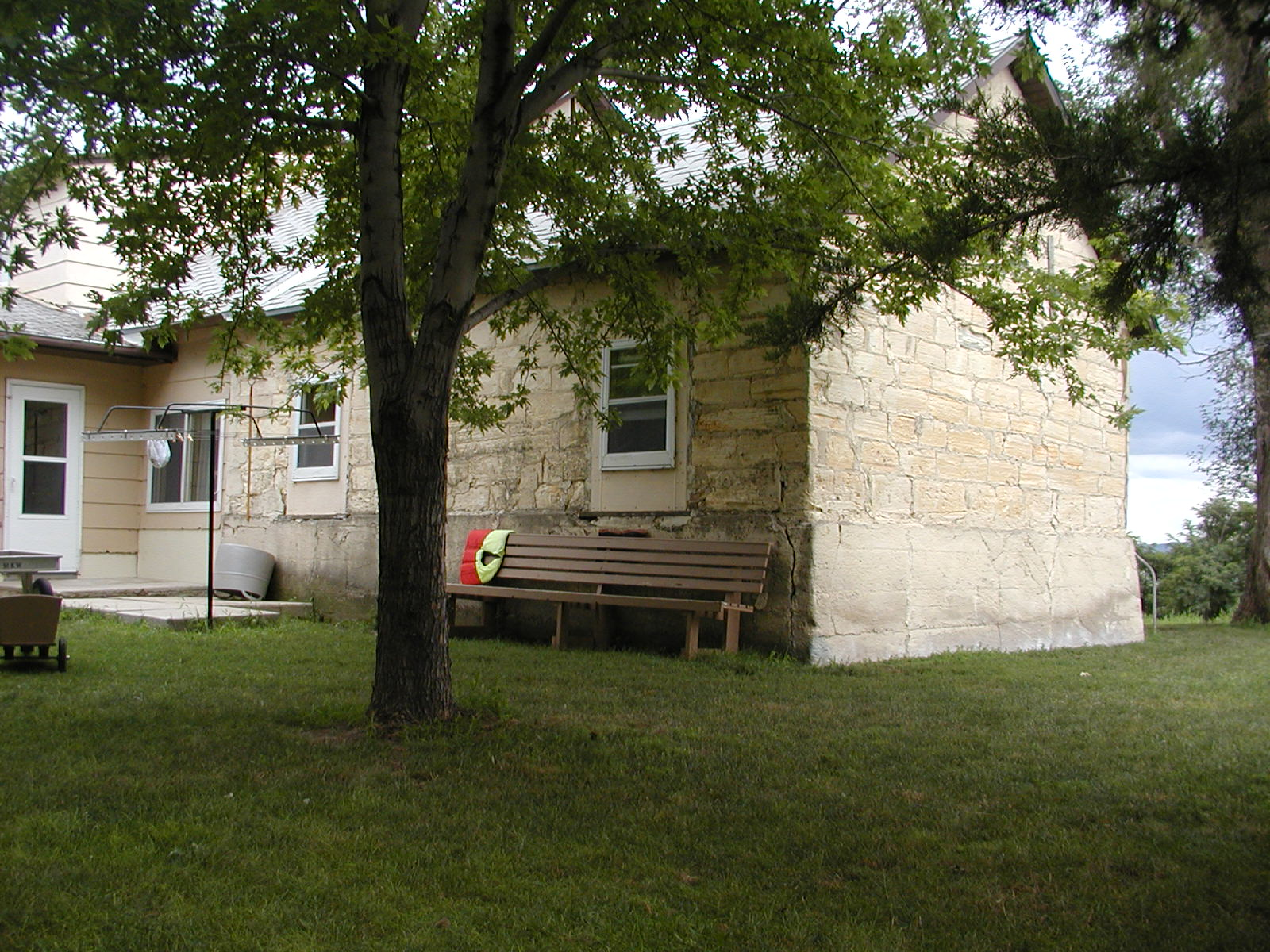
Limestone House at Bon Homme Colony

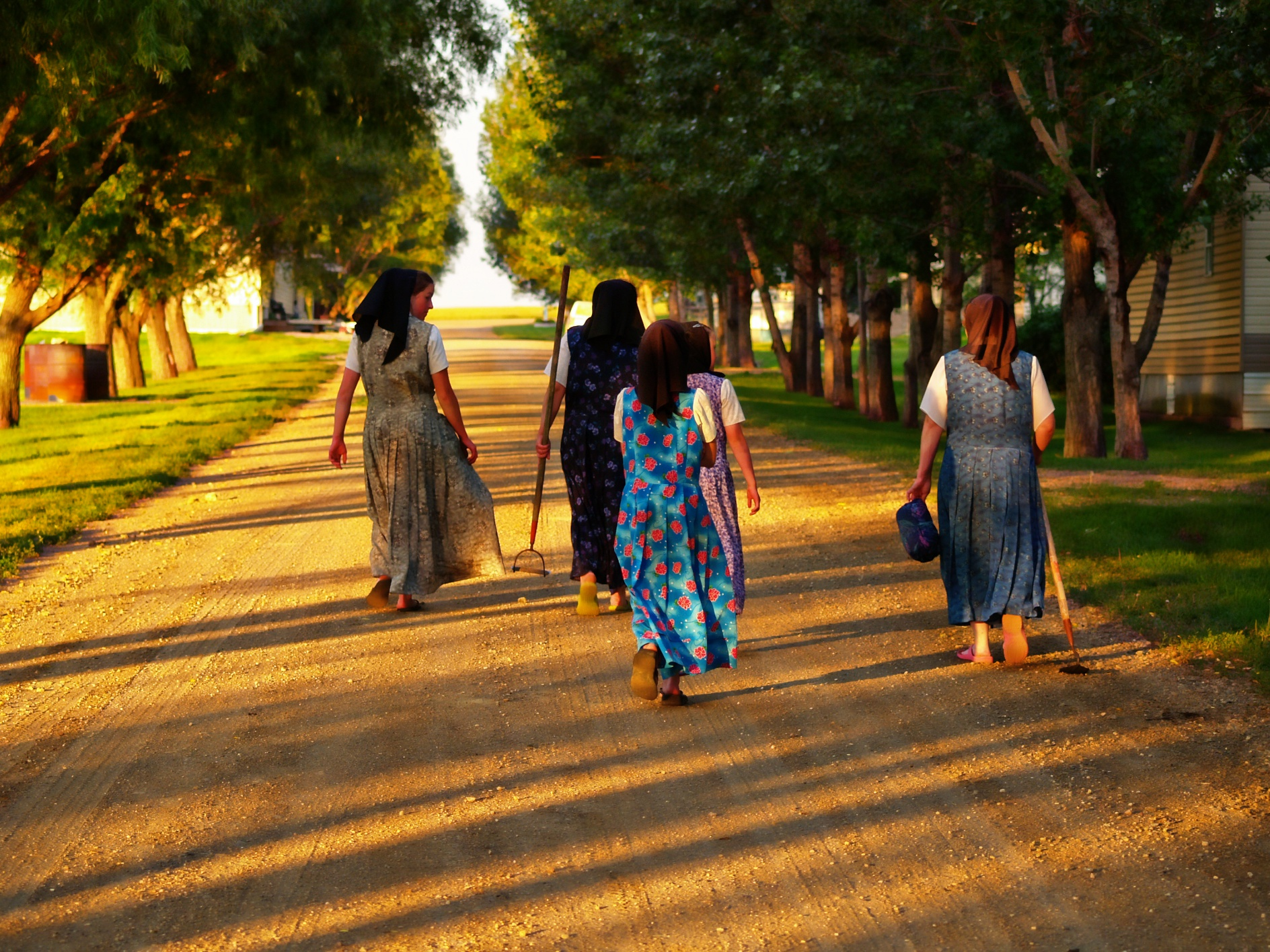
Schmiedeleut Hutterite women return from working in the fields

The Schmiedeleut, also Schmiedeleit, are a branch of the Hutterites that emerged in 1859. It is divided into two subgroups.

== Name ==
The founder of the Schmiedeleut, Michael Waldner (1834–1889), was a blacksmith and therefore called "Schmied Michel", i.e. "smith Michael". From Waldner's nickname the Schmiedeleut, meaning "smith people", took their name.

== History ==
=== Russian Empire ===
In 1857 some Hutterites under the leadership of George Waldner tried to reestablish community of goods in Hutterdorf, Ukraine, then part of the Russian Empire, after having abandoned this custom in 1819 in Radichev, but this first attempt failed. In 1859 Michael Waldner and Jakob Hofer (1830–1900) successfully reestablished a community of goods.

=== America ===
The followers of Michael Waldner, all together 113 people, left their homes in Ukraine in June 1874 to settle at Bon Homme Hutterite Colony in South Dakota, the mother colony of the Schmiedeleut. During their journey 36 children died of an epidemic of dysentery in Lincoln, Nebraska. The Schmiedeleut flourished in their new home in South Dakota and in 1878 a second colony (Tripp Colony in Yankton, South Dakota) was formed. An attempt to relocate this second colony to Tidioute, Pennsylvania, soon failed and the colony returned to South Dakota.

Shortly after World War I, two Hutterite conscientious objectors, Joseph and Michael Hofer, died in an American prison. This and the growing anti-German sentiment caused the emigration of the Schmiedeleut to Manitoba, Canada, in the following years. Five Schmiedeleut colonies (Milltown, Maxwell, Rosedale, Huron and James Valley) left the United States, only Bon Homme Colony remained.

In the 1930s the Schmiedeleut started again to form new colonies in South and North Dakota, thus returning to the United States. In 1950 there were 20 Schmiedeleut colonies in Manitoba, 15 in South Dakota and one in North Dakota. In 1973 there were 91 Schmiedeleut colonies in Manitoba, South and North Dakota. In 1980 the Schmiedeluet started their first colony in Minnesota. More were to follow to this state in the next decades.

=== Division ===
In 1992 the Schmiedleut started to divide into two subgroups over several questions like certain management procedures of the Kleinsasser group, financial ventures and a lawsuit over patent rights with another Hutterite. The relation with the Bruderhof Communities and higher education were further issues. Elder Jacob Kleinsasser of Crystal Spring Colony in Manitoba condoned all these things, while a conservative group opposed them. It took some time before separation was achieved.

The followers of Kleinsasser later took the name "Hutterian Brethren". They are also called "Schmiedeleut I" or "Group 1". They are nicknamed "Oilers". The more traditional Schmiedeleut branch took the name "Committee Hutterites". They are also called "Schmiedeleut II" or "Group 2". They are nicknamed "Gibbs".

Around the year 2010 there were 120 colonies of the more conservative "Committee Hutterites", whereas there were some 60 colonies of the "Hutterian Brethren" branch, that embraces many customs of the modern world.

There were also independent Hutterite colonies of Schmiedeleut origin, for example the Elmendorf Christian Community.

== Schmiedeleut today ==
Schmiedeleut today are the more progressive branch of the Hutterites, especially the "Hutterian Brethren" who were the followers of Elder Jacob Kleinsasser. The women of the Schmiedeleut wear a tiechle (head scarf) without or with very small polka dots, whereas Dariusleut have smaller polka dots and Lehrerleut large polka dots that cover a large amount of the pattern of the fabric.

== Literature ==
- John A. Hostetler: Hutterite Society, Baltimore, MD, 1974.
- Alvin J. Esau: The Courts and the Colonies: The Litigation of Hutterite Church Disputes, Vancouver & Toronto 2004.
- Rod Janzen and Max Stanton: The Hutterites in North America, Baltimore, MD, 2010.
- John Lehr and Yosef Kats: Inside the Ark: The Hutterites in Canada and the United States, Regina 2012.
