= The Nine (authors) =

The Nine are a group of nine Christians who authored two books about their experiences as Hutterites and how and why they chose to leave the Hutterite religion. The authors were between the ages of 17 and 25 when they left the communal Hutterite society. Glenda, Jason, and Titus left a colony in North Dakota. Cindy, Rodney, Junia, Karen, Darlene, and Sheryl left a colony in Manitoba, Canada. Five years after leaving their respective Hutterite colonies, they wrote the first book, Hutterites: Our Story To Freedom. They self-published their book through Risen Son Publishing in 2013. In 2014 they published their second book, Since We Told the Truth: Our Life Can Never Be the Same.

== Books ==
Hutterites: Our Story to Freedom is written in testimony form and style, featuring a chapter by each of The Nine. They write their own personal accounts and their view of the religion and culture of the Hutterites. While every chapter is unique to the individual author, there is a consistent pattern of their dissatisfaction with the Hutterite religion. The Nine explain current Hutterite customs and beliefs and declare that Hutterite beliefs directly contradict Christian, biblical teachings. They offer personal testimonies as evidence to expose the Hutterite system as controlling and oppressive to its members. The Nine bring to light corrupt practices of heavy-handed control by leadership, nepotism, sexism, deceptive religious teaching, and a lack of personal and formal education.

== Reception ==
The book Hutterites generated widespread controversy. While many readers welcomed and praised the rare opportunity to hear what life is like inside a Hutterite colony, the books also produced angry protests, mostly from Hutterites. Many Hutterites saw the books as sensationalizing Hutterite life for profit and claimed the book was lopsided in its perspective.

In an interview in 2014, one of the nine was quoted: "We love the Hutterite people, we see how things are being done wrong on the colony, how it is oppressive. We didn't write this out of bitterness or anger or unforgiveness." They have responded to the criticism by stating their stories are accurate and irrefutable. The Nine point out that many other former Hutterites agree with their conclusions. They also explain their motivation for writing the two books as an avenue to help others.

The second book Since We Told the Truth explains many of the controversies surrounding the first book to silence the criticism. They wrote that their reasons for exposing the abuses were to influence change in the colonies and is motivated by a love for truth and justice. However, some of the accusations against The Nine continue to occasionally arise.

== Influence ==
The two books offer an uncommon and candid glimpse into Hutterite life from a firsthand perspective. Until the release of Hutterites, firsthand accounts of the Hutterite lifestyle had been largely limited to those written by current Hutterite members, or by ones who had left the colony at an early age. According to The Nine, this had previously resulted in an idyllic and deceptive picture of Hutterite life being presented to society. With the release of the two books the entire perception of Hutterite life is being challenged. The Nine continue to spread their message through book events, presentations, interviews on television, radio, and print, speaking at various churches, and producing Christian teaching videos available online.
