= Johannes Waldner =

Hutterite leader

Johannes Waldner (1749 near Villach, Carinthia – 24 December 1824 in Radichev, Russian Empire) was a Hutterite leader and author of the Hutterite chronicle Das Klein-Geschichtsbuch der Hutterischen Brüder..

Waldner was born into a Crypto-Protestant family near Villach in Carinthia. In 1755 the Waldners and other Carinthian Protestants, so-called Landler, were forced by the Austrian government to emigrate to Transylvania, because they were not Catholic. There, part of the group joined the Hutterian Brethren, an Anabaptist group, which led to a revival of this community. Johannes' parents also joined the Brethren in 1763. Johannes Waldner himself was baptized into the Brotherhood on 17 April 1767 in Deutsch-Kreuz, today Romanian Criț. In the same year he fled with most of the Hutterites to Wallachia, because of renewed persecution by the Habsburg authorities.

The hopes for a new beginning of Hutterite church life in Wallachia were not fulfilled. After a typhus epidemic and several riots as a result of the Russian-Turkish War, the remaining Hutterites moved to Wischenka and later to Radichev in the Ukraine, where Waldner was elected preacher in 1782, Waldner ended up becoming preacher and bishop of the entire brotherhood in 1794. Waldner saw his task mainly in a revival of the Hutterite community ideal.

Therefore, in the internal conflict that broke out in 1818 about the future of the religious community, he intensively campaigned for a continuation of the community of goods. Waldner also collected earlier Hutterite sermons and issued his own sermon books. In 1793 he began to write a Hutterite chronicle, that became known as Das Klein-Geschichtsbuch der Hutterischen Brüder, which was a continuation of the (Groß)-Geschicht-Buch der Hutterischen Brüder. Both history books today form an invaluable legacy in the history of the Hutterite religious community.

Johannes Waldner was married twice. With his first wife, Maria Naegeler, whom he married in 1773, he had nine children. After Maria's death he married the widow Elisabeth Hofer. Johannes Waldner died in December 1824 at the age of 75.
