= Michael Gaismair =

German insurgent (1490–1532)

Gaismair Michael
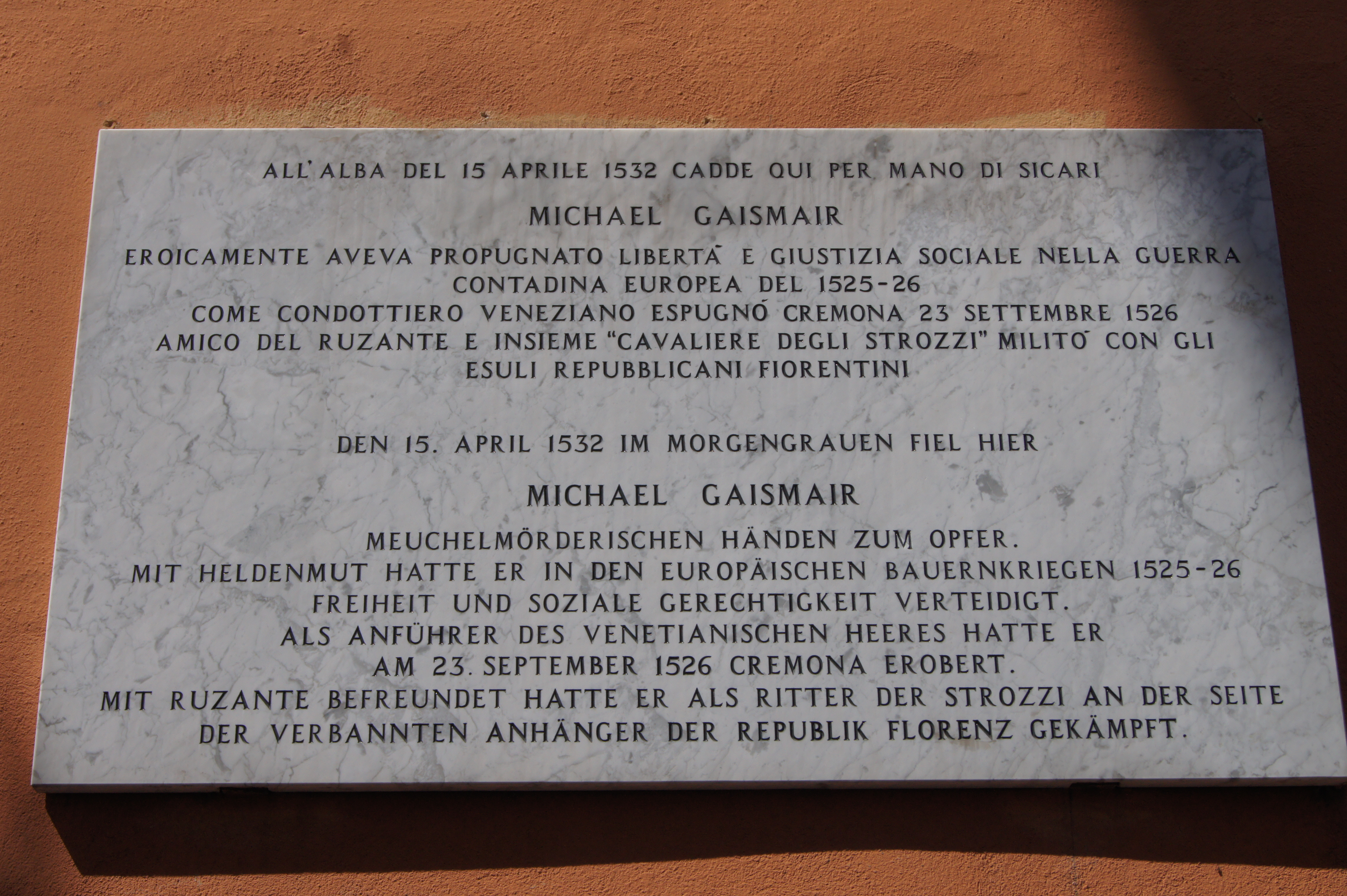
- Grave of Michael Gaismair at Padua.
- Born: 1490; Sterzing, County of Tyrol
- Died: 15 April, 1532 (aged 41–42); Padua, Republic of Venice

Michael Gaismair (1490, Sterzing, County of Tyrol – 15 April 1532, Padua, Republic of Venice) was a leader of the German Peasants' War (1524–1525) in Tyrol and the Salzburg region.

== Life ==
Michael Gaismair was the son of a mining entrepreneur, who became secretary of the powerful bishop of Brixen. In 1525 he came in contact with the ideas of the Anabaptists Felix Manz and Jörg Blaurock, who worked in the Eisacktal and Graubünden and soon afterwards, in May, he received news of the German Peasants' War in Germany, and the activities in Saxony of the radical preacher Thomas Müntzer, who shared some ideas with the Anabaptists.

Shortly thereafter, Tyrol—which was under Habsburg rule—became a powder keg of popular uprisings, especially in the Eisacktal and Puster Valley. These peasant revolts were captained by a certain Peter Passler and Gaismair: Brixen and Neustift were occupied and looted. The rebels, reinforced by local miners and survivors of the Battle of Frankenhausen, resisted the Habsburg army counterattacks.

Gaismair dreamed of founding a democratic republic in the area, he envisaged the abolition of the Catholic Church and its rituals, replaced by a faith based on direct contact with God, through the personal interpretation of Scripture. He also envisioned a utopian elimination of titles of nobility, the nationalization of land and mines, the establishment of schools, hospitals, old people’s homes etc.

To overcome the differences, the leaders of the revolt were invited to the regional diet of Innsbruck (June 1525) by Crown Prince Ferdinand of Habsburg (b. 1503, Emperor 1558–1564). Gaismair also went there, but in August he was jailed for treason. After two months, he managed to escape, travelling to Graubünden, Switzerland.

Gaismair established contact with the Swiss reformer Ulrich Zwingli, with the plan of a new democratic order in Tyrol and Salzburg by the example of Grisons and Venice. Among other things, by the disappointing experience of the parliamentary debates Gaismair evolved from reformer (Summer 1525) to revolutionary social rebel (1526). In his draft of a new order of Tyrol in May 1526, Gaismair designed an egalitarian, democratic, Christian state.

Gaismair again gained followers, and in the spring of 1526 assisted the revolt of the peasants in Salzburg. Despite the victories on the field, Gaismair and his army were forced to retreat through the territory of the Republic of Venice, then at war with the Habsburgs. The Bauernführer (head of the farmers), as Gaismair was called, then turned to the Doge Andrea Gritti (1523–1538) to convince him to support a military revolt in Tyrol, but he failed in his intent.

He died in 1532 in Padua, in Prato della Valle (where there is a plaque in his memory) murdered at the hands of two soldiers who wanted to collect the bounty placed on his head by Ferdinand I. The movement of Gaismair was then done, but not the religious turmoil of Tyrol, which in the same years saw the development of Anabaptist preaching by Jakob Hutter.

== Historiography ==
Because of his struggle against Church and Monarchy, Gaismair was ignored by historians of his time. In the twentieth century, his figure got more purchasing reputation, coming in first by the Communist (Community dell'afflato by inspiring his statutes, and that was pointed out by none other than Friedrich Engels), and by the Nazis (which emphasized his fight against the Earl of Salamanca, a Jewish adviser to Ferdinand).

It is only since the second half of the twentieth century that scholars have tried to evaluate the story of Michael Gaismair from a nonideological perspective, especially promoted by the Michael Gaismair Gesellschaft (Society Michael Gaismair), founded in 1976.

== Plays inspired by the figure of Michael Gaismair ==
In 1899 Franz Kranewitter, a Tyrolean author of patriotic dramas, wrote a play dedicated to the figure of the rebel, named Michel Gaissmayr. In the summer of 2001, at the Tiroler Volksschauspiele theatre festival, a drama was staged dedicated to the rise and fall of Gaismair by the Austrian author Felix Mitterer.

== See also ==
- Christian communism
- Radical Reformation
- Protestant reformers

== Notes ==
- Oskar Vasella (1964). "Gaismair, Michael". Neue Deutsche Biographie (in German). Vol. 6. Berlin: Duncker & Humblot. p. 40.
- Heinrich von Zeißberg (1878). "Gaismair, Michael" . Allgemeine Deutsche Biographie (in German). Vol. 8. Leipzig: Duncker & Humblot. pp. 313–314.
- Jürgen Bücking, Michael Gaismair, reformers, social rebel, revolutionary. His role in the Tyrolean "Peasants' War" (1525/32). Stuttgart 1978.
- Josef Macek, The Tyrolean peasant war and Michael Gaismair. Berlin 1965.
- Hans Benedikter, Rebell im Land Tirol. Wien 1970.
- Fridolin Dörrer (Hg.), Die Bauernkriege und Michael Gaismair. Protokoll des internationalen Symposions vom 15. – 19. November 1976 in Innsbruck-Vill, Innsbruck 1982.
- Walter Klaassen, Michael Gaismair: Revolutionary and Reformer. Leiden 1978.
- Karl Springenschmid, Die Gaismair Saga - Lebensbild eines Revolutionärs. Graz 1980
- Angelika Bischoff-Urack, Michael Gaismair. Ein Beitrag zur Sozialgeschichte des Bauernkrieges. Innsbruck 1983.
- Werner Legère, The dreaded Gaismair. Berlin 1981
- Ralf Höller, Eine Leiche in Habsburgs Keller - Der Rebell Michael Gaismair und sein Kampf für eine gerechtere Welt. Otto-Müller-Verlag, Salzburg-Wien 2011.
