= Hutterite German =

Upper German dialect spoken by Hutterites in North America

- Hutterisch
- Region: Alberta, Saskatchewan, and Manitoba, Canada; Washington, Montana, Minnesota, North and South Dakota, United States
- Native speakers: 40,000 (2007)
- Language family: Indo-European: Germanic; West Germanic; Elbe Germanic; (High German); Upper German; Bavarian; Southern; Hutterite German

Language codes
- ISO 639-3: geh
- Glottolog: hutt1235

Hutterite German (German: Hutterisch) is an Upper German dialect of the Bavarian variety of the German language, which is spoken by Hutterite communities in Canada and the United States. Hutterite is also called Tirolean, but this is an anachronism.

== Distribution and literacy ==
Hutterite is spoken in the US states of Washington, Montana, North and South Dakota, Minnesota and Oregon; and in the Canadian provinces of Alberta, Saskatchewan, and Manitoba. Its speakers belong to the Schmiedleit, Lehrerleit, and Dariusleit Hutterite groups, but there is also a small number of speakers among the older generations of Prairieleit (the descendants of those Hutterites who chose not to settle in colonies). The Schmiedleit, Lehrerleit, and Dariusleit each have their own distinct dialects. Hutterite children who grow up in the colonies learn and speak Hutterite German before learning English, the standard language of the surrounding areas.

As of 2003, there are about 34,000 speakers in the world, 85% of them living in 333 communities in Canada and the remaining 15% in 123 communities in the US. Canadian adults are generally literate in Early New High German (also called "Biblical German", and the predecessor to Standard German used by Martin Luther) that they employ as the written form for Scriptures while Standard German is used in the US for religious activities. Children learn English at school; Canadian Hutterites have a functional knowledge of English. Hutterite is for the most part an unwritten language, though in August 2006 Hutterite author Linda Maendel released a children's story titled Lindas glücklicher Tag (Linda's Happy Day) in which all the dialogue is written in the dialect. Maendel is also working on a series of biblical stories with Wycliffe Bible Translators.

== History and related languages ==
Hutterite German is a koiné language originally based on the Bavarian dialects spoken in Tyrol, home of Jacob Hutter and many early Hutterites, but it shifted its base to Carinthia dialects in the mid-18th century when so-called "Landler", Crypto-Protestants from Carinthia, were forced by empress Maria Theresia to resettle to Transylvania. A larger group of them joined the scattered remnants of the Hutterites who had been able to settle in Transylvania where there was more religious tolerance than in other parts of the Habsburg monarchy. This tolerance for different Christian groups emerged when Transylvania was ruled by the Ottoman Empire whose rulers did not care about theological differences among the "infidels" they ruled.

Hutterite German is only about 50% intelligible to a speaker of Pennsylvania Dutch, as the latter variant is based on dialects spoken around the Electoral Palatinate. Hutterite German therefore belongs to the Southern Bavarian dialect group which is spoken in the southern parts of Bavaria and Austria except for the westernmost part (Vorarlberg).

The language has adopted a limited number of Russian and also many English loan words, which are the result of Hutterite migrations into Ukraine in the Russian Empire from 1770, and then the United States from 1874 and Canada after World War I. The core vocabulary is still almost exclusively of German origin.

== See also ==
- Pennsylvania Dutch
- Plautdietsch language
- Texas German

== Literature ==
- Helga Lorenz-Andreasch: "Mir sein jå kolla Teitschverderber" - die Sprache der Schmiedeleut-Hutterer in Manitoba/Kanada, Wien 2004. (Contains a short description of Hutterisch)
- Hoover, Walter B. (1997). Di Hutrisha Shproch, An Introduction to the Language of the Hutterites of North America with a Special Emphasis upon the Language and History of the Hutterian Prairie People at Langham, Saskatchewan, Canada : A Grammar and Lexicon. Saskatoon.
- Herfried Scheer: Die deutsche Mundart der Hutterischen Brüder in Nordamerika, Wien 1987. (A Hutterisch - Standard German - English dictionary of about 1.0000 words on 321 pages)
