= Dariusleut =

Hutterite branch

The Dariusleut, also Dariusleit, are a branch of the Hutterites that emerged in 1860.

== History ==
=== Russian Empire ===
In 1859, Michael Waldner and Jakob Hofer (1830–1900) successfully reestablished a community of goods among some Hutterites in Hutterdorf, Ukraine, then part of the Russian Empire. This group was named Schmiedeleut. In 1860, another group of Hutterites did the same under the leadership of Darius Walter (1835–1903) also in Hutterdorf, Ukraine, but on the opposite side of the village. This group was called Dariusleut, after the first name of its leader.

=== America ===
The Dariusleut left their homes in Ukraine in June 1874 together with the Schmiedeleut. During the first winter, the Dariusleut lived on government grounds at Silver Lake, South Dakota. In 1875, they founded their first colony on American soil, Wolf Creek Hutterite Colony in South Dakota, the mother colony of the Dariusleut.

Shortly after World War I, two Hutterite conscientious objectors, Joseph and Michael Hofer, died in an American prison. This and growing anti-German sentiment caused the emigration of all six Dariusleut colonies to Alberta, Canada, in the following years.

In the 1930s, the Schmiedeleut started to form new colonies in Montana, thus returning to the United States. In 1950, there were 25 Schmiedeleut colonies in Alberta and four in Montana.

== Japan ==
Owa Hutterite Colony, a Hutterite colony of ethnic Japanese that is affiliated with the Dariusleut, was founded in 1972.
