= Minor Party (Unity of the Brethren) =

Christian group in Bohemia

The Minor Party, or Amosites, was a Christian group in Bohemia that split from the Unity of the Brethren during the late 1490s. Its members saw themselves as adhering to the original beliefs of the Unity.

The Minor Party was persecuted and ceased to exist in the mid-16th century.

== Unity of the Brethren ==
Today's Unity of the Brethren has very different beliefs, far from when it was founded. Its original doctrines can be found in the early accounts of the book compilation Net of Faith, a translation of part of the writings of Petr Chelcicky. The book records some of the important doctrinal positions of the Unity of the Brethren during its formative years.

In 1490, the Edict of Brandýs allowed community members to hold public office and opened the door to further reforms of the social policy of the Unity of the Brethren. Furthermore, many of them made alliances with the Hussites and, in the long run, resulted in the formation of what is now known as the Moravians. It changed a lot of their doctrines to lessen the persecution that it experienced from the Catholic and the Protestant churches.

== Minor and Major Parties ==
However, a minority within the Unity of Brethren believed that these reforms were invalid. They stood up for the original doctrines and later they became known as the Minor Party, separating themselves from the Major Party, which had accepted the reforms. The Minor Party believed that they were the only ones who followed the Net of Faith. John Kalenec became a bishop in the Minor Party after the death of Brother Amos. Kalenec had been born among the Utraquist, but about 1520 joined with the Minor Party.

== Beliefs ==
- They believed that the term "minister" must not be limited to those who finished a course on theology or ministry or to those ordained by the clergy but that all Christians must be considered ministers.
- They avoided holding any public offices and did not participate in politics and the military.
- They preached God's word from house to house, but that was less severely observed during their times because of persecution.
- They believed that images should not be used in worship.
- They did not believe in Purgatory.
- They considered Bible as the only basis of faith.
- The Major Party used the Tetragrammaton, the Hebrew name of God, usually translated as Jehovah or Yahweh in English, in its publications.

The Minor Party, oppressed by the persecution from other churches and the Major Party, eventually came to dissolution after their last leaders were executed by their persecutors. Some of them were absorbed into the rising Anabaptist movement.
