= John A. Hostetler =

American scholar (1918–2001)

John A. Hostetler (October 29, 1918 – August 8, 2001) was an American author, educator, and scholar of Amish and Hutterite societies. Some of his works are still in print.

== Life ==
John Andrew Hostetler was born to an Old Order Amish family in the Kishacoquillas Valley (known locally as the Big Valley) region of Mifflin County, Pennsylvania, the fifth of seven children of Joseph and Nancy Hostetler. At the age of eleven, his parents moved to Iowa. As a youth he supervised his father's turkey operation, took courses on poultry raising, and received a poultry-judging license from the American Poultry Association. He discovered that he enjoyed reading more than raising turkeys and feeding hogs. He was sixteen when his essay "Some Effects of Alcohol and Tobacco" was published by the Mennonite youth paper The Words of Cheer. Never baptized in the Amish church, Hostetler joined the Mennonite Church in 1935. He attended Hesston College in 1941, but with US involvement in World War II, he was called to the draft. Utilizing a religious exemption from active duty, Hostetler, as a conscientious objector, was assigned to Civilian Public Service in several locations. After the war, he graduated from Goshen College with a degree in sociology (1949). While at Goshen he assisted dean Harold S. Bender by writing articles on the Amish and similar groups for the four-volume Mennonite Encyclopedia which Bender was editing, beginning a productive and prolific academic career.

Hostetler married Hazel Schrock in June 1949. They moved to State College, Pennsylvania, where he began graduate studies in rural sociology at the Pennsylvania State University. In 1951, his wife and a daughter died in childbirth, the same year that Hostetler's Annotated Bibliography on the Amish won the University of Chicago's annual Folklore Prize. In 1953 Hostetler married Beulah Stauffer, a book editor at Herald Press. They had three daughters, and their marriage marked the beginning of a 48-year collaboration on many projects. He died in 2001 at the age of 82.

== Educator and author ==
Dismayed by inaccurate popular essays on the Amish, Hostetler published Amish Life (Herald Press, 1952) and The Amish (Herald Press, 1995), books still in print at his death, whose combined sales approached 850,000 copies at that time. He received his Ph.D. degree from Pennsylvania State University in 1953 for his dissertation The Sociology of Mennonite Evangelism, which was later published by Herald Press. During a five-year stint at the Mennonite Publishing House, he served as book editor and also wrote a history of the press, God Uses Ink (1958).

Beginning in 1959 he held faculty teaching appointments at the University of Alberta, Penn State Abington (Penn State Ogontz campus), and Temple University where he retired in 1985. He lectured widely at colleges and universities and held several visiting professorships including five years (1986–1990) as a Distinguished Scholar-in-Residence at the Young Center for Anabaptist and Pietist Studies at Elizabethtown College, where his wife also held a teaching appointment.

== Work ==
Hostetler's scholarship and publications included at least twenty articles in church periodicals, nearly that number in The Mennonite Quarterly Review and the Mennonite Historical Bulletin as well as some twenty additional articles in other scholarly journals including the Journal of the Royal Anthropological Institute and the American Journal of Medical Genetics. He contributed at least fifteen chapters to edited books as well as several essays to encyclopedias. Hostetler produced eight full-length books and six booklets for popular audiences including the best selling Amish Life. His most important and influential book was Amish Society (Johns Hopkins); first published in 1963, with a fourth edition in 1993, it became one of the best-selling volumes in the history of the Johns Hopkins University Press. Hutterite Society (Johns Hopkins, 1974) provided an authoritative account of Hutterite life and society. Other major books included Children in Amish Society (Holt, Rinehart & Winston, 1971) co-authored with his long-time colleague Gertrude Enders Huntington, and Amish Roots (Johns Hopkins, 1989). At the Amish Tricentennial Conference at Elizabethtown College in 1993, Hostetler was recognized and presented with a festschrift, The Amish and the State (Johns Hopkins, 1993) which honored his scholarly contributions.

During the early 1960s Hostetler organized an extensive study of Hutterite religious, educational and social practices, with particular focus on socialization patterns, in three colonies, two in southern Canada and one in the northern U.S. state of Montana. The study was funded by the U.S. Office of Education and enlisted numerous consultants and fieldworkers, the latter headed by anthropologist Gertrude Huntington, who lived with some of her family as participating members of an Alberta colony during one summer. Hostetler and Huntington published their findings in The Hutterites in North America in 1967—it has been reprinted in several new editions since then.

In addition to his formal publications Hostetler wrote many research reports, directed six funded research projects, and served as an expert witness in at least five court cases involving minority groups, the most prominent being Wisconsin v. Yoder, which was heard by the U.S. Supreme Court in 1972. He was an active participant in the National Committee for Amish Religious Freedom. Hostetler served as an advisor to two major films: The Amish: A People of Preservation (1976) and The Hutterites: To Care and Not to Care (1983). Among numerous awards, John A. Hostetler was a Fulbright Scholar, received an honorary doctorate from Elizabethtown College, and was recognized by the Society for German-American Studies and the National Historic Communal Societies Association.

== Major works ==
=== As author ===
- Amish Life, Scottdale, Pa, 1952.
- Mennonite Life, Scottdale, Pa, 1954.
- Amish Society, Baltimore, 1963.
- Hutterite Life, Scottdale, Pa, 1965.
- Communitarian Societies New York, 1973.
- Hutterite Society, Baltimore, 1974.
- The Amish, Baltimore, 1982 .
- Amish Roots: a treasury of history, wisdom, and lore, Baltimore, 1989.

=== As co-author with Gertrude Enders Huntington ===
- The Hutterites in North America, New York, 1967.
- Children in Amish Society : Socialization and Community Education, New York, 1971.
- Amish Children : Education in the Family, School, and Community, Fort Worth, 1992, 2nd edition.
