= Jakob Hutter =

Tyrolean Anabaptist leader and founder of the Hutterites

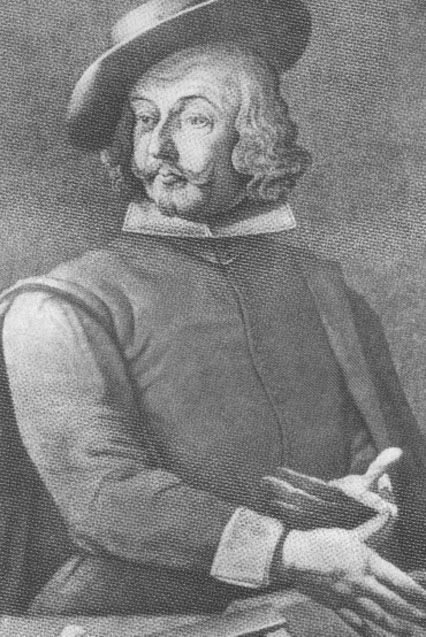
Jakob Hutter, 18th century engraving

Jakob Hutter (/ˈhʌtər/; Austrian German: [ˈhʊtɐ]; also spelled Huter or Hueter; c. 1500 – 25 February 1536) was a Tyrolean Anabaptist leader and founder of the Hutterites.

== Biography ==
Hutter was born in the small hamlet of Moos near St. Lorenzen in the Puster Valley, in the County of Tyrol (present-day South Tyrol, Italy). He learned hat making in nearby Prags and became an itinerant craftsman. Later he settled in Spittal, Carinthia.

He probably first encountered Anabaptists in Klagenfurt and soon thereafter was converted to their belief. He began preaching in the Puster Valley region, forming several small congregations. As soon as the Habsburg authorities in Tyrol learned of these activities in early 1529, they (Catholic Church) began to persecute the Anabaptists. In 1527, the Habsburg archduke Ferdinand I of Austria declared that seductive doctrines and heretical sects "will not be tolerated". In turn, Hutter and a few others went to investigate Moravia, because they heard the persecution was not as severe there. They visited Auspitz, where they found the situation was indeed more tolerant and the Tyrolean Anabaptists decided to emigrate. As small groups moved to Moravia, Hutter first remained in Tyrol to pastor to those who remained. He escaped capture by the authorities because other captured Anabaptists would not reveal his whereabouts, even under severe torture.

Hutter arrived in Moravia in 1533, when the persecution of the Anabaptists in Tyrol was at its peak. Many Anabaptists from the Palatinate, Swabia and Silesia also went to Moravia. Hutter united the local Anabaptist congregations, enabling Anabaptism in Moravia to flourish. Under Hutter's leadership, several of the congregations adopted the early Christian practice of communal ownership of goods, in addition to their Anabaptist beliefs of nonviolence, and adult baptism.

In 1535, however, the Moravian Landtag diet had all Anabaptists expelled from Moravia and they scattered to surrounding countries. Hutter returned to Tyrol, where he and his wife were arrested on 30 November 1535 in Klausen and brought to the fortress of Branzoll (Bronzolo). On 9 December, Hutter was deported to the Tyrolean capital Innsbruck, where he was interrogated and pressured to recant. Even under severe torture he would not recant or reveal the names of other Anabaptists. Hutter was sentenced to death by fire and burned at the stake on 25 February 1536 in Innsbruck in front of the Golden Roof. According to the Hutterian Chronicle, a total of 360 Anabaptists were executed in Tyrol.

Hutter's words are recorded in eight letters, written under severe persecution.

== Commemoration ==
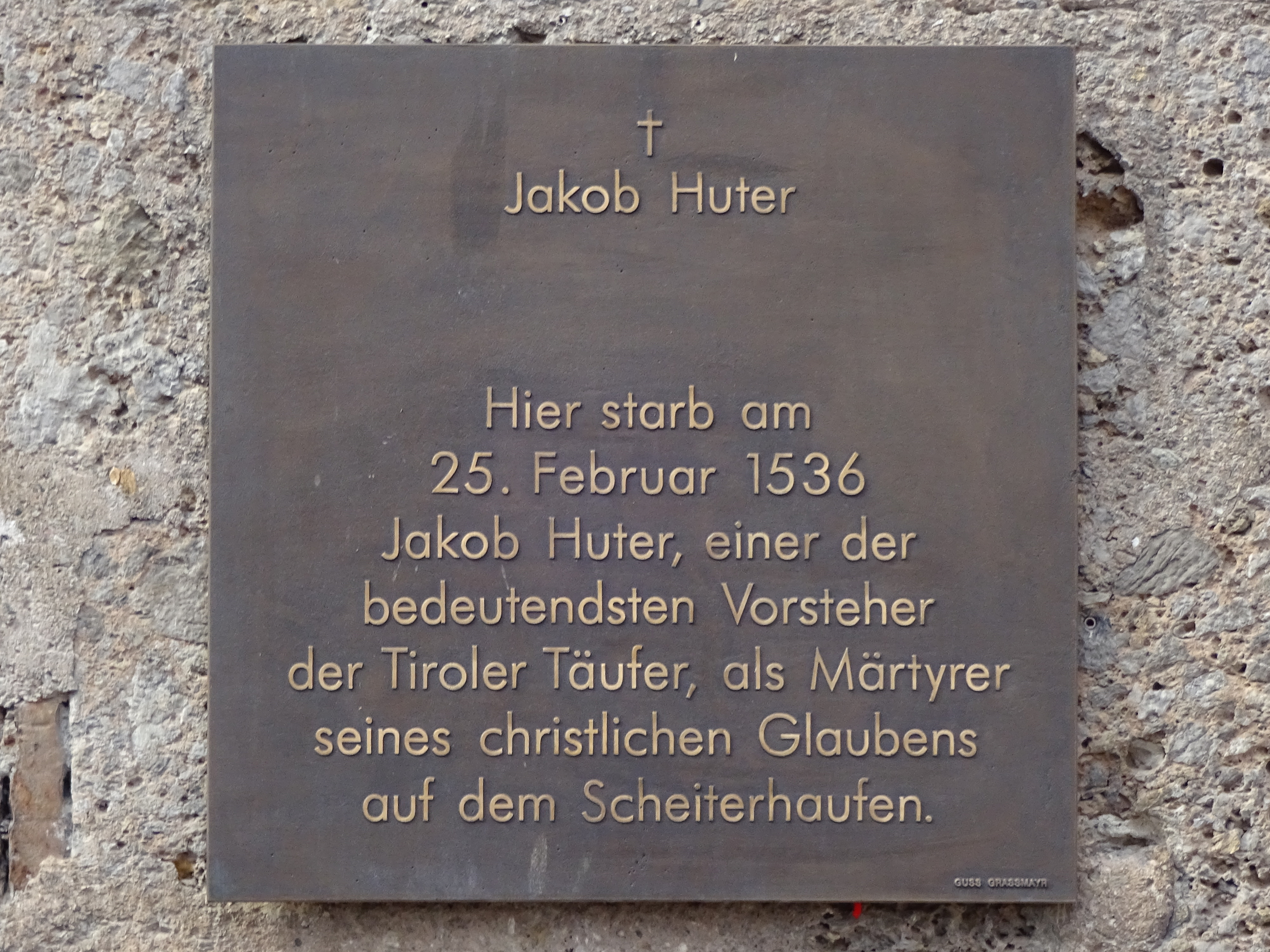
Plaque at the Golden Roof: "Jakob Huter, one of the most important leaders of the Tyrolean Anabaptists, died here on 25 February 1536 as a martyr of his Christian faith at the stake."

In Innsbruck, Hutter is remembered by a plaque at the Golden Roof.

In 2006–2007, a working group with representatives from Protestant and Catholic churches, the peace movement Pax Christi and the Association of Evangelical churches in Tyrol worked toward reconciliation with the Hutterites. On 25 February 2007, the group, along with three couples invited to represent the Hutterites, held a memorial ceremony at the Golden Roof and a joint prayer service in the old city hall in Innsbruck.
