= Joseph and Michael Hofer =

Conscientious objectors

Joseph and Michael Hofer were brothers who died from mistreatment at the United States Disciplinary Barracks, Fort Leavenworth in 1918. The pair, who were Hutterites from South Dakota, were among four conscientious objectors from their Christian colony who had been court-martialed and sentenced to twenty years imprisonment for refusing to be drafted in to the United States Army during World War I. After initially being sent to Fort Alcatraz for refusal to comply with military orders and discipline, Joseph and Michael were transferred to Fort Leavenworth, Kansas, where they both died within two weeks of their arrival. Their bodies were returned to their families in military uniforms that they had refused to wear.

The death of the brothers contributed to the decision by Hutterites to begin emigrating to Canada in 1918 and in subsequent years.

== Events ==
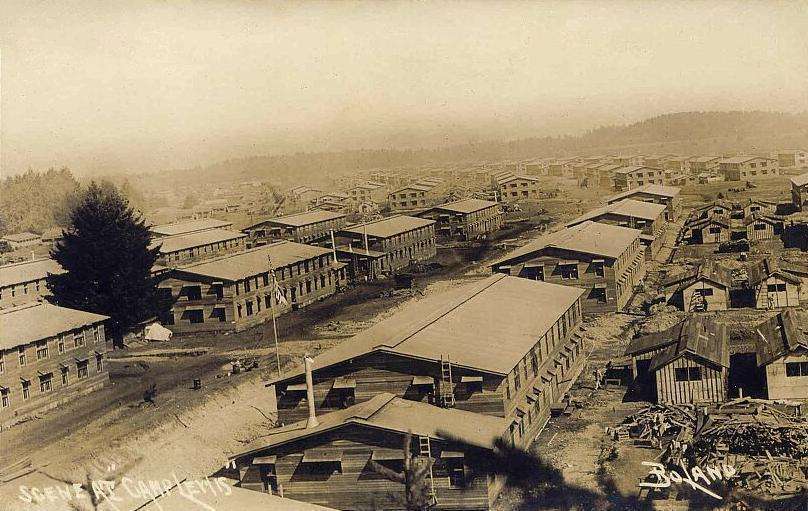
1917 at Camp Lewis, near Tacoma, Washington.

In Spring 1918, 23-year-old Joseph and 24-year-old Michael Hofer along with their older brother, David (28) and Joseph's brother-in-law, Jacob Wipf (30) were conscripted into the U.S. Army under the Selective Service Act of 1917. The group from the Rockport Colony in South Dakota was ordered to report for military training at Camp Lewis in Washington. However, on arrival they refused to wear military uniforms or comply with any commands or orders on the grounds they were conscientious objectors based on their religious beliefs.

All four men were court-martialed and sentenced to twenty years of hard labor at the US Army's military prison at Fort Alcatraz (it would become Alcatraz Federal Penitentiary in 1934). After refusing to work, they endured abusive conditions at Alcatraz for several months. First they were consigned for days in solitary cells, in what was known as "the hole," where they received only daily rations of bread and water. They were also subjected to a torture technique known as "high cuffing," in which their hands were chained to the tops of their cell doors with their feet barely able to touch the floor.

In late Fall 1918, the men were transferred from Fort Alcatraz to the United States Disciplinary Barracks at Fort Leavenworth in Kansas, arriving on November 19, eight days after the end of World War I. Within two weeks of arriving, Joseph died on November 29, followed by Michael on December 2. The U.S. Army's official verdict was that both men had died of pneumonia contracted during the 1918 flu pandemic. However, Hutterites were convinced they had died from mistreatment. In what was felt by the community to be a deliberate and tactless act, the U.S. Army returned Joseph's body outfitted in a military uniform but did not do so with Michael's body after pleading from the family, which had come to visit. The brothers were buried in the Rockport Colony with the word "martyr" appended to their grave markers.

The two brothers were jailed along with another brother, David Hofer, and another Hutterite, Jacob Wipf. David was released soon after the two brothers died and Jacob about 5 months later.

== Legacy ==
In the Chronicle of the Hutterian Brethren, the official church history of the Hutterites, it states that Michael and Joseph Hofer "died in prison as a result of cruel mistreatment by the United States military." The National Civil Liberties Bureau, a forerunner of the American Civil Liberties Union, cited the Hofer brothers as exhibit A in accusing the U.S. government of mistreating conscientious objectors during World War I. Although the basic outline of this account is relatively well known, the recent discovery of several significant caches of letters—exchanges between the men and their families—has shed new light on their story and the conditions they had to endure.

== See also ==
- Anabaptism
- Christian pacifism
