= The Peasant War in Germany =

1850 work of history by Engels

The Peasant War in Germany (German: Der deutsche Bauernkrieg) by Friedrich Engels is a short account of the early-16th-century uprisings known as the German Peasants' War (1524–1525). It was written by Engels in London during the summer of 1850, following the revolutionary uprisings of 1848–1849, to which it frequently refers in a comparative fashion. "Three centuries have flown by since then," he writes, "and many a thing has changed; still the peasant war is not as far removed from our present-day struggles as it would seem, and the opponents we have to encounter remain essentially the same."

== Background ==
The book was written by Engels in London during the summer of 1850, following the revolutionary uprisings of 1848–49, to which it frequently refers in a comparative fashion. "Three centuries have flown by since then," he writes, "and many a thing has changed; still the peasant war is not as far removed from our present-day struggles as it would seem, and the opponents we have to encounter remain essentially the same."

Engels praises the historian Wilhelm Zimmermann's book The History of the Great Peasant War (1841–1843) as "the best compilation of factual data" regarding the Peasant War of 1525 and acknowledges that most of the material relating to the peasant revolts and to Thomas Müntzer has been taken from Zimmermann's book. The Peasant War in Germany originally appeared in the fifth and sixth issues of the Neue Rheinische Zeitung-Revue, a political economic review edited by Karl Marx in Hamburg, and was later reissued in book forms.

Drawing upon the aims and methods of historical materialism, Engels downplays the importance of political and religious causes for the war traditionally cited, focusing instead on material, economic factors. "This book," Engels writes in the preface to the second edition,

undertakes ... to prove that the political and religious theories were not the causes [of the conflict], but the result of that stage of development of agriculture, industry, land and waterways, commerce and finance, which then existed in Germany. This, the only materialistic conception of history, originates, not from myself but from Marx, and can be found in his works on the French Revolution of 1848–9...."

Engels details the complex class structure of Germany in the era of the peasant war, and explores the ambiguous role in it of the knights, lesser noblemen whose commitment to preserving their feudal powers overrode their alliances with the peasants. Similarly, Engels offers a scathing critique of Martin Luther as an opportunistic "middle-class" reformer and a betrayer not just of the revolution but of some of his own best-known Christian tenets:

Luther had given the plebeian movement a powerful weapon—a translation of the Bible. Through the Bible, he contrasted feudal Christianity of his time with moderate Christianity of the first century. In opposition to decaying feudal society, he held up the picture of another society which knew nothing of the ramified and artificial feudal hierarchy. The peasants had made extensive use of this weapon against the forces of the princes, the nobility, and the clergy. Now Luther turned the same weapon against the peasants, extracting from the Bible a veritable hymn to the authorities ordained by God—a feat hardly exceeded by any lackey of absolute monarchy. Princedom by the grace of God, passive resistance, even serfdom, were being sanctioned by the Bible.

Depending on the historians' own perspective, the war could be interpreted, as Friedrich Engels does, as a case in which an emerging bourgeoisie (the urban class) failed to assert a sense of its own autonomy in the face of princely power, and left the rural classes to their fate.

== Contents ==
=== Social classes in the 16th-century Holy Roman Empire ===
==== Princes ====
Sixteenth century Germany was part of the Holy Roman Empire, a decentralized entity in which the Holy Roman Emperor himself had little authority outside of his own dynastic lands, which covered only a small fraction of the whole. There were hundreds of largely independent secular and ecclesiastical territories in the empire, most of which were ruled by a noble dynasty (though several dozen were city states). Many were autocratic rulers who barely recognized any other authority within their territories. Princes had the right to levy taxes and borrow money as they saw fit. The growing costs of administration and military upkeep impelled the princes to keep raising their subjects' cost of living. The lesser nobility and the clergy paid no taxes and often supported their local prince. Many towns had privileges that exempted them from paying taxes, and so the bulk of the burden of taxation fell on the peasants. Princes often attempted to force their freer peasants into serfdom through increasing taxes and the introduction of Roman Civil law. Roman Civil law was advantageous to those princes who sought to consolidate their power, because it brought all land into their personal ownership and eliminated the feudal concept of the land as a trust between lord and peasant that conferred rights as well as obligations on the latter. By maintaining the remnants of the ancient law which legitimized their own rule, they not only elevated their wealth and position in the empire through the confiscation of all property and revenues, but also their dominion over their peasant subjects. Under this ancient law, the peasants had little recourse beyond passive resistance. Even so, the prince now had absolute control over all his serfs and their possessions. Uprisings generally remained isolated, unsupported and easily put down until Thomas Müntzer and similar radicals began to reject the legitimizing factors of ancient law and invoked the concept of "Godly Law" as a vehicle for rousing the people.

==== Lesser nobility ====
The evolving military technology of the late medieval period began to render the lesser nobility of knights obsolete. The introduction of military science and the growing importance of gunpowder and infantry lessened the importance of their role as heavy cavalry, as well as reducing the strategic importance of their castles. Their luxurious lifestyle drained what little income they had as prices kept rising. They exercised their ancient rights in order to wring what income they could from their territories. The knights became embittered as they grew progressively impoverished and fell increasingly under the jurisdiction of the princes. Thus these two classes were in constant conflict. The knights also considered the clergy to be an arrogant and superfluous estate, while envying the privileges and wealth that the church statutes secured. In addition, the knights, who were often in debt to the towns, were constantly in conflict with the town patricians.

==== Clergy ====
The clergy, or prelate class, was losing its place as the intellectual authority over all matters within the state. The progress of printing (especially of the Bible) and the expansion of commerce, as well as the spread of renaissance humanism raised literacy rates throughout the Empire. The Catholic monopoly on higher education was accordingly also reduced. Over time, Catholic institutions had slipped into corruption. Clerical ignorance and the abuses of simony and pluralism (holding several offices at once) were rampant. Some bishops, archbishops, abbots and priors were as ruthless in exploiting their subjects as the regional princes. In addition to the sale of indulgences, they set up prayer houses and directly taxed the people. Increased indignation over Church corruption had led the monk Martin Luther to post his 95 Theses on the doors of the Castle Church in Wittenberg, Germany in 1517, as well as impelling other reformers to radically rethink Church doctrine and organization.

==== Patricians ====
As the guilds grew and urban populations rose, the town patricians faced increasing opposition. The patricians consisted of wealthy families that sat alone in the town councils and held all the administrative offices. Like the princes, they could seek to secure revenues from their peasants by any possible means. Arbitrary road, bridge and gate tolls could be instituted at will. They gradually revoked the common lands and made it illegal for a farmer to fish or log wood in what was once land held in common. Guild taxes were exacted. All revenues collected were not subject to formal administration, and civic accounts were neglected. Thus embezzlement and fraud were commonly practiced and the patrician class, bound by family ties, became ever richer and more exploitative.

==== Bürgers ====
The town patricians were increasingly criticized by the growing bürger class, which consisted of well-to-do middle-class citizens who often held administrative guild positions or worked as merchants. To the bürgers, their own growing wealth was reason enough to claim the right to control civic administration. They openly demanded a town assembly made up of both patricians and burghers, or at least a restriction of simony and the allocation of several seats to bürgers. The bürgers also opposed the clergy, who they felt had overstepped their bounds and failed to uphold their religious duties. They demanded an end to the clergy's special privileges, such as their exemption from taxation, as well as a reduction in their number. The bürger–master (guild master, or artisan) now owned both the workshop and its tools, which he allowed his apprentices to use, and provided the materials that his workers needed to make their products. In exchange, they received payments whose size the bürger determined after taking into account how long their labour had taken, as well as the quality of their workmanship and the quantity of products produced. Journeymen lost the opportunity to rise in the ranks of the guild and were thereby deprived of their civic rights.

==== Plebeians ====
The plebeians comprised the new class of urban workers, journeymen and vagabonds. Ruined petty burghers also joined their ranks. Although technically potential burghers, the journeymen were barred from higher positions by the wealthy families that ran the guilds. Thus their "temporary" position devoid of civic rights tended to become permanent. The plebeians did not have property like ruined burghers or peasants. They were landless, rightless citizens, and a symptom of the decay of feudal society. It was in Thuringia that the revolution which centered around Müntzer would give the plebeian working class the greatest expression. They demanded complete social equality as they began to believe, with Müntzer's encouragement, that the evolution of their society should be driven by themselves from below, not from above. The authorities hastened to put down such explosive aspirations, which posed the greatest threat to their traditional authority.

==== Peasants ====
The lowest stratum of society continued to be occupied by peasants, who were heavily taxed. In the early 16th century, no peasant could hunt, fish or chop wood freely, as the lords had recently taken these common lands for their own purposes. The lord had the right to use his peasant's land as he wished; the peasant could do nothing but watch as his crops were destroyed by wild game and by nobles galloping across his fields in the course of their chivalric hunts. When a peasant wished to marry, he needed not only the lord's permission, but to pay a tax. When the peasant died, the lord was entitled to his best cattle, his best garments and his best tools. The justice system, operated by the clergy or wealthy burgher and patrician jurists, gave the peasant no redress. Generations of traditional servitude and the autonomous nature of the provinces limited peasant insurrections to local areas. The peasant's only hope was the unification of aspirations across provincial lines. Müntzer was to recognize that the recently diluted class structures provided the lower stratum of society with a greater claim to legitimacy in their revolt, as well as more scope for political and socio-economic gains.

=== Rise of social conflict ===
The emergence of the newer classes and their respective interests began to soften the structure of authority of the old feudal system. Increased international trade and industry not only put the princes in conflict with the interests of the growing merchant capitalist class, but also broadened the base of lower-class interests (the peasants plus the new urban workers). The interposition of the burghers and the necessary plebeian class weakened feudal authority, as both these classes opposed the top of the hierarchy while also being in natural opposition to each other. The emergence of the plebeian class strengthened lower-class interests in several ways. Instead of the peasantry being the only oppressed and traditionally servile estate, the plebeians added a new dimension that shared similar class interests, but did so without a history of outright oppression.

Opposition to the privileges of the Catholic clergy was rising among several classes in the new late-medieval hierarchy, including the peasantry. Many burghers and nobles also despised the perceived laziness and looseness of clerical life. As members of the more privileged classes by virtue of entrepreneurship and tradition respectively, they felt that the clergy was reaping benefits (such as tax exemption and ecclesiastical tithes) to which they were not entitled. When the situation suited, even princes would abandon Catholicism in order to gain political and financial independence and increase their power within their territories.

After thousands of articles of complaints were compiled and presented by the lower classes in numerous towns and villages to no avail, the revolt broke out. The parties split into three distinct groups. The Catholic camp consisted of the clergy plus those patricians and princes who resisted any opposition to the Catholic-centred social order. The moderate reforming party consisted mainly of burghers and princes. The burghers saw an opportunity to gain power in the urban councils, as Luther's proposed reformed church would be highly centralized within the towns, as well as condemning the nepotistic practices by which the patricians held a firm grip on the bureaucracy. Similarly, the princes stood to gain additional autonomy not only from the Catholic emperor Charles V, but from the demands of the Catholic Church in Rome. Plebeians, peasants and those sympathetic to their cause made up the third camp, which was led by preachers like Thomas Müntzer. This camp wished to break the shackles of late medieval society and forge a new one in the name of God.

Germany's peasants and plebeians compiled lists of articles outlining their complaints. The famous 12 Articles of the Black Forest were ultimately adopted as the definitive set of grievances. The articles' statement of social, political and economic grievances in the increasingly popular Protestant movement unified the population in the massive uprising that broke out first in Lower Swabia in 1524, then quickly spread to other parts of Germany.

=== Ultimate failure of the rebellion ===
The peasant movement ultimately failed, with cities and nobles making separate peaces with the princely armies that restored the old order in a frequently still-harsher incarnation under the nominal overlordship of the Holy Roman Emperor Charles V, represented in German affairs by his younger brother Ferdinand.

The religious dissident Martin Luther, already condemned as a heretic by the 1521 Edict of Worms and accused at the time of fomenting the strife, rejected the demands of the rebels and upheld the right of Germany's rulers to suppress the uprisings. Luther based his attitude on the peasant rebellion on St. Paul's doctrine of Divine Right of Kings in his epistle to the Romans 13:1–7, which says that all authorities are appointed by God, and should not be resisted. His former follower Thomas Müntzer, on the other hand, came to the fore as a radical agitator in Thuringia.

=== Anabaptists ===
On December 27, 1521, three Zwickau prophets, both influenced by and influencing Thomas Müntzer, appeared in Wittenberg from Zwickau: Thomas Dreschel, Nicolas Storch and Mark Thomas Stübner. Luther's reform was not radical enough for them. Like the Roman Catholic Church, Luther practiced infant baptism, which the Anabaptists considered to be "neither scriptural nor primitive, nor fulfilling the chief conditions of admission into a visible brotherhood of saints, to wit, repentance, faith, spiritual illumination and free surrender of self to Christ."

The reformist theologian and associate of Luther, Philipp Melanchthon, who was powerless against the enthusiasts with whom his co-reformer Andreas Karlstadt sympathized, appealed to Luther, who was still hiding in the Wartburg. Luther was cautious in not condemning the new doctrine out of hand, but advised Melanchthon to treat its supporters gently and to test their spirits, in case they should be of God. There was confusion in Wittenberg, whose schools and university had sided with the "prophets" and were closed. From this arises the allegation that the Anabaptists were enemies of learning, which is contradicted by the fact that two of them, Haetzer and Denck, produced and printed the first German translation of the Hebrew prophets in 1527. The first leaders of the movement in Zürich—Conrad Grebel, Felix Manz, George Blaurock, Balthasar Hubmaier—were learned in Greek, Latin and Hebrew.

On March 6, 1522, Luther returned to Wittenberg, where he interviewed the prophets, scorned their "spirits", banished them from the city, and had their adherents ejected from Zwickau and Erfurt. Denied access to the churches, the latter preached and celebrated the sacrament in private houses. Having been driven from the cities, they swarmed across the countryside. Compelled to leave Zwickau, Müntzer visited Bohemia, lived for two years at Alltstedt in Thuringia, and in 1524 spent some time in Switzerland. During this period he proclaimed his revolutionary religious and political doctrines with increasing vehemence, and, so far as the lower orders were concerned, with growing success.

The Peasants' War began chiefly as a revolt against feudal oppression, but under the leadership of Müntzer it became a war against all constituted authorities in a forcible attempt to establish Müntzer's ideal of a Christian commonwealth based on absolute equality and the community of goods. The total defeat of the rebels at Frankenhausen (May 15, 1525), followed by the execution of Müntzer and several other leaders, proved to be a merely temporary check on the Anabaptist movement. Scattered throughout Germany, Switzerland and the Netherlands were zealous propagandists whose teachings many were prepared to follow as soon as another leader emerged.
