= Ludwig Haetzer =

German Anabaptist (1500–1529)

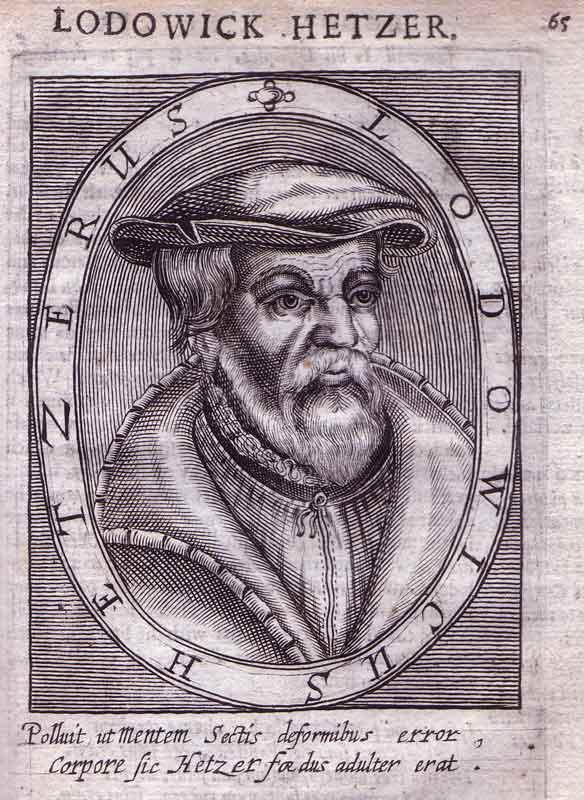
Ludwig Haetzer

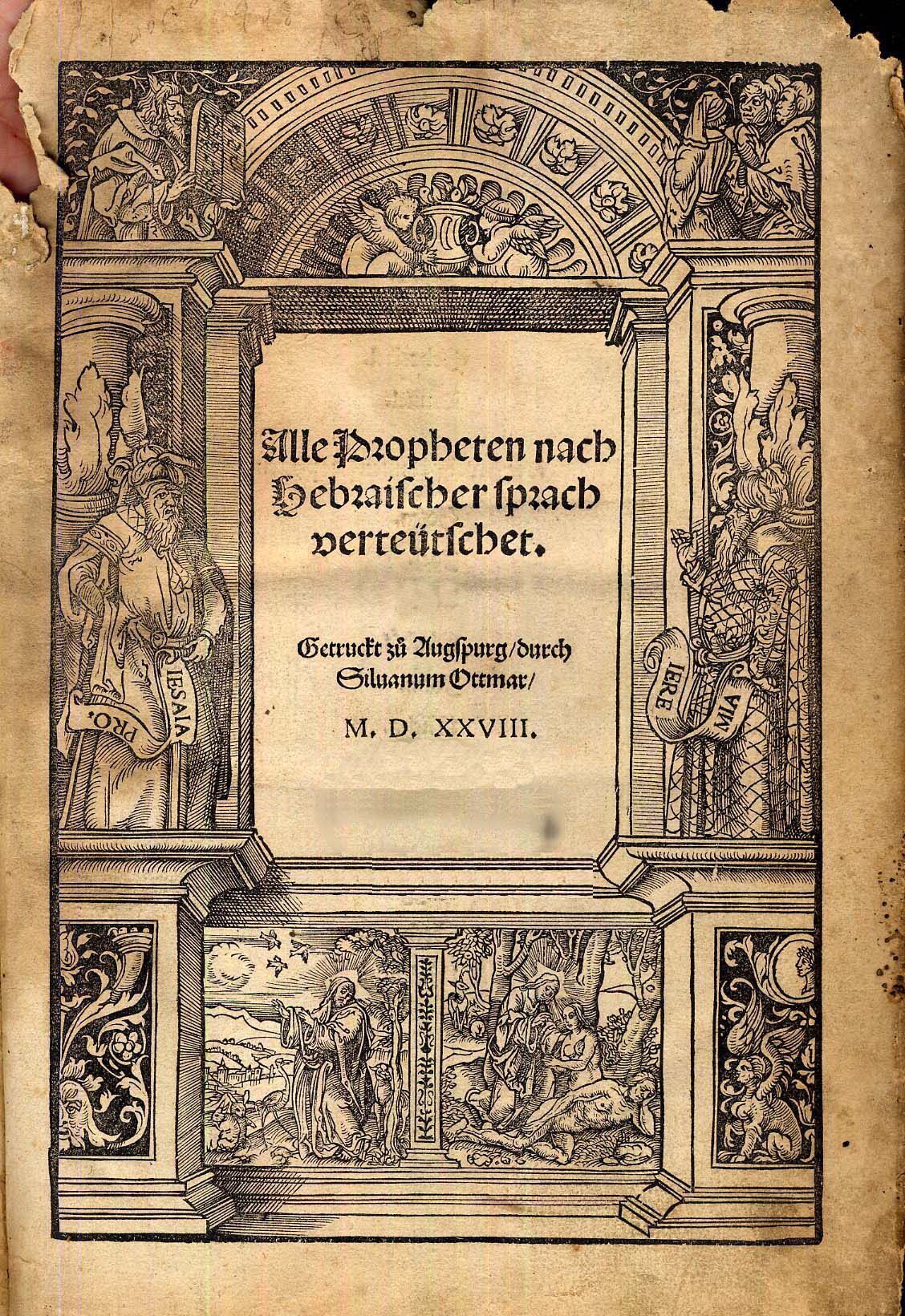
Title page, Alle Propheten nach Hebraischer sprach, German translation of Old Testament prophets by Ludwig Haetzer and Hans Denck, Augsburg, 1528

Ludwig Haetzer (also Ludwig Hetzer, Ludwig Hätzer and sometimes Ludwig Hatzer) (1500 – 4 February 1529) was an Anabaptist.

He wrote against the uses of images in worship, translated some Latin evangelical texts regarding the conversion of Jews, and, together with Hans Denck, he translated the prophets of the Bible into German in 1528. Haetzer also wrote a booklet discouraging the consumption of alcohol. He regarded Jesus as a leader and teacher only; not divine and not an object of worship, therefore an anti-trinitarian and possibly a Unitarian. He was eventually executed for his Anabaptist radicalism.

== Life ==
Haetzer was born in Bischofszell, Thurgau, Switzerland. He studied at Freiburg im Breisgau, and began his career in a chaplaincy at Wädenswil, on Lake Zurich. At this time his attachment to the old faith was tempered by a mystical turn, and by a devotion to the prophetical writings of the Old Testament, which he studied in the original. By 1523 he was in Zürich, where he published, at first anonymously and in Latin (Judicium Dei), and later, on 24 September 1523, with his name and in German, a small tract against the religious use of images, and bearing the motto attached to all his subsequent works, O Got erlösz die (or dein) Gefangnen ("O God, set the prisoners free"). An attempt to give effect to the teaching of this frequently reprinted tract was followed by a public religious disputation, of which Haetzer drew up the official account.

In 1524 he brought out a tract on the conversion of the Jews, and published a German version of Johannes Bugenhagen's brief exposition of the epistles of St Paul (Ephesians to Hebrews). In the dedication (dated Zürich, 29 June 1524) he undertook to translate Bugenhagen's comment on the Psalter. He then went to Augsburg, bearing Huldrych Zwingli's introduction to Johann Frosch. Here he came for a time under the influence of Urbanus Rhegius, and was for a short time the guest of Georg Regel. Returning to Zürich, he was in communication with leading Anabaptists (though his own position was simply the disuse of infant baptism) until their expulsion in January 1525.

Again resorting to Augsburg, and resuming work as corrector of the press for his printer Silvan Ottmar, he pushed his views to the extreme of rejecting all sacraments, reaching something like the mystical standpoint of the early Quakers. He was expelled from Augsburg in the autumn of 1525, and made his way through Konstanz to Basel, where Johannes Oecolampadius received him kindly. He translated into German the first treatise of Oecolampadius on the Last Supper, and proceeding to Zürich in November, published his version there in February 1526, with a preface disclaiming connexion with the Anabaptists. His relations with Zwingli were difficult; returning to Basel he published on 18 July 1526 his translation of the Book of Malachi, with Oecolampadius's exposition, and with a preface reflecting on Zwingli. This he followed by a version of the Book of Isaiah, chapters 36–37. He next went to Strassburg, and was received by Wolfgang Capito.

At Strassburg in the late autumn of 1526 he fell in with Hans Denck (or Dengk), who collaborated with him in the production of his magnum opus, the translation of the Hebrew Prophets, Alle Propheten nach hebraischer Sprach vertuetscht. The preface is dated Worms, 3 April 1527, and there were later editions in that and the following year. It was the first Protestant version of the prophets in German, preceding Luther's by five years, and highly spoken of by him. Haetzer and Denck now entered on a propagandist mission from place to place, with some success, but of short duration. Denck died at Basel in November 1527. Haetzer was arrested at Konstanz in the summer of 1528. After long imprisonment and many examinations he was condemned on 3 February 1529 to die by the sword, and the sentence was executed on the following day. His demeanour on the scaffold impressed impartial witnesses, Johannes Zwick and Ambrosius Blarer, who speak warmly of his fervour and courage. The Dutch Baptist Martyrology describes him as "a servant of Jesus Christ." The Moravian Chronicle says "he was condemned for the sake of divine truth."

His papers included an unpublished treatise against the essential deity of Christ, which was suppressed by Zwingli; the only extant evidence of his anti-trinitarian views being contained in eight lines of German verse preserved in Sebastian Frank's Chronica. The discovery of his heterodox Christology (which has led modern Unitarians to regard him as their proto-martyr) was followed by charges of loose living, never heard of in his lifetime, and without evidence or probability.

== See also ==
- George Blaurock
- Conrad Grebel
- Balthasar Hubmaier
- Jacob Kautz
- Felix Manz
- Adam Pastor
