= Peter Schöffer the Younger =

German printer (1480–1547)

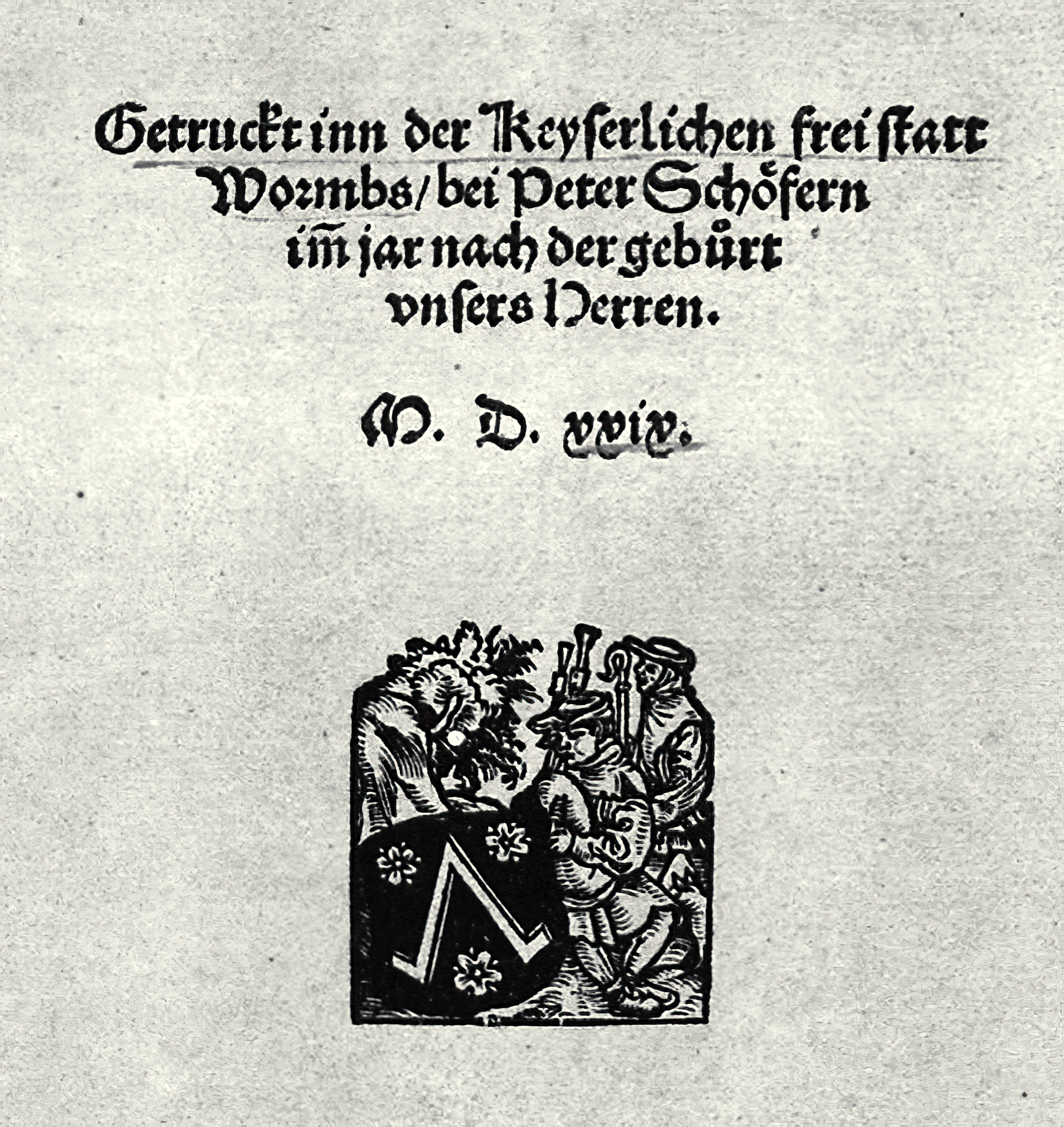
Colophon of Schöffer's Worms Bible, 1529

Peter Schöffer the Younger (c. 1480–1547) was a German printer, the son of Peter Schöffer, a former apprentice of Johannes Gutenberg, and a grandson of Gutenberg's financier Johann Fust. He first worked in Mainz, where he set up his first workshop. He was an expert type caster, and his specialty was printing music. Schöffer moved to Worms in 1518, where he printed among other works the Tyndale Bible, which was the first mass-produced English edition of the New Testament, and the first complete German Protestant translation of the Bible. Later in life, he also worked in Straßburg, Venice and Basel.

== Family background and early life ==
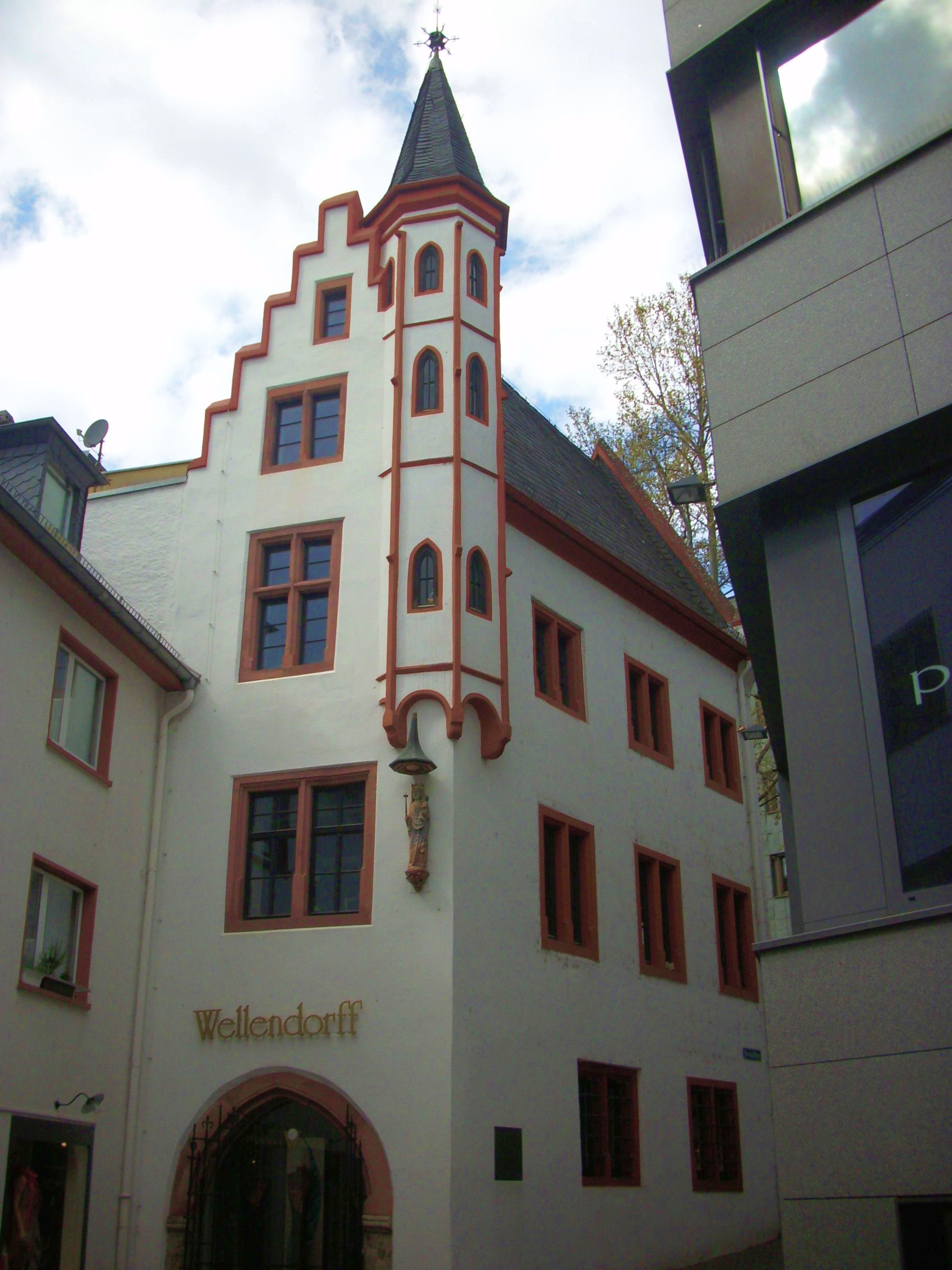
Haus zum Korb, Mainz

Schöffer was born in Mainz between 1475 and 1480, into a family involved in the early printing business. His father was Peter Schöffer (c. 1425–1503), who had been an apprentice with Johannes Gutenberg. His mother was Christina Fust, the only daughter of Johann Fust, who had lent money to Gutenberg and taken over his print shop after Gutenberg defaulted on his loans. Schöffer learned the trades of punchcutter and type caster. He became very skilled in this; his types were later also used in his brother's workshop and traded to other cities. He married Katharina, of unknown last name, and they had a son, Ivo (c. 1500–1555), who also became a printer. Katharina died before 1530, likely in Worms. After his father's death c. 1503, the print workshop was taken over by his brother Johann Schöffer. Peter Schöffer the Younger inherited the "zum Korb" house in Mainz and set up his workshop there c. 1509. He sold the house in 1512.

The first book printed by Schöffer was Responsoria Moguntina c. 1510, but his specialty was the printing of music. He cast type for mensural notation, imitating very closely the style of Ottaviano Petrucci. His first printed work with musical notation was a tablature book for organ and lute, Tabulaturen etlicher Lobgesang und Lidlein uff die Orgel, und Lauten in 1512. Under the title Quinquagena Carminum, he reprinted Petrucci's Canti B songbook in February 1513.

== Printer in Worms ==
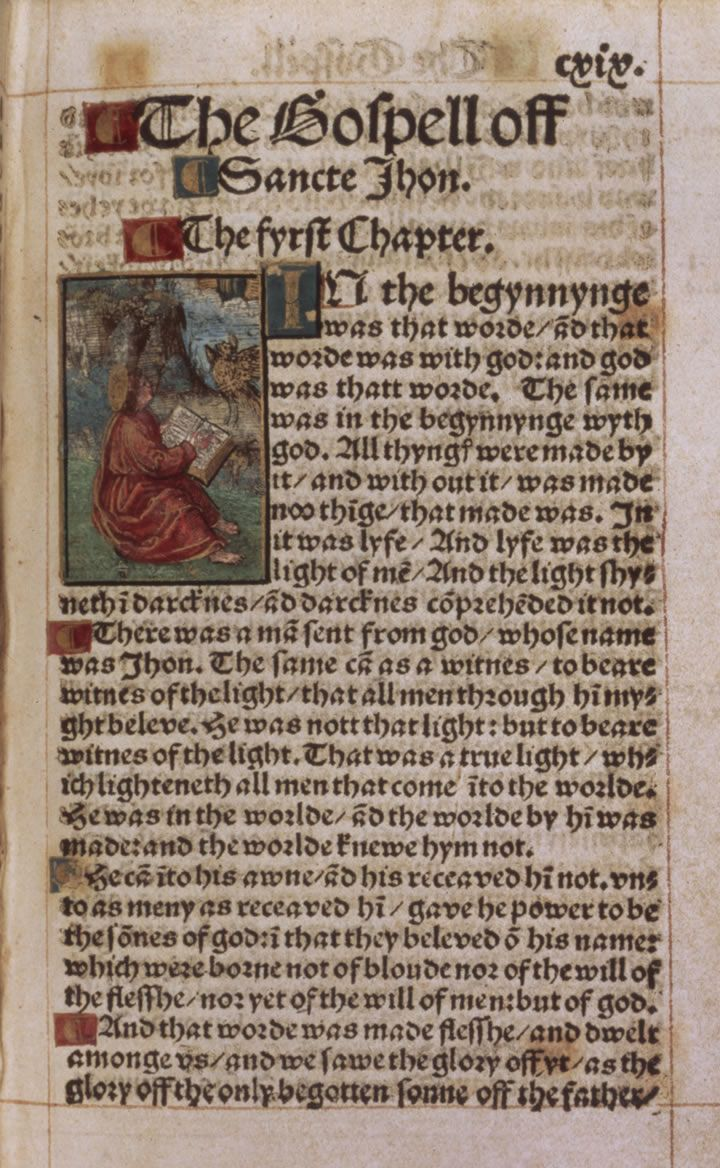
Gospel of John, from the Tyndale Bible

Schöffer moved to Worms in 1518, where he came in contact with the Anabaptists. While in Worms, Schöffer printed the first New Testament in English in 1526, the Tyndale Bible, translated from the Greek by William Tyndale. Unlike Tyndall's earlier fragment printed in Cologne, it is a complete New Testament. To smuggle copies to England, the books were hidden in bales of cloth and transported in ships along the Rhine. Although the book was printed in an edition of 6000 octavo copies, only three of them have survived, and just one of these contains the title page, the copy found in 1996 in an old Bible collection in Stuttgart.

In 1527, Schöffer printed the first complete German translation of the prophetic books from the Hebrew Bible, made by the Anabaptist scholars Ludwig Haetzer and Hans Denck. Martin Luther owned a copy. The title frame of this book, the Worms Prophets, is the same as that used in the Stuttgart copy of the Tyndale Bible. In 1529, Schöffer printed the first complete German Protestant Bible, the Worms Bible. It was a compilation made by the Anabaptist preacher Jacob Kautz, who combined his own translations with those of Luther and parts of Ulrich Zwingli's Zürich Bible. The prophetic books in this Bible were not the same as those of the Worms Prophets, but the Zürich version, which had in turn been influenced by Haetzer and Denck's translation. A prosecution of Anabaptist pursuits was announced in Worms in May 1529 based on decisions at the Diet of Speyer, and the Anabaptists were expelled.

== Later life ==
In September 1529, Schöffer moved to Straßburg. It is not known whether this was caused by the treatment of Anabaptists in Worms. He soon after married Anna Pfintzner, a local widow, and obtained citizenship on 14 December 1529. In Straßburg, Schöffer collaborated with Matthias Apiarius. Among other works, they printed a treatise on music theory. He moved on to Basel before 1539, and spent some time in Venice in 1541/42. In Venice, he printed a New Testament in Latin and an edition of the alchemistical Summa perfectionis magisterii. He then returned to Basel, where he died in January 1547.
