= Swiss Brethren =

Branch of Anabaptism

The Swiss Brethren (German: Schweizer Brüder) are a branch of Anabaptism that started in Zürich, spread to nearby cities and towns, and then was exported to neighboring countries. Today's Swiss Mennonite Conference can be traced to the Swiss Brethren.

In 1525, Felix Manz, Conrad Grebel, George Blaurock and other radical evangelical reformers broke from Ulrich Zwingli and formed a new group because they felt reforms were not moving fast enough.

Rejection of infant baptism was a distinguishing belief of the Swiss Brethren. On the basis of Sola scriptura doctrine, the Swiss Brethren declared that since the Bible does not explicitly mention infant baptism, it should not be practiced by the church. This belief was subsequently rejected by Ulrich Zwingli. Consequently, there was a public dispute, in which the council affirmed Zwingli's position. This solidified the Swiss Brethren and resulted in their persecution by all other reformers as well as the Catholic Church.

Because of persecution by the authorities, many Swiss Brethren moved from Switzerland to neighboring countries. The Swiss Brethren became known as Mennonites after the division of 1693, a disagreement between groups led by Jakob Ammann and Hans Reist. Many of the Mennonites in France, Southern Germany, the Netherlands, and North America, as well as most Amish, descend from the Swiss Brethren.

== Schleitheim Articles ==
In 1527 Michael Sattler authored the Schleitheim Articles, the first Anabaptist confession of faith. It contained seven articles on the following topics:

- Believer's baptism
- Church discipline
- Lord's Supper
- Separation from the world and evil
- Selection and role of pastors
- Nonviolence (nonresistance)
- Prohibition of oath-swearing

Most Swiss Brethren accepted these seven articles.

== Key leaders ==
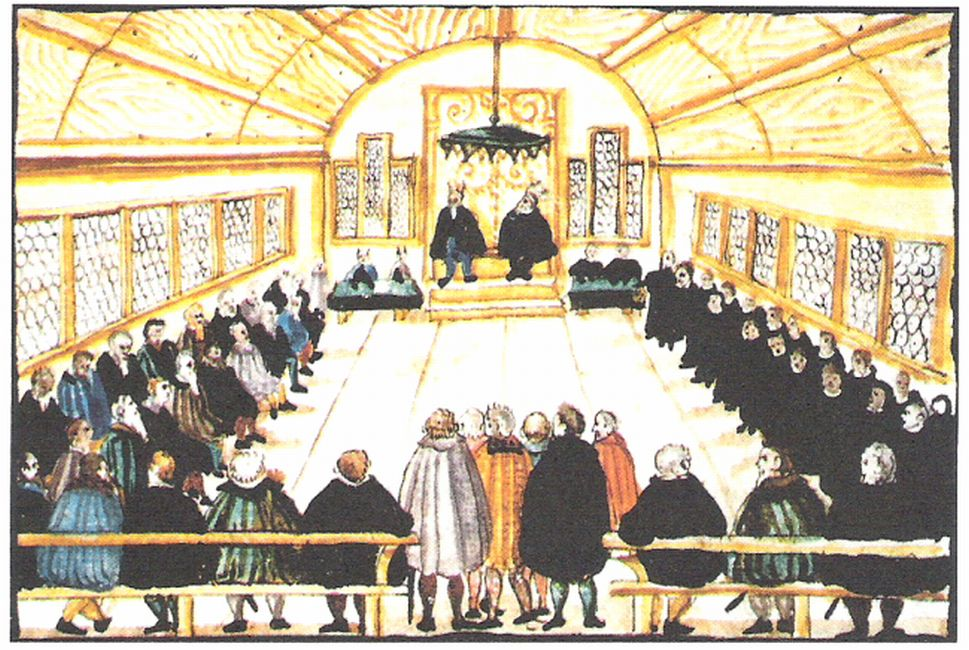
Dissatisfaction with the outcome of a disputation in 1525 prompted a group to part ways with Huldrych Zwingli.

George Blaurock (Bonaduz, c. 1491 – 1529) was a co-founder of the Swiss Brethren movement. He was educated at the University of Leipzig and served as a priest, but departed from the Catholic Church before he arrived in Zürich around 1524, for he had already taken a wife. Though he came to see Huldrych Zwingli, he soon became attached to the reformer's more radical followers. After a break with Zwingli in January 1525 and acting against a Zürich city council ruling, Blaurock asked Conrad Grebel to baptize him upon a confession of faith in Christ. Grebel did so, and afterwards Blaurock proceeded to baptize the others who were present. Blaurock worked closely with Felix Manz until Manz was martyred in Zürich in 1527. On that same day, Blaurock was severely beaten and permanently expelled from Zürich. He kept moving, laboring at Bern, Biel, the Grisons, and Appenzell. After his arrest and fourth banishment in 1527, Blaurock left Switzerland never to return. He conducted a very successful ministry in Tyrol. In August 1529 he was arrested by Innsbruck authorities and tortured for information. On 6 September 1529, Blaurock was burned at the stake near Klausen.

Conrad Grebel (c. 1498 – 1526) was a co-founder of the Swiss Brethren movement. He was probably born in Grüningen about 1498. His family moved to Zürich around 1513. Grebel spent about six years in three universities, but without finishing his education or receiving a degree. In 1521 he joined a group gathered around Zürich reformer Huldrych Zwingli to study the Greek classics, the Latin Bible, the Hebrew Old Testament and the Greek New Testament. Core members of the group broke with Zwingli because they thought the reform process was proceeding too slowly. At a gathering in January 1525 George Blaurock asked Grebel to baptize him upon a confession of faith. Afterward, Blaurock baptized Grebel and the others, initiating a wave of rebaptisms that would spread throughout the Swiss cantons. Grebel died of the plague in 1526.

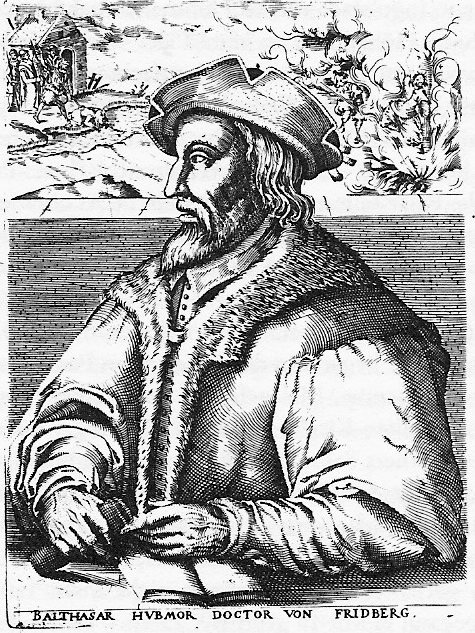
Balthasar Hubmaier was the foremost theologian of the Swiss Brethren.

Balthasar Hubmaier (c. 1480 – 1528) was one of the most well-known and respected Anabaptist theologians of the Reformation. He was born in Friedberg, Bavaria around 1480. In 1524, he married Elizabeth Hügline of Reichenau. He attended Latin School at Augsburg, received both a bachelor's and a master's degree from the University of Freiburg in 1511 and a doctor's degree from the University of Ingolstadt under Johann Eck in 1512. After serving as the university's vice-rector, he left a pastorate of the Catholic Church at Regensburg in 1516 and then went to Waldshut in 1521. He was rebaptised there in 1525 by Wilhelm Reublin. He succeeded in establishing Anabaptism as the official religion for a short period first in Waldshut and then in Nikolsburg. On 10 March 1528 Hubmaier was executed by burning for heresy.

Felix Manz (c. 1498 – 1527) was a co-founder of the Swiss Brethren movement. Manz was the illegitimate son of a canon of the Grossmünster in Zürich. His knowledge of Hebrew, Greek and Latin indicate a liberal education. Manz became a follower of Huldrych Zwingli and when Conrad Grebel joined the group in 1521, he and Manz became friends. They questioned the mass, the nature of church and state connections, and infant baptism. The Zürich city council declared Zwingli the victor of a January 1525 disputation and ordered the group to desist from arguing and submit to the decision of the council. Instead, the group gathered at the home of Felix Manz and his mother. Conrad Grebel rebaptized George Blaurock, and Blaurock in turn rebaptized the others. Manz proceeded to use his language skills to translate religious texts into the language of the people, and worked enthusiastically as an evangelist. Manz was arrested on a number of occasions between 1525 and 1527. While he preached with George Blaurock in the Grüningen region, they were taken by surprise, arrested and imprisoned in Zürich at the Wellenburg prison. The Zürich council had passed an edict that made adult rebaptism punishable by drowning. On 5 January 1527, Felix Manz became the first casualty of the edict, and the first of the Swiss Brethren to be executed at the hands of Protestants.

Hans Reist (fl. 1670 – 1704) was a central figure in the dispute that resulted in the formation of the Amish branch. Reist favored a milder form of church discipline and was strongly opposed by Jakob Ammann who advocated a strict form of the ban. The disagreement was fierce and the ill feelings generated by the exchange between Reist, Ammann, and other leaders resulted in an unrepairable breach. Reist is recognized as a leader of the Swiss Brethren group that later adopted the name Mennonite.

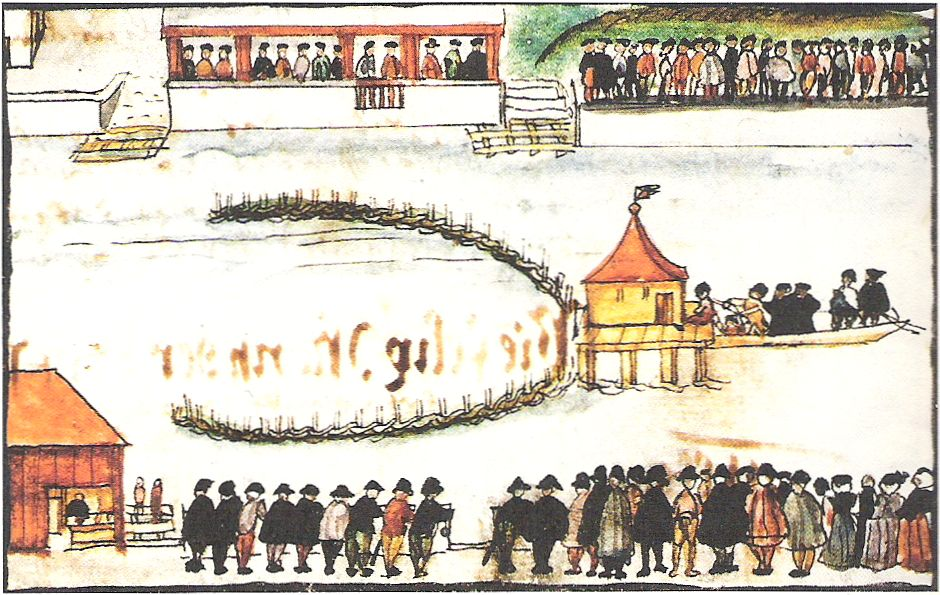
Felix Manz was executed by drowning within two years of his rebaptism.

Wilhelm Reublin (1484 – c. 1559) was a prolific Swiss Brethren missionary who eventually left the movement. Reublin was born in 1484 in Rottenburg am Neckar. In 1521, after having studied theology in Freiburg and Tübingen, he pastored at St. Alban in Basel then in Witikon. Reublin was with Conrad Grebel and Felix Manz in Zürich in January 1525 at the birth of the Anabaptist movement. Reublin took part in a disputation on 17 January 1525 after which Grebel, Mantz and Reublin were given eight days to leave the canton. Reublin proceeded to Hallau, where he established a large Anabaptist congregation. From Hallau, Reublin successfully evangelized in other areas for the young Anabaptist movement. On Easter 1525, he baptized theologian Balthasar Hubmaier in Waldshut, where another center of Anabaptism was developing. Michael Sattler was baptized by Reublin in Rottenburg. Other places evangelized by Reublin include Schaffhausen, Strasbourg, Reutlingen and Esslingen. By 1535, Reublin had left the Swiss Brethren.

Michael Sattler (c. 1490 – 1527) was particularly influential for his role in developing the Schleitheim Confession. Born around 1490 in Staufen, Germany, Sattler became a Benedictine monk in the cloister of St. Peter and most likely became prior by the time he left, around 1525. He then married Margaretha, a former Beguine. That year they traveled to Zürich, which was then embroiled in controversy over infant baptism, and was expelled from the city in November. He became associated with the Anabaptists and was probably rebaptised in the summer of 1526. He was involved in missionary activity around Horb and Rottenburg, and eventually traveled to Strasbourg. In February 1527 he chaired a meeting of the Swiss Brethren at Schleitheim, at which time the Schleitheim Confession was adopted. In May 1527, Sattler was arrested by Roman Catholic authorities, along with his wife and several other Anabaptists. He was tried and sentenced to be executed as a heretic. Before execution by fire, his tongue was cut out, and red hot tongs were used to tear two pieces of flesh from his body. Margaretha was executed by drowning.

Jakob Ammann (fl. 1696 – before 1730) was an elder who became the founder of the Amish Mennonites. Ammann advocated the strictest form of the ban, insisting that there be no contact with an excommunicated member, even among family members. He had firm views on clothing style, opposed trimmed beards and introduced foot washing. He traveled among the Swiss Anabaptist communities in the cantons of Switzerland, Alsace and the Palatinate, promoting his views and excommunicating any who opposed him. Because of his unbending convictions and harsh rhetoric, an irreparable breach developed between the two groups that continues centuries later in North America. Ammann later regretted his contribution to the split and asked for forgiveness, but by 1700 the rift was too great.

== Early locations ==
In Appenzell, a congregation of 1,500 formed soon after the movement was driven from Zürich. Zwingli complained that the canton was too tolerant of Anabaptists. Increased enforcement of anti-Anabaptist decrees drove most congregations out by 1530, although some persisted into the 17th century.

=== Others ===
- Alsace
- Basel
- Bern
- Hallau
- Moravia
- Palatinate (region)
- Schaffhausen
- St. Gallen
- Strasbourg
- Waldshut
- Zollikon
- Zürich
