= Wilhelm Reublin =

Wilhelm Reublin (1484 – c. 1559) was a leading figure of the Swiss Brethren movement. Reublin was born in 1484 in Rottenburg am Neckar. In 1521, after having studied theology in Freiburg and Tübingen, Reublin became the pastor at St. Alban in Basel and began to advocate reform. St. Alban was soon the center of the evangelical movement in Basel. In the Fall of 1522 Reublin was expelled from the city for his Reformation sermons and moved to Witikon in 1524, where he became the local pastor and preached against infant baptism. Reublin was with Conrad Grebel and Felix Manz in Zürich in January 1525 at the birth of the Anabaptist movement. Reublin took part in a disputation on 17 January 1525 after which Grebel, Manz and Reublin were given eight days to leave the canton.

Reublin proceeded to Hallau, with John Brötli, who had been in the region of Schaffhausen since 1521. They soon established a large Anabaptist congregation there. From Hallau Reublin successfully evangelized in other areas for the young Anabaptist movement. On Easter 1525 he baptized the theologian Balthasar Hubmaier in Waldshut, where another center of the Anabaptism was developing. Later Michael Sattler was baptized by Reublin in Rottenburg. Other places evangelized by Reublin include Schaffhausen, Strasbourg, Reutlingen and Esslingen. After an arrest in Strasbourg in the Winter of 1528–29, Reublin wandered with other Swiss Brethren to Auspitz in Moravia where the first farms of the Hutterites were established. After a dispute over the sharing of personal resources and money, Reublin was banned from the local community and returned to southwest Germany in 1531, where he was again evangelizing in Rottenburg. Sometime later he left the Anabaptist movement. Around 1535 Reublin was in correspondence with the Reformed theologian Heinrich Bullinger. In August 1554 Reublin appears once in Basel. Little is known about his last years.
