= Swiss Mennonite Conference =

The Swiss Mennonite Conference (also Konferenz der Mennoniten der Schweiz or Conférence Mennonite Suisse) is an Anabaptist Christian body in Switzerland.

The Swiss Mennonites are the oldest and were possibly the most influential body of Anabaptists at some time. The earliest recorded Anabaptist movement during Reformation times originated in the village of Zollikon near Zürich in 1525. Conrad Grebel (ca. 1496–1526) and Felix Manz (ca. 1496–1527), followers of Huldrych Zwingli, divided from Zwingli on the issue of infant baptism versus believers baptism. They organized in the home of Manz on January 21, 1525. Though Grebel and Manz were dead within two years—Grebel of the plague and Manz drowned by the Council of Zürich—the believers' baptism movement quickly spread through German-speaking Switzerland. On the day of Manz' execution, another leader, George Blaurock, was beaten and expelled from the city. From there, he travelled to Bern and eventually left Switzerland, never to return. Bern became the center for Anabaptism in Switzerland.

The movement spread, both by evangelistic zeal and persecution, from Switzerland into Germany, Moravia, Poland, Russia, the Netherlands, and eventually to North and South America. Around 1671, because of persecution by the government and the state church, a large group of Anabaptists (Mennonites) left Switzerland for the Palatinate in Germany. For many Mennonites, persecution helped institutionalize separation, non-conformity and farming as a way of life. The Amish schism of the Mennonites originated with Jacob Amman in Switzerland. Many Amish Mennonites in America can be traced to the areas of Thun and Schwarzenburg in Canton Bern.

Records of the conferences of the Swiss Mennonites have been consistently recorded since 1889, but various records indicate that an annual conference was an "old custom" in the 18th century. In 1898 a constitution and the name Conference of the Mennonites in Switzerland was adopted.

The Swiss Mennonite Conference is a member of the Federation of Free Churches in Switzerland and the Mennonite World Conference. In 2003 the conference had 2500 members in 14 congregations.

The congregations range in size from 40 to 500. Each church is autonomous and there is much diversity within the conference. A congregation formed in 1991 is the most recent addition to the body. Though the Swiss conference is currently a relatively small body, the Swiss Mennonites have contributed greatly to the spread of Anabaptism across the world.
