= Reist =

Reist is a surname. Notable people with the surname include:

- Alain Reist (born 1979), Swiss ice hockey player
- Chelsey Reist (born 1987), Canadian actress, television host, and dancer
- Dölf Reist (1921-2000), Swiss mountaineer
- Hans Reist (fl. 1670–1704), Swiss Anabaptist elder
- Melinda Tankard Reist (born 1963), Australian writer, speaker, blogger, and media commentator
