= Schöffer =

Schöffer is a German surname. Notable people with the surname include:

- Nicolas Schöffer (1912–1992), Hungarian-born French artist
- Peter Schöffer (c. 1425 – c. 1503), German printer
- Peter Schöffer the Younger (c. 1480 – 1547), German printer, son of Peter Schöffer
