= Hans Reist =

Hans Reist (fl. 1670–1704) was an elder of the Swiss Brethren, an Anabaptist group.

Nothing is known of Reist's background or birthplace. He was probably from the Sumiswald region of Emmental in the Canton of Bern. There were numerous Anabaptists in this area during the 17th century.

Reist was a gifted preacher and had a great influence among his followers in Switzerland, Alsace and Southern Germany. He is noted for leading a group that opposed Jacob Amman. In July or August 1693, a meeting of all Swiss Brethren elders was called to explain their differing beliefs. Hans Reist did not attend the meeting in spite of multiple requests, but explained in writing why he rejected the views of Jacob Amman. No resolution to the differences was found, and the Swiss Brethren separated into the Amish (who used hook-and-eye fasteners) and the followers of Reist (who used buttons). Reist succeeded in convincing a large portion of the region's Anabaptists of his views. They formed the basis of today's Swiss Mennonite Conference and numerous groups of Mennonites in North America.

The date and place of Reist's death are unknown. Hans Reist left no theological writings and has been nearly forgotten, in spite of his significance in Mennonite history.
