= Jacob Kautz =

German Anabaptist (c. 1500–c. 1532)

Jacob Kautz (also Jakob Kautz) (c. 1500 – c. 1532) was a German Anabaptist who posted seven theses to the door of the Worms Cathedral in 1527. He undermined the authority of the church with accusations of idolatry. In essence, he took Martin Luther's protest to the logical conclusion that individual freedom of conscience should be enshrined in law.

The protest claimed that by baptising infants (and by indoctrinating children with church customs), the church was suppressing individual free will. Thus, church supporters were not acting on any decision of their own but merely because they were given no other choice. A soul cannot be saved by force, but only by moral persuasion that leads to a conscious decision to embrace salvation. Baptism must be willingly chosen by an adult who understands the meaning of the act.

The protest also criticized Martin Luther's reformation by claiming that the sacrifice of Jesus is not in itself sufficient atonement for sin, especially the sins of people who lived long after Christ and who had no influence on the events of the past. In other words, belief in Jesus must entail following the guidance of Christ in one's own life. Other Christians labeled this "works righteousness" and claimed that the essence of Christianity is not to be found in doing good works.

Kautz, like many Anabaptists, was a Christian universalist. The fifth of his seven theses was "All that was lost in the first Adam is and will be found more richly restored in the Second Adam, Christ; yea, in Christ shall all men be quickened and blessed forever."

== See also ==
- Hans Denck
- Ludwig Haetzer
- Thomas Muentzer
