= Jakob Ammann =

Anabaptist leader

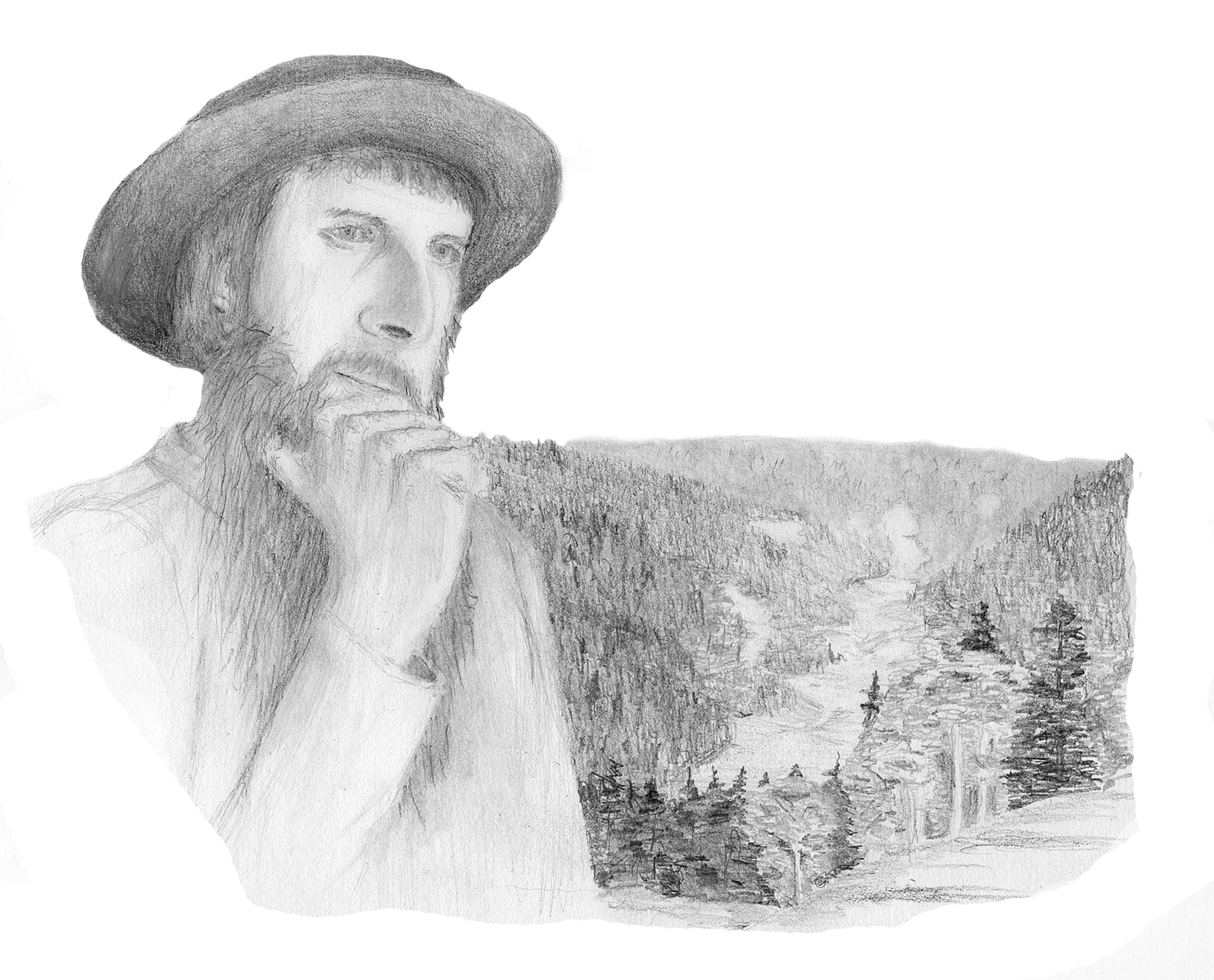
- Jakob Ammann above the valley where his house stood near La Petite Lièpvre, Alsace, France

Personal life
- Born: 12 February 1644 Erlenbach im Simmental, Canton of Bern, Switzerland
- Died: Between October 1712 and 12 April 1730 (aged between 68–86)
- Spouse: Verena (nee Stüdler)

Religious life
- Religion: Anabaptist
- Denomination: Amish
- Church: Swiss Brethren, Amish

Senior posting
- Post: Bishop
- Period in office: Late 1600s – early 1700s

Jakob Ammann (also Jacob Amman, Amann; 12 February 1644 – between 1712 and 1730) was a Swiss Anabaptist leader and the namesake of the Amish religious movement.

== Personal life ==
The full facts about the personal life of Jacob Ammann are incomplete and have been mostly speculative until recent decades. Since the late 1990s, more research has filled in some of the gaps and a basic outline of his life is now conceivable.

=== Early life and family ===
Jakob Ammann was born on 12 February 1644 in Erlenbach im Simmental, Canton of Bern, Switzerland to Michael and Anna (née Rupp) Ammann. Erlenbach church records note the baptism of a Jakob Ammann on 12 February 1644, who was probably Ammann. His grandfather has been identified as Ulrich Ammann. All three Ammanns were tailors. Jakob was third in a family of six children. He probably received limited formal education. On 37 official documents signed by him, only his initials appear, with most of them having a nearby note that Ammann was not able to write so he only "made his mark". However, on three documents, his signed name does appear, although twice it was probably written for him by someone else; once, with the same style of writing as his initials, appear the poorly formed letters "J. AMME", which is assumed to be his own writing. Because he asked for letters to be read in one meeting, it is assumed he was not able to read or could do so only poorly. He did better financially than the average person of his time.

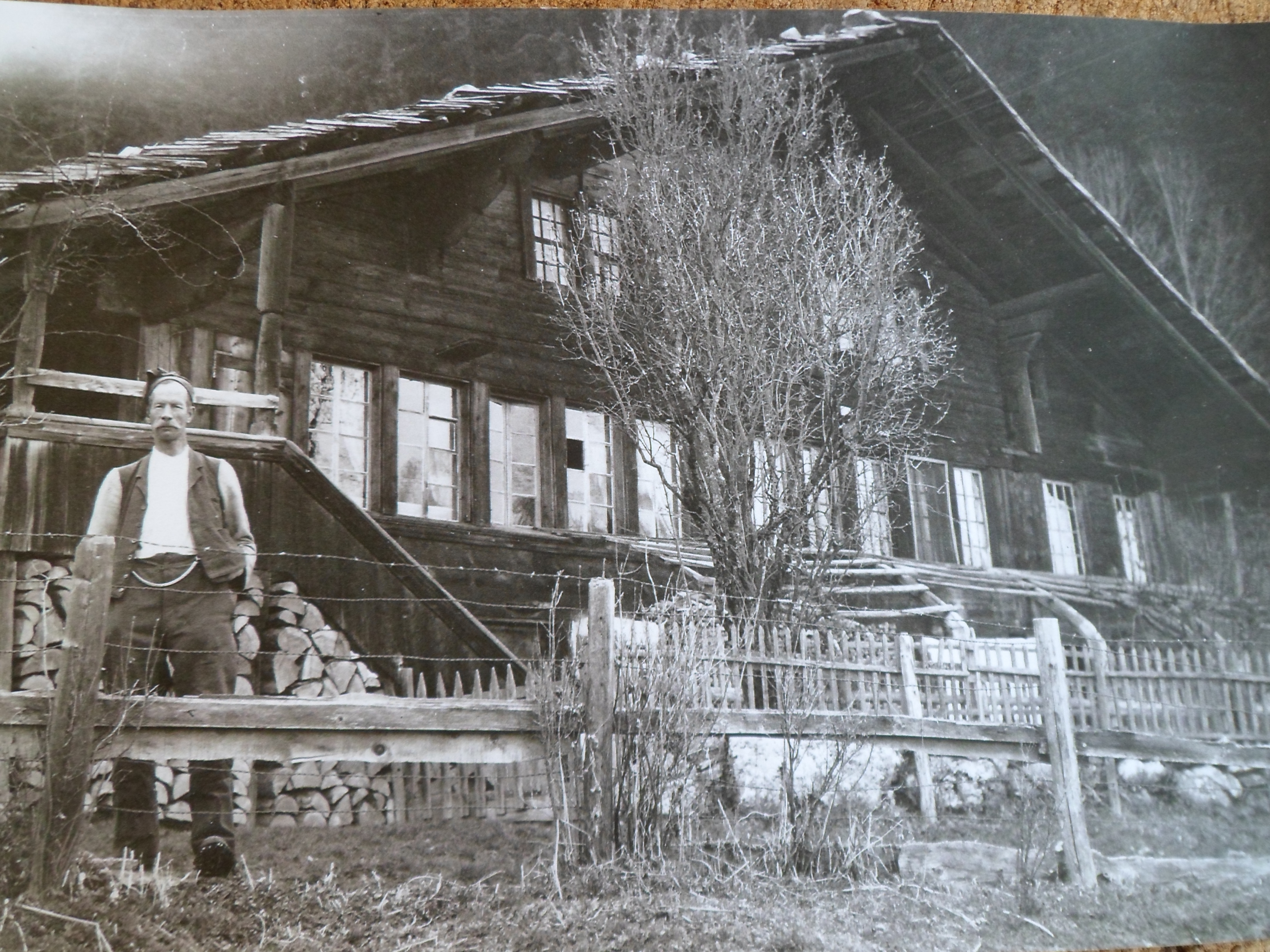
Jakob Amman’s house (dismantled in 1955) from the 17th century in Thal Erlenbach (Photo appr. 1900)

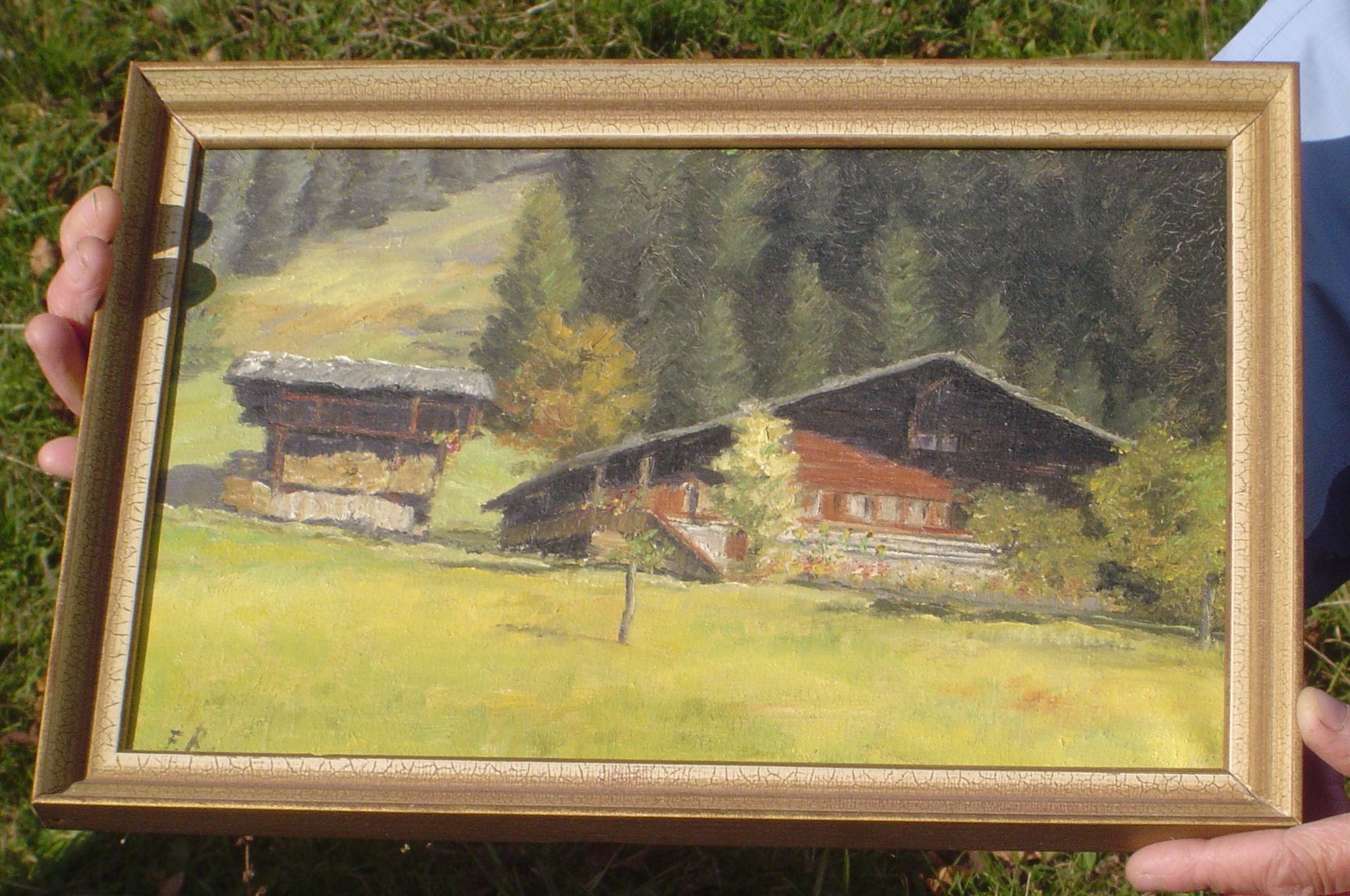
Jakob Amman’s house in Tal Erlenbach on an old painting including the barn

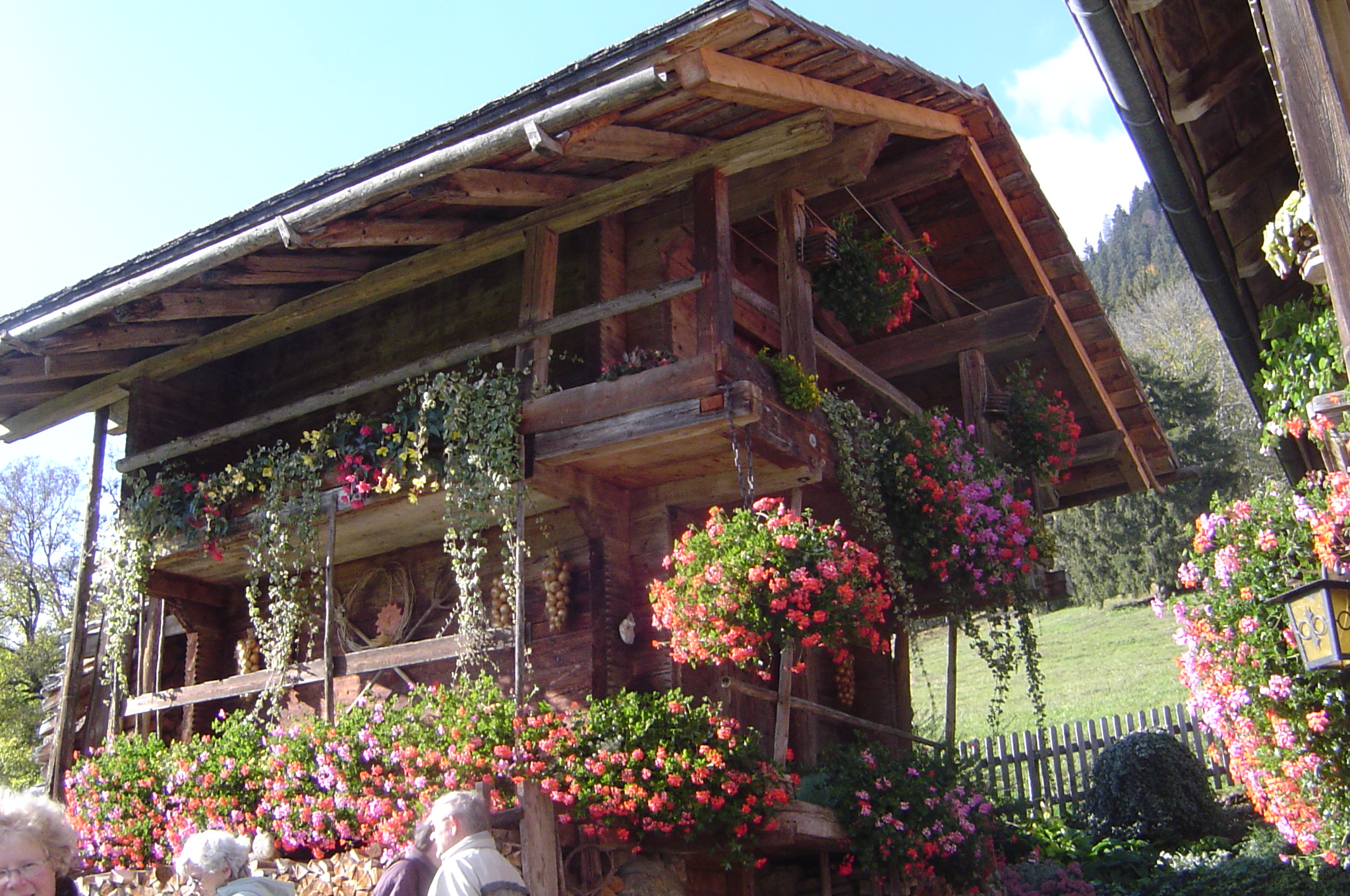
The barn in Tal Erlenbach from the 17th century today

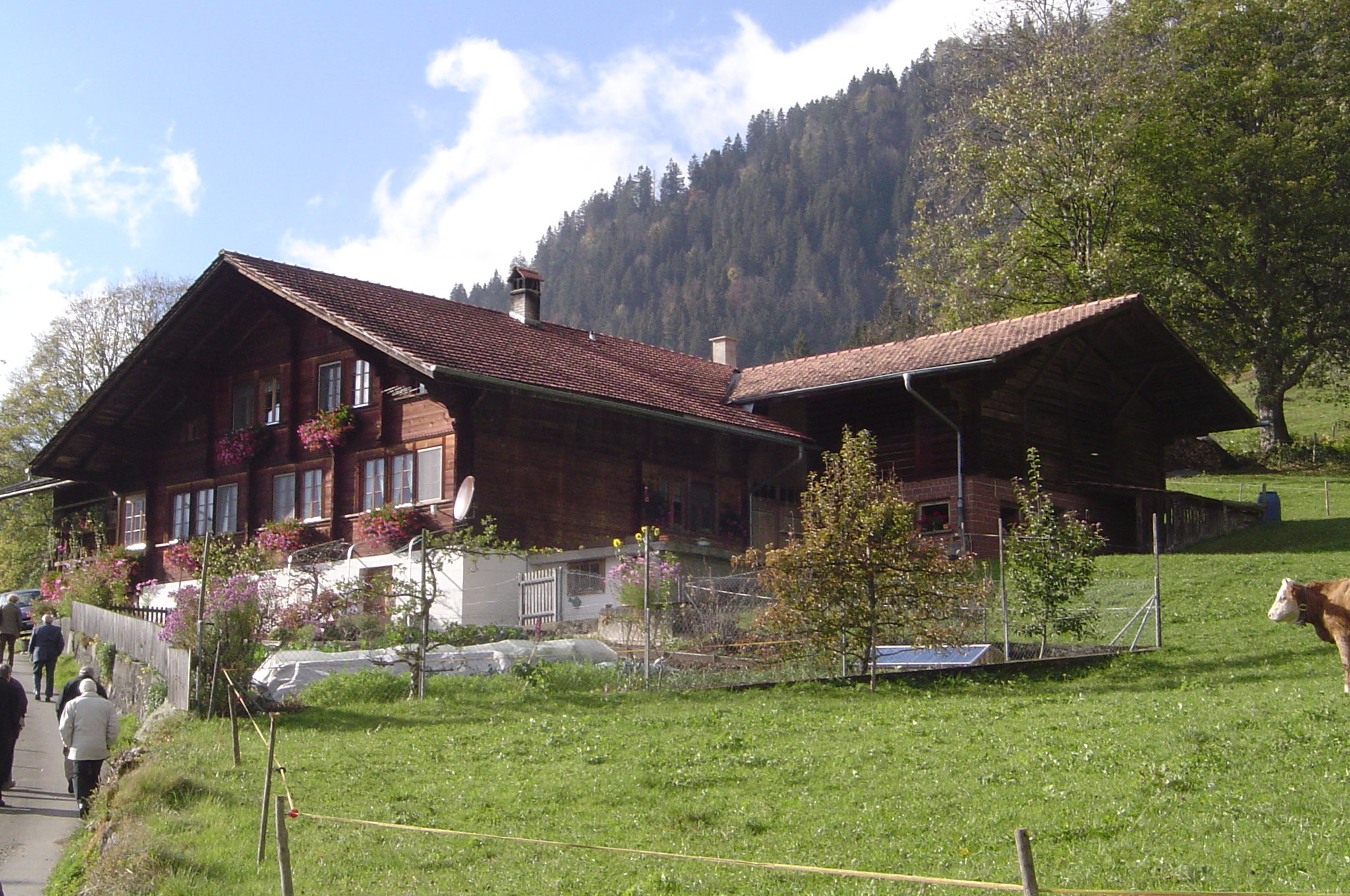
The new house built in 1955 with the barn from the 17th century on the left

Jakob was married to Verena Stüdler, but very little is known of her beyond her name. They had at least one daughter and one son, Baltz.

Jakob’s father and one of his sisters also joined the Anabaptist movement. His brother Ulli, 18 years his junior, was also an Anabaptist and is known for his moderating tone in the attempts at reconciliation between the Amish and Reist sides.

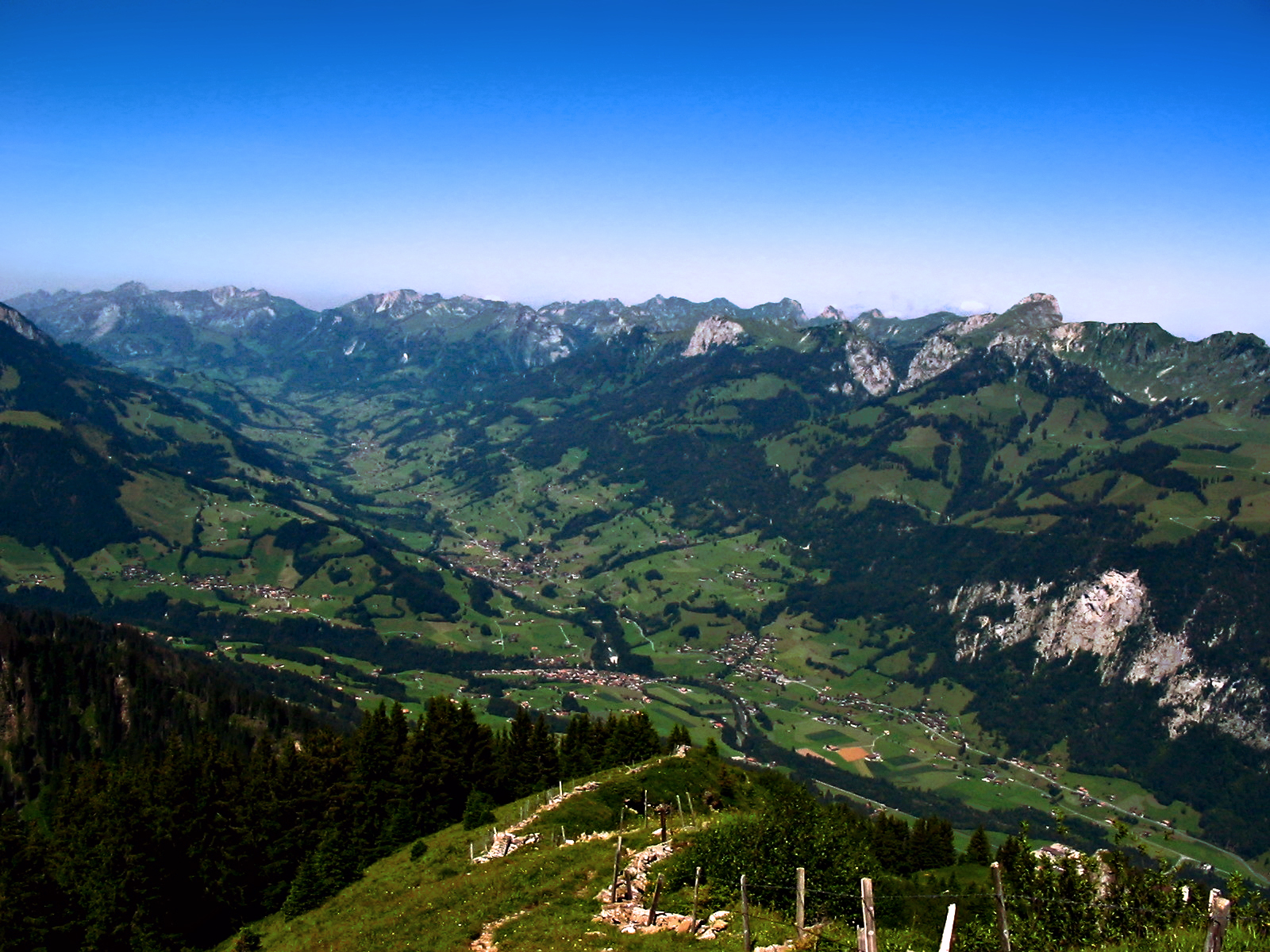
View of Simmental valley, birthplace of Jakob Ammann

=== Conversion to Anabaptism ===
On 12 March 1671, he is noted as the sponsor for a baptism in the state church. In June 1680, government correspondence from Oberhofen asked for counsel from authorities in Bern on how to deal with a Jakob Ammann who had "become infected with the Anabaptist sect". This is the first known reference to Ammann as an Anabaptist. This indicates a conversion to Anabaptism sometime between 1671 and 1680. Sometime between his conversion and 1693, he was ordained to the ministry, possibly by Hans Reist who would later become one of his greatest opponents.

By 1693, Ammann had moved from Switzerland to Heidolsheim, Alsace where his father died and was buried in the neighboring village of Baldenheim. Apparently shortly after the death of his father, he moved to the head of the valley at La Petite Lièpvre (Klein Leberau), near Markirch (today Sainte-Marie-aux-Mines), Alsace, remaining there until October 1712 when all the Anabaptists in the area were expelled by an edict of Louis XIV of France. After this date, no more records concerning Jakob Ammann have been found. He probably went to live with friends or relatives somewhere in Lower Alsace.

=== Death ===
The date and place of Ammann's death are unknown, but in 1730 his daughter requested baptism in the Reformed Church in Erlenbach and stated that her father had died. It is not recorded when or where the death had occurred. Ammann's involvement in church matters had dropped off considerably before his disappearance from the records in 1712, possibly from old age since he would have been approaching 70 years of age when he moved away from the Sainte-Marie-aux-Mines area.

== Theology and practice ==
Because of scarcity of materials, very little is known of Jakob Ammann’s teaching and day-to-day life. Three letters comprise the whole of his first-hand accounts of his thoughts. (Note: This sparsity is probably due to his inability to write. The extant letters were probably dictated.) Other letters accuse Jakob of teaching or holding various viewpoints, but since many of these letters were written by his opponents it is not clear how much bias the accusations contain.

From Jakob’s letters, it can be learned that he was a firm disciplinarian, uncompromising in what he believed, and expected others to "conform to the teachings of Christ and His apostles". His rejection of the "good-hearted" stemmed from his belief that whoever accepted the "true saving faith" would be baptized upon that faith, cost what it may. They would "forsake the world" and practise a very practical separation in their everyday life. Jakob was willing to disregard longstanding customs and practices if they were not founded on God’s Word. He denied that he was trying to start a "new faith". He believed in a new birth experience that would radically change a person. He wrote:

If a miser does not turn from his fornication, and a drunkard from his drunkenness, or other immoralities, they are thereby separated from the kingdom of God, and if he does not improve himself through a pious, penitent life, such a person is no Christian and will not inherit the Kingdom of God.

In practical matters, he stood opposed to long hair on men, shaved beards, and clothing that manifested pride. Liars were to be excommunicated. Ammann, unlike most Amish married men of today, however, had a mustache, which is largely forbidden today in the faith.

== Schism ==
Jakob Ammann is known because of his prominent involvement in a schism among the Swiss Brethren that began in 1693. Until recent decades, he was often heavily blamed for the division, being portrayed as an angry, harsh, and demanding leader who imposed his views on others. (Note: The Amish side of the division did not publish much about the event, while the other side of the story was published, creating a basically one-sided version that was passed down from generation to generation.) With the publication of some of the correspondence from the period (beginning in 1950, with Mast’s "Amish Letters") and the uncovering of new evidence, Ammann’s reputation has received a more positive appraisal among some researchers. Because of their prominent roles, Jakob Ammann and Hans Reist have been used to characterize the two sides of the schism, but the issues were broader than the two most prominent men involved.

=== Background ===
In the mid-1600s, a fresh influx of converts came into Swiss Anabaptism. The Reformed pastor at Burgdorf even complained that half of the people in the villages in his area were either Anabaptist or deeply sympathetic to their cause. These fresh converts—zealous for their new faith—were in fact a sort of new movement within Swiss Anabaptism. Of the nearly 200 surnames among the Amish in the 1690s, only a very few were found in the Reist side, indicating that the two sides formed mostly around two groups of people with different origins. Because of persecution, many Swiss Brethren families had emigrated or been evicted from Swiss territory into the Alsace and Palatinate before the division. The civil authorities tended to be more lenient in the new locations, and in some cases welcomed the newcomers as they were looking for people to develop their lands. This emigration tended to create a different environment than the Swiss who had not emigrated were experiencing, making some of the issues come to the fore.

Another important aspect in the schism was a conference held at Ohnenheim, Alsace, by several Swiss Brethren ministers and elders in 1660, in which they formally adopted the Dordrecht Confession of Faith that had been drawn up by Dutch Mennonites. Until this time, the Swiss Brethren (who did not use the name "Mennonite" for themselves) had no official confession of faith beyond the Schleitheim Confession. (Note: The Schleitheim Confession was not an official confession of faith, but rather a statement of some points upon which those attending that conference had agreed upon.) The Dordrecht Confession contained two points that the Swiss Brethren had not historically practised: foot washing (Article XI) and social avoidance (including not eating meals with those who had been shunned, Article XVII). Swiss Brethren had practised excommunication and a refusal to "eat" the Lord's Supper with those banned, but their avoidance did not include refraining from eating regular meals with those in the bann. These two matters, foot washing and not eating "physical" meals with the excommunicated, would be at the core of the schism.

=== Beginning ===
In 1693, Jakob Ammann, "together with the ministers and elders," sent a general letter to people within the Swiss Brethren congregations, asking for a meeting in which he wanted clarification about where they stood on three questions: 1) Shunning those who had been banned, 2) whether liars should be excommunicated, and 3) if people could be saved who did not follow God’s word. This last issue was referring to the "good-hearted", meaning those who sympathized with the Anabaptists and even helped them materially in times of persecution, but who would not take the step of rebaptism. (Note: So as to escape persecution, since rebaptism was illegal.) Those siding with Ammann felt that these "good-hearted" people should not be looked upon and consoled as "saved" unless they took up the cross and followed Christ in rebaptism and obedience to his teachings.

Along with feetwashing, these three points were at the core of the division. However, other disputations surfaced during the discussions in the following years, including frequency of communion (Note: The Amish side wanted it twice per year so that women who missed because of pregnancy could have more than one opportunity per year. Historically the Swiss Brethren had only practiced communion once per year.) and how church discipline should be conducted. (Note: Historically, the Swiss Brethren had a more congregational approach, where the whole congregation approved of matters like excommunications. The Dutch Mennonites tended to give more authority to ministers.) Another matter mentioned during the time of the schism was the establishment of stricter regulations concerning dress and beard styles. However, social avoidance of banned individuals was the most controversial of all the differences between them, and thus it has sometimes been erroneously considered as the only cause of the schism.

=== Excommunications ===
Jakob Ammann and Nicolas Augsburger were chosen by a ministerial committee to travel to Switzerland for a meeting with church leaders to find out where the Swiss congregations stood on the disputed points.. At first, a few of the Swiss ministers agreed with Ammann’s view, but in a later meeting Hans Reist would not agree with social avoidance, using Matthew 15:17 as a basis for "what enters the mouth is no sin." Another meeting was called, in which Hans Reist did not show up, saying he was busy. At this point, Jakob Ammann became irritated (verdreiszlich) (Note: This word has been translated to English as "enraged" (Roth and Mast), thus giving Jakob the reputation of having lost his calm. Leroy Beachy prefers "annoyed". The exact level of Ammann’s "vexation" is, of course, unknown.) and then proceeded to announce that Hans Reist was excommunicated on six points. When Ammann questioned some of the other Swiss ministers at the meeting where they stood on the issues, they pleaded for time to consult with their congregations. Ammann saw this as a turning back, since some of them had previously expressed agreement with his side. He then proceeded to announce the excommunication of six of the present ministers. Amman and the four men with him then left "without shaking hands with anyone." These excommunications created a definite breach within the Swiss Brethren movement. The Reist side eventually excommunicated the Ammann side as well.

=== Attempts at reconciliation ===
Within a few years, several attempts were made at reconciliation. In February 1700, Jakob Ammann and several of his co-ministers removed the ban from the Swiss ministers and excommunicated themselves in recognition that they had acted too rashly and had "grievously erred". They did not feel that they were in error, but rather that they had not given sufficient time for the Reist side to consider the matter before excommunicating them. Also, they felt that they should not have excommunicated the Swiss ministers on the spot, but should have consulted with the whole congregation before proceeding. However, while Hans Reist and some of the Swiss ministers appear to have accepted the repentance of Ammann and his co-workers, they held firm to their position of not accepting social shunning. Some of the other issues had been accepted by the Swiss ministers, but the main body of Amish and the Reist side were never able to reach agreement about social shunning.

Today in North America, the Amish and Mennonites work side-by-side on business and charitable aid projects. However, official sharing of ministry and communion is rare among the most conservative groups of Old Order Amish and Mennonites. In more moderate groups, there remains little to no effect from the schism, with the exception of names of churches.The Reist side became known as Mennonites after the schism.

But in a paradox, it was the Amish side that was pushing for the introduction of Dutch Mennonite ideas, and those opposing the ideas eventually became known as Mennonites.

Today, in many communities they live side by side, and work together in publishing.
