= Adam Pastor =

Adam Pastor (d. 1560s) was born Roelof Martens or Martin, at Dörpen, Westphalia, and was a Catholic priest at Aschendorf until 1533, when he joined the peaceful wing of the Anabaptists. At the Anabaptist conference in Goch in 1547, at which Menno Simons was chairman, Pastor was censured for his anti-Trinitarian views, and then in Lübeck in 1552 he and Simons held a debate on the deity of Christ and the Trinity.

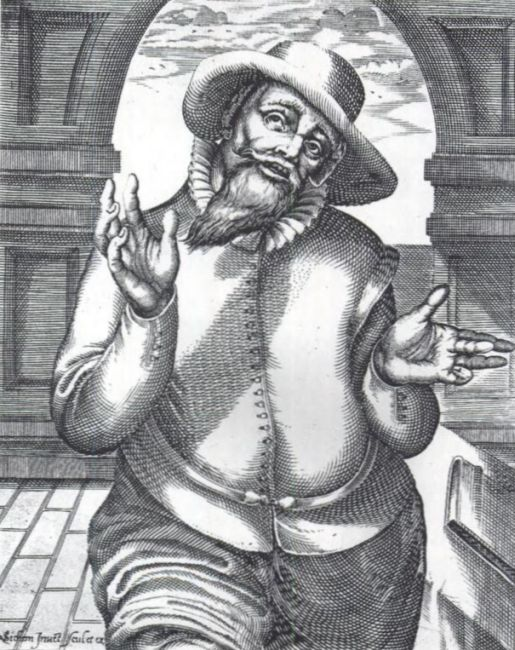
Adam Pastor

== Works ==
- Disputation on the Trinity 1552
