= Alain Reist =

Swiss ice hockey player

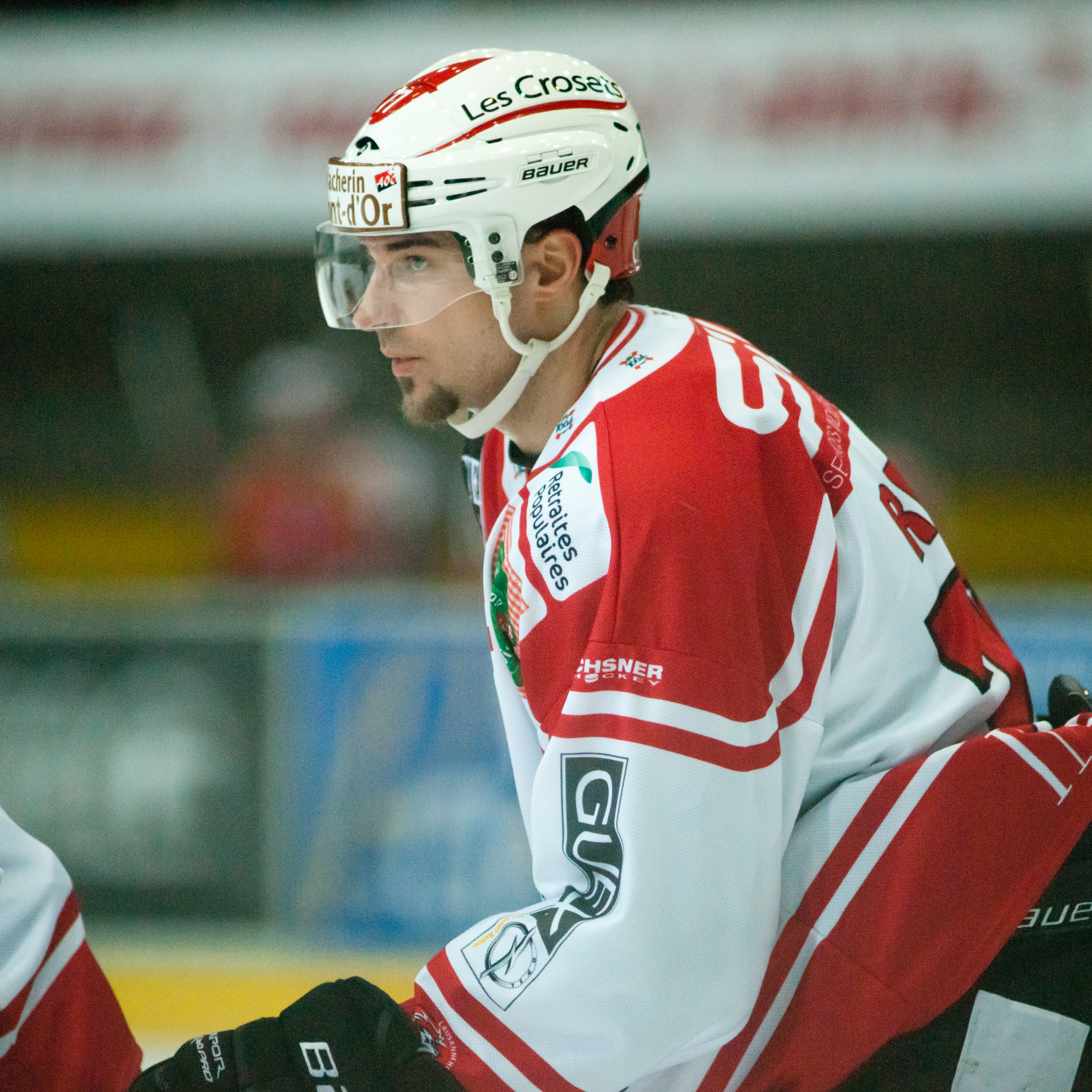
- Born: December 7, 1979 (age 45); Biel, Switzerland
- Height: 6 ft 0 in (183 cm)
- Weight: 209 lb (95 kg; 14 st 13 lb)
- Position: Defence
- Shot: Left
- Played for: SC Rapperswil-Jona; Kloten Flyers; Lausanne HC; HC Fribourg-Gottéron; ZSC Lions
- Playing career: 1997–2014

Alain Reist (born December 7, 1979) is a Swiss former professional ice hockey defenceman who played 11 seasons in the National League A (NLA).

Reist made his NLA debut playing with SC Rapperswil-Jona during the 1999–2000 season.

== Career statistics ==
			Regular season					Playoffs
Season	Team	League	GP	G	A	Pts	PIM	GP	G	A	Pts	PIM
1996–97	EHC Biel	NLB	14	0	1	1	2	5	1	0	1	6
1997–98	EHC Biel	NLB	34	2	4	6	26	12	0	1	1	0
1998–99	Bern U20	U20-Elite	6	1	1	2	4	5	0	2	2	0
1998–99	EHC Biel	NLB	23	0	2	2	17	8	0	0	0	0
1999–00	SC Rapperswil-Jona	NLA	45	0	1	1	20	—	—	—	—	—
2000–01	SC Rapperswil-Jona	NLA	44	1	17	18	28	4	0	1	1	8
2001–02	SC Rapperswil-Jona	NLA	44	5	5	10	47	—	—	—	—	—
2002–03	Kloten Flyers	NLA	44	2	5	7	49	5	0	0	0	0
2003–04	Kloten Flyers	NLA	48	2	7	9	32	—	—	—	—	—
2004–05	Lausanne HC	NLA	43	1	10	11	51	—	—	—	—	—
2005–06	Lausanne HC	NLB	42	8	10	18	53	12	1	3	4	18
2006–07	HC Fribourg-Gottéron	NLA	43	1	1	2	71	—	—	—	—	—
2007–08	HC Fribourg-Gottéron	NLA	50	0	4	4	34	11	0	1	1	6
2008–09	HC Fribourg-Gottéron	NLA	48	3	6	9	30	11	0	0	0	6
2009–10	ZSC Lions	NLA	38	3	3	6	22	7	0	0	0	22
2010–11	Lausanne HC	NLB	44	3	7	10	50	17	0	2	2	4
2011–12	Lausanne HC	NLB	43	2	8	10	53	14	0	1	1	28
2012–13	Lausanne HC	NLB	43	1	9	10	16	15	0	1	1	31
2013–14	Lausanne HC	NLA	34	0	0	0	31	—	—	—	—	—
NLA totals			481	18	59	77	415	66	0	7	7	62
