= George Blaurock =

Anabaptist leader and evangelist (c. 1491 – 1529)

Jörg vom Haus Jacob ("George of the House of Jacob"; also Georg Cajacob), commonly known as George Blaurock (c. 1491 – September 6, 1529), was an Anabaptist leader and evangelist. Along with Conrad Grebel and Felix Manz, he was a co-founder of the Swiss Brethren in Zürich, and thereby one of the founders of Anabaptism.

== Biography ==
George Blaurock was born in 1491 in Bonaduz in Graubünden, in the Swiss Confederacy. He was educated at the University of Leipzig and served as a priest of the Roman Catholic Church until his conversion to evangelical Anabaptism. Blaurock had evidently departed from the Catholic Church before he arrived in Zürich circa 1524, for he had already taken a wife. Though he came to see Huldrych Zwingli, he soon became attached to the more radical followers of Zwingli. These radicals insisted on following only that which had Biblical support. They rejected the mass, images, and infant baptism. The city council condemned their position, ordered them to desist from their meetings, and ordered all unbaptized babies to be baptized within eight days. On January 21, 1525, the despondent group held a secret meeting at the home of Felix Manz. These believers went to their knees in prayer for guidance. Arising from the prayer, George Blaurock asked Conrad Grebel to baptize him upon a confession of faith in Christ. Grebel did so, and afterward Blaurock proceeded to baptize the others who were present.

George Blaurock worked closely with Felix Manz until Manz was martyred in Zürich on January 5, 1527. On that same day, Blaurock was severely beaten and permanently expelled from Zürich. He kept moving, laboring at Bern, Biel, the Grisons, and Appenzell. After his arrest and fourth banishment in April 1527, Blaurock left Switzerland never to return.

He then turned to the County of Tyrol. In 1529 he became the pastor of the church in Adige Valley, after their former pastor, Michael Kürschner, was burned at the stake. Blaurock conducted a very successful ministry in Tyrol. Many believers were baptized and churches founded. The example of discipleship in full communities of goods that began among the churches that Blaurock started continues to be a source of inspiration to intentional communities such as the Hutterites and the Bruderhof. In August he and Hans Langegger were arrested by Innsbruck authorities. While in captivity they were tortured for information. On September 6, 1529, Blaurock and Langegger were burned at the stake near Klausen.

The only writings left by Blaurock were a letter and two hymns written during his last three weeks of life. The hymns are entitled Gott Führt Ein Recht Gericht ("God Holds a Righteous Judgment") and Gott, dich will ich loben ("God, You I Will Praise"). Both hymns are preserved in the Ausbund, an old Anabaptist hymnal still used by the Amish.

Gott, dich will ich loben
1. Lord God, how do I praise Thee
From hence and evermore,
That Thou real faith didst give me
By which I Thee may know.
6. Forget me not, O Father,
Be near me evermore;
Thy Spirit shield and teach me,
That in afflictions great
Thy comfort I may ever prove,
And valiantly may obtain
The victory in this fight.
