= Balthasar Hubmaier =

German Anabaptist leader

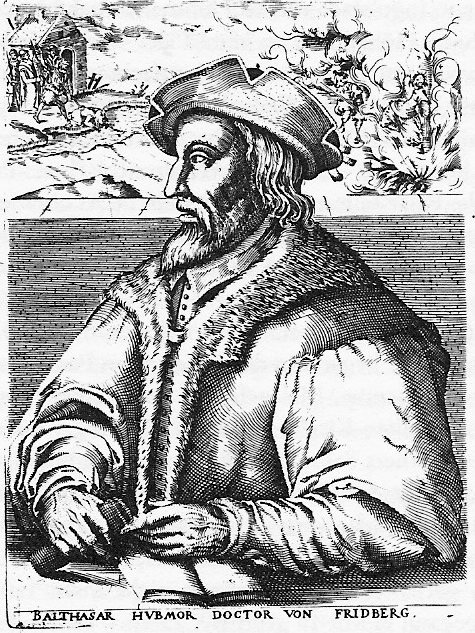
- Balthasar Hubmaier on his only known portrait
- Born: 1480; Friedberg, Duchy of Bavaria
- Died: 10 March 1528 (aged 47–48); Vienna, Archduchy of Austria
- Occupation: Theologian
- Theological work
- Era: Protestant Reformation
- Tradition or movement: Anabaptism

Balthasar Hubmaier (Note: Also Hubmair, Hubmayr, Hubmeier, Huebmör, Hubmör, Friedberger; Latin: Pacimontanus) (1480 – 10 March 1528) was an influential German Anabaptist leader. He was one of the most well-known and respected Anabaptist theologians of the Reformation.

== Early life and education ==
He was born in Friedberg, Bavaria, in 1480. Information on his parentage is lacking.

He attended Latin School at Augsburg, and entered the University of Freiburg on 1 May 1503. Insufficient funds caused him to leave the university and teach for a time at Schaffhausen, Switzerland. He returned to Freiburg in 1507 and received both a bachelor's and a master's degree in 1511. In 1512, he received a doctor's degree from the University of Ingolstadt under Johann Eck, and became the university's vice-rector by 1515. Hubmaier's fame as a pulpiteer was widespread. He left the University of Ingolstadt for a pastorate of the Roman Catholic church at Regensburg in 1516.

After Maximilian I's death in 1519, Hubmaier helped orchestrate a violent pogrom against Regensburg's Jews, as well as the total destruction of their synagogue; after the Jews' murder and expulsion, he was instrumental in orchestrating — near the site of the erstwhile synagogue — an image cult of the Beautiful Maria of Regensburg, which drew pilgrims from all over Europe and was much criticized by Reformers. In his later life (1527), he expressed a change of view about the Jews, as he wrote: “Yes, in fact I should show friendship toward Jews[…], so that they might be drawn by a Christian example to Christian faith.” In 1521, Hubmaier went to Waldshut-Tiengen. In 1524, he married Elizabeth Hügline from Reichenau, Baden-Württemberg.

== Reformer and Anabaptist ==
In 1522 he became acquainted with Heinrich Glarean (Conrad Grebel's teacher) and Erasmus at Basel. In March 1523, in Zürich, Hübmaier met with Huldrych Zwingli and even participated in a disputation there in October of that same year. In the disputation, he set forth the principle of obedience to the Scriptures, writing, "In all disputes concerning faith and religion, the scriptures alone, proceeding from the mouth of God, ought to be our level and rule." It was evidently here that Hübmaier committed to abandoning infant baptism, a practice he could not support with Scripture. He held that even where the Scriptures appear to contain contradictions, both truths are to be held simultaneously.

Anabaptist Wilhelm Reublin arrived in Waldshut in 1525, having been driven out of Zürich. In April Reublin baptized Hubmaier and sixty others. In Waldshut, Hubmaier's increasingly Anabaptist views gained him the disfavor of Prince Ferdinand. It was that rivalry that would eventually lead to Hubmaier's martyrdom. Hubmaier initially went to Schaffhausen in order to find protection against the Prince.

In December 1525, Hubmaier again fled to Zürich to escape the Austrian army. Hoping to find refuge, Zwingli instead had him arrested. While a prisoner, Hubmaier requested a disputation on baptism, which was granted. The disputation yielded some unusual events. Ten men, four of whom Hubmaier requested, were present for the disputation. Within the discussion, Hubmaier proceeded to quote statements by Zwingli in which he asserted that children should not be baptized until they had been instructed. Zwingli responded that he had been misunderstood. Hubmaier's criticism went further by placing Zwingli's reversal on the issue against Zwingli's reform against the Catholics. Hubmaier wrote, "If you do not [demonstrate infant baptism from Scripture], the vicar will complain that you have used against him a sword that you now lay aside."

Despite Hubmaier's arguments, the council sided with the native Zwingli and ruled in Zwingli's favor. The bewildered Hübmaier agreed to recant. But before the congregation the next day, he attested the mental and spiritual anguish brought on by his actions and stated, "I cannot and I will not recant." Back in prison and under the torture of the rack, he did offer the required recantation. He was then allowed to leave Switzerland and journeyed to Nikolsburg in Moravia. This weakness troubled him deeply and brought forth his Short Apology in 1526, which includes the statement: "I may err—I am a man—but a heretic I cannot be… O God, pardon me my weakness".

== Prison and death ==
In Nikolsburg, Hubmaier's preaching soon made converts to Anabaptism out of the group of Zwinglians who lived in the area. Political fortunes turned, however, and Ferdinand, to whom Hubmaier had already become an enemy while in Waldshut, gained control of Bohemia, thus placing Hubmaier once again in Ferdinand's jurisdiction. Hubmaier and his wife were seized by the Austrian authorities and taken to Vienna. He was held in the castle Gratzenstein (now called "Burg Kreuzenstein" in German), until March 1528.

"I may err – I am a man," he wrote, "but a heretic I cannot be, because I ask constantly for instruction in the word of God." He suffered torture on the rack, and was tried for heresy and convicted. On 10 March 1528, he was taken to the public square and executed by burning. His wife exhorted him to remain steadfast. Three days after his execution, his wife, with a stone tied around her neck, was drowned in the River Danube.

== Views ==
=== On the Trinity ===
Hubmaier was more conservative than some Anabaptists, such as Hans Denck and Leonhard Schiemer, who went on to deny the doctrine of the Trinity, or avoided emphasis of the doctrine similar to Menno Simons.

=== On government and the sword ===
As a Schwertler (of-the-sword) Anabaptist, Hubmaier believed government to be an institution ordained by God. According to the view presented in his writings, Christians have a responsibility to support the secular government and pay taxes. While Hubmaier may be considered a moderate pacifist, he clearly stated his beliefs regarding the government's responsibility to defend the righteous, the innocent, and the helpless, in his work, On the Sword. Moreover, he believed that Christians should take up the sword if ordered to do so by the ruling government for a just cause. The Christian's use of the sword is the primary distinction between Schwertler Anabaptism and the total pacifism of Stäbler (staff/cane-bearing) Anabaptism.

=== On baptism ===
Much of Hubmaier's work centered on the issue of baptism because of the polemical nature of the issue in distinguishing the emerging Anabaptist movement from Zwinglian or other magisterial reform movements. Hubmaier rejected the notion of infant baptism as unscriptural and was a proponent of believer's baptism, i.e. that baptism is an ordinance for those who respond to the gospel. The importance of this point in Hubmaier's theology is demonstrated by the fact that the first half of his catechism is reserved for clarification of the issue. He further rejected the Catholic doctrine of baptism insofar as it was ex opere operato and viewed the rite as a symbol of entrance into and accountability to the community of faith.

=== On the mother of Jesus ===
Despite his break from the Catholic Church, Hubmaier never abandoned his belief in the perpetual virginity of Mary and continued to esteem Mary as theotokos ("mother of God"). These two doctrinal stances are addressed in Articles Nine and Ten, respectively, of Hubmaier's work, Apologia. "Of course Mary was the mother of the LORD JESUS, who was God in the flesh—"GOD WITH US EMANUEL". Hubmaier rejected the teaching that Mary was co-Redeemer and without sin. He believed that Jesus Christ was the only sinless being without an earthly Father.

=== On women ===
Hubmaier's writings dealt a little with the subject of women. He compared God's discipline of his children with a teacher whipping a student, or a man beating his wife. It is unknown if Hubmaier agreed with the practice of beating one's students or one's wife, for he did not elaborate in his work. As with any figure from earlier times, however, we cannot judge precisely Hubmaier's view on women based on such a reference.

=== On restoration ===
Hubmaier believed that restored men and women had a free spirit, which was not affected by the Fall of Adam.

=== On the Church Fathers ===
Hubmaier made reference to the Church Fathers frequently in his works, often to show the historical nature of his arguments. Hubmaier was familiar with the works of at least a dozen Church Fathers, including Origen, Tertullian, Basil of Caesarea, Ambrose, John Chrysostom, Cyprian, and Augustine of Hippo.

According to historian and theologian Andrew Klager, "Hubmaier not only cognitively accepted the teachings of the fathers on baptism and free will, but embraced them as co-affiliates with himself in the one, holy, apostolic ecclesia universalis in protest against the errant papal ecclesia particularis as per the composition of his ecclesiology." In terms of how Hubmaier accessed the writings of the Church Fathers, he "was inspired by humanist principles, especially ad fontes, restitutionism, and rejection of scholastic syllogism and glosses in favour of full, humanist editions of the fathers based on an improved focus on grammar and philology." Although Hubmaier references the Church Fathers in many of his works, his two treatises called Old and New Teachers on Believers Baptism (1526) provide his most systematic and deliberate exploration of the thought of the Fathers on baptism specifically.

=== On the two wills of God ===
Hubmaier proposed an idea of God having two Wills; one was called the "absolute" will and could never be changed, also called God's "hidden" will, and another which could be accepted or rejected by people was called the "ordained" will, also titled God's "revealed" will. The absolute will of God was paired with Predestination (according to foreknowledge, in Hubmaier's view) and to his decisions on certain permissions and decrees for God alone to decide; this is also linked with keeping some sinners alive for more time than others, or dealing with sin and sinners in different ways. While the ordained will, was connected to verses in the Bible which Hubmaier asserted that clearly taught Free will.

== Works ==
- Eighteen Articles (1524)
- Heretics and Those Who Burn Them (1524)
- The Open Appeal of Balthasar of Friedberg to all Christian Believers (1525)
- The Christian Baptism of Believers (1525)
- Old and New Teachers on Believers Baptism (1526)
- Twelve Articles of Christian Belief (1526)
- On the Sword (1527)
- On Fraternal Admonition (1527).

All of his publications contained the motto Die warheit ist untödlich (usually translated as, "Truth is Immortal").

== See also ==
- Apostles' Creed § Articles 9–10

== Bibliography ==
- Bergsten, Torsten (1961), Balthasar Hubmaier: Seine Stellung zu Reformation und Täufertum, 1521–1528 (in German), Kassel: J. G. Oncken Verlag.
- ——— (1978), Barnes, Irwin; Estep, William (eds.), Balthasar Hubmaier: Anabaptist Theologian and Martyr, Valley Forge: Judson Press.
- Brewer, Brian C. "Hubmaier, Balthasar," in Encyclopedia of Martin Luther and the Reformation, Mark A. Lamport, ed. Lanham, MD: Rowman and Littlefield, 2017 (pp. 348-49)
- ——— (January 2010), "Radicalizing Luther: How Balthasar Hubmaier (Mis)Read the 'Father of the Reformation'", Mennonite Quarterly Review, vol. 84, no. 1, pp. 33–53.
- ——— (2012), A Pledge of Love: The Anabaptist Sacramental Theology of Balthasar Hubmaier, Milton Keynes: Paternoster.
- Chatfield, Graeme R. Balthasar Hubmaier and the Clarity of Scripture. Eugene: Pickwick Publications, 2013.
- Klager, Andrew P. "Balthasar Hubmaier’s Use of the Church Fathers: Availability, Access and Interaction." Mennonite Quarterly Review 84 (January 2010): 5–65.
- Estep, William (1996), The Anabaptist Story: An Introduction to Sixteenth-Century Anabaptism, Cambridge, UK: Wm. B Eerdmans, ISBN 978-0-8028-0886-8, OCLC 000000
- Mabry, Eddie Louis (1994), Balthasar Hubmaier's Doctrine of the Church, Lanham, MD: University Press of America.
- ——— (1998), Balthasar Hubmaier's understanding of faith.
- MacGregor, Kirk R. A Central European Synthesis of Radical and Magisterial Reform: The Sacramental Theology of Balthasar Hubmaier. Lanham, MD: University Press of America, 2006.
- MacGregor, Kirk R. "Hubmaier’s Concord of Predestination with Free Will.” Direction: A Mennonite Brethren Forum 35, no. 2 (2006): 279–99.
- Pipkin, H. Wayne & John H. Yoder. Balthasar Hubmaier: Theologian of Anabaptism. Scottdale, PA: Herald Press, 1989.
- Pipkin, H. Wayne. Scholar, Pastor, Martyr: The Life and Ministry of Balthasar Hubmaier (ca. 1480–1528). The Hughey Lectures 2006, Prague: International Baptist Theological Seminary, 2008.
- Potter, G. R. "Anabaptist Extraordinary: Balthasar Hubmaier, 1480–1528.” History Today 26, no. 6 (June 1976): 377–84.
- Vedder, Henry Clay (2009) [1905], Balthasar Hubmaier: The Leader of the Anabaptists, LaVergne, TN: Kessinger.
- Windhors, Cristof. Tatiferisches Taufverstandnis: Balthasar Hubmaiers Lehre zwischen Traditioneller und Reformatorischer Theologie. Leiden: E. J. Brill, 1976.
