= Hans Denck =

German theologian and Anabaptist leader

Hans Denck (c. 1495 – November 27, 1527) was a German theologian and Anabaptist leader during the Reformation.

== Biography ==
Denck was born in 1495 in the Bavarian town of Habach. He entered the University of Ingolstadt on October 10, 1517, and graduated in 1519. Denck began working as a family tutor in Niederstotzingen. By the recommendation of Johannes Oecolampadius, Denck became headmaster at the St. Sebaldus school in Nuremberg in 1523. He became involved in the trial of the artist brothers Sebald and Barthel Beham, who were expelled from the city in 1524 at the instigation of Andreas Osiander. In Nuremberg, he met Thomas Müntzer and so first came in contact with radical theology, which he accepted with modifications. In consequence of his convictions, he was banished from Nuremberg in January 1524 and forced upon a wandering life, which he henceforth led until his death.

In 1525 he went to Augsburg where he met in April 1526 Balthasar Hubmaier who impressed him very much and who most probably baptized him. In late 1526 he fled from there and arrived in Strasbourg in November 1526 where he stayed with Ludwig Haetzer, a like-minded Anabaptist. He was also expelled from there, and after a long time of wandering in Southern Germany and Switzerland he found refuge with Johannes Oekolampad in Basel. After attending the Martyrs' Synod in Augsburg, he returned to Basel where he died in 1527 of bubonic plague. In his writings he fiercely attacked the reformers; together with Haetzer he translated the Biblical books of the Prophets into German (Worms 1527).

== Theology ==
Denck was influenced by the German theologian Johannes Tauler's mysticism. For Denck the living, inner word of God was more important than the letters of the Scripture. This belief was contrary to the Lutheran belief of giving scripture primacy. Denck thought of the Bible as a human product, the individual books being different witnesses of one truth. He did not value the scripture as the source of all true religious knowledge, but instead the spirit that speaks from within each person. For Denck the sacraments were only symbols: baptism a sign of commitment, communion a ceremony of remembrance.

Denck held that Christ is the embodiment the perfect person, never separated from God because he has always done God's will. Thus does Christ serve as model. Luther taught the doctrine of justification by faith whereas Denck's whole emphasis was put instead on discipleship to Jesus. Indeed, his motto was: "No one may truly know Christ except one who follows him in life".

It is not clear if Denck was Anti-Trinitarian. His enemies as well as modern Unitarian scholars have presented him as Anti-Trinitarian, despite the lack of evidence of this in Denck's own writings. Clearly though, he was a non-dogmatic Christian.

Joachim Vadian and Johann Kessler accused Denck of Universalism, but according to Ludlow, he merely hoped for the salvation of all, and his accusers were mistaken or trying to discredit him. However, Ludlow was unaware of a lesser-known account by sympathetic pastor Sigelsbach of a conversation where Denck said it was "evident that the blasphemy of the damned will stop in the end". Moreover, Urbanus Rhegius wrote how Denck confessed to him, after over a year of denying, "that he believed that no man or devil was eternally damned".

Denck's universalism sprang from his convictions that God is always merciful because He is love, loves His enemies as He teaches us to love ours, uses only corrective albeit sometimes painful and long-lasting ("eternal") punishment, and draws everyone back to unity in Him. Origen's influence probably played a role. Unlike Origen, though, it seems that Denck avoided writing about universalism for fear of the authorities and preached it instead. After Denck's death, universalism was reportedly confessed by an Anabaptist imprisoned for heresy in 1528, and Denck's student Clement Ziegler published two treatises defending it in 1532, though he would keep quiet about it the last 20 years of his life.

== Selected works ==
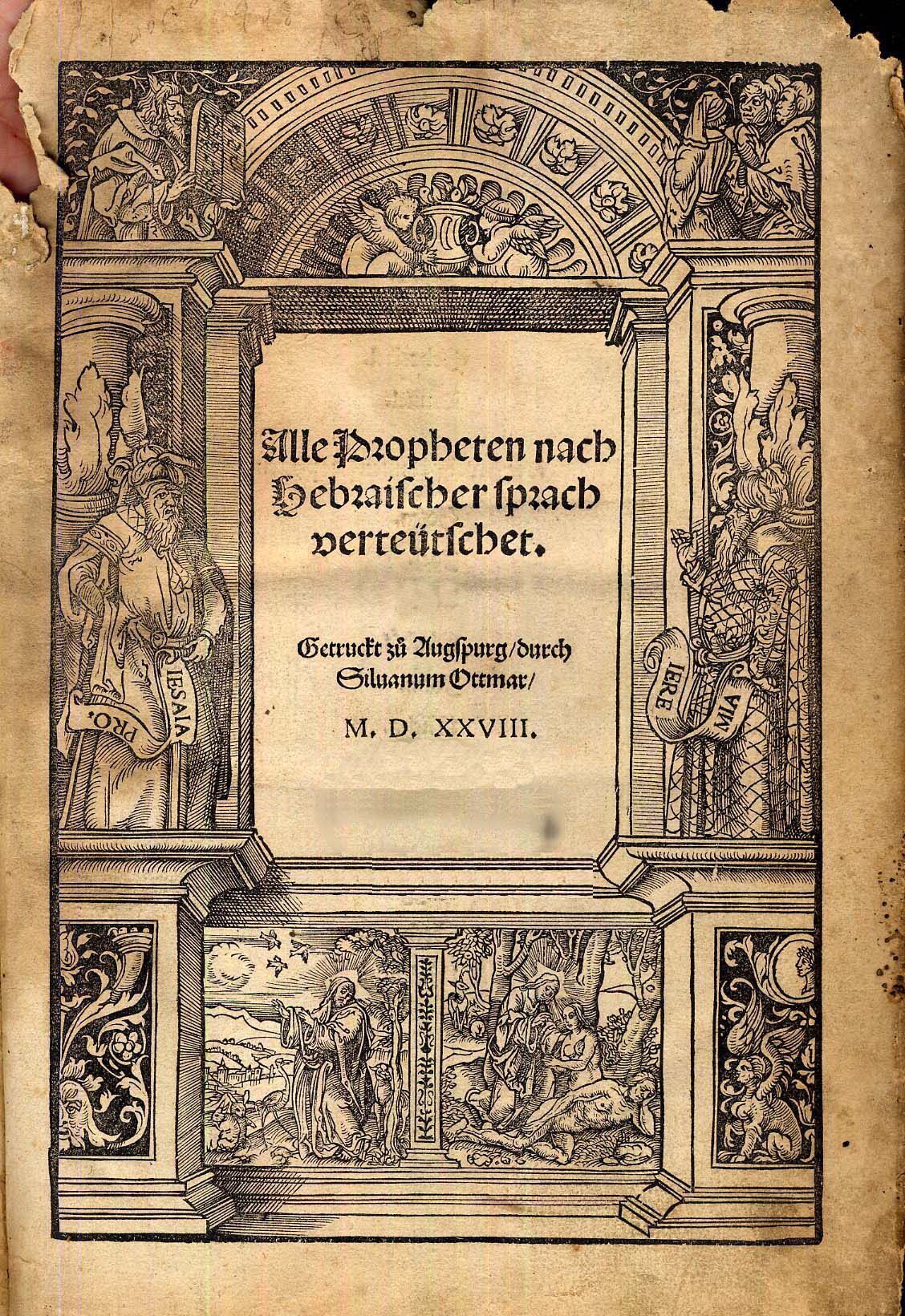
Alle Propheten, 1528 edition title page.

- Von der wahren Liebe. Reprint of the edition Worms 1527. Nördlingen: Uhl 1983.
- Alle Prophetenn Nach Hebräischer Sprache verdeutscht. Translation: Ludwig Hätzer u. Hans Dengk. Augspurg 1530.
  - Microfiche-edition: The radical Reformation microfiche project [Mikroform]. Section 1, Mennonite and related sources up to 1600. Zug: InterDocumentation Comp., 19XX.
- Micha der Prophet auss rechter Hebraischen sprach verteutsch und wie den H. D. auf diese letste Zeit verglichen hat. Strassburg, c. 1535.
