= Felix Manz =

Co-founder of the Swiss Brethren movement (1498–1527)

- Born: Felix Mantz; 1498; Zürich, Old Swiss Confederacy
- Died: 1527 (aged 28–29); Zürich, Old Swiss Confederacy
- Known for: Co-founder of the original Swiss Brethren congregation

Felix Manz (also Mantz; c. 1498 – 5 January 1527) was an Anabaptist, a co-founder of the original Swiss Brethren congregation in Zürich, Switzerland, and an early martyr of the Radical Reformation.

== Birth and life ==
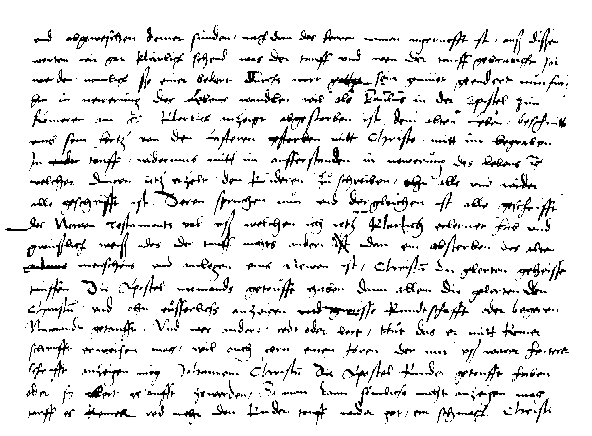
"Protestation und Schutzschrift" by Felix Manz

Manz was born and died in Zürich, in the Old Swiss Confederacy, where his father was a canon of Grossmünster church. Though records of his education are scant, there is evidence that he had a liberal education, with a thorough knowledge of Hebrew, Greek and Latin. Manz became a follower of Huldrych Zwingli after he came to Zürich in 1519. When Conrad Grebel joined the group in 1521, he and Manz became friends. They questioned the mass, the nature of church and state connections, and infant baptism. After the Second Disputation of Zürich in 1523, they became dissatisfied, believing that Zwingli's plans for reform had been compromised with the city council.

Grebel, Manz and others made several attempts to plead their position. Several parents refused to have their children baptized. A public disputation was held with Zwingli on 17 January 1525. The council declared Zwingli the victor.

After the final rebuff by the city council on 18 January, in which they were ordered to desist from arguing and submit to the decision of the council, and have their children baptized within eight days, the brethren gathered at the home of Felix Manz and his mother on 21 January. Conrad Grebel baptized George Blaurock, and Blaurock in turn baptized the others. This made complete the break with Zwingli and the council, and formed the first church of the Radical Reformation. The movement spread rapidly, and Manz was very active in it. He used his language skills to translate his texts into the language of the people and worked enthusiastically as an evangelist. Manz was arrested on a number of occasions between 1525 and 1527. While he was preaching with George Blaurock in the Grüningen region, they were taken by surprise, arrested and imprisoned in Zürich at the Wellenburg prison.

== Execution ==
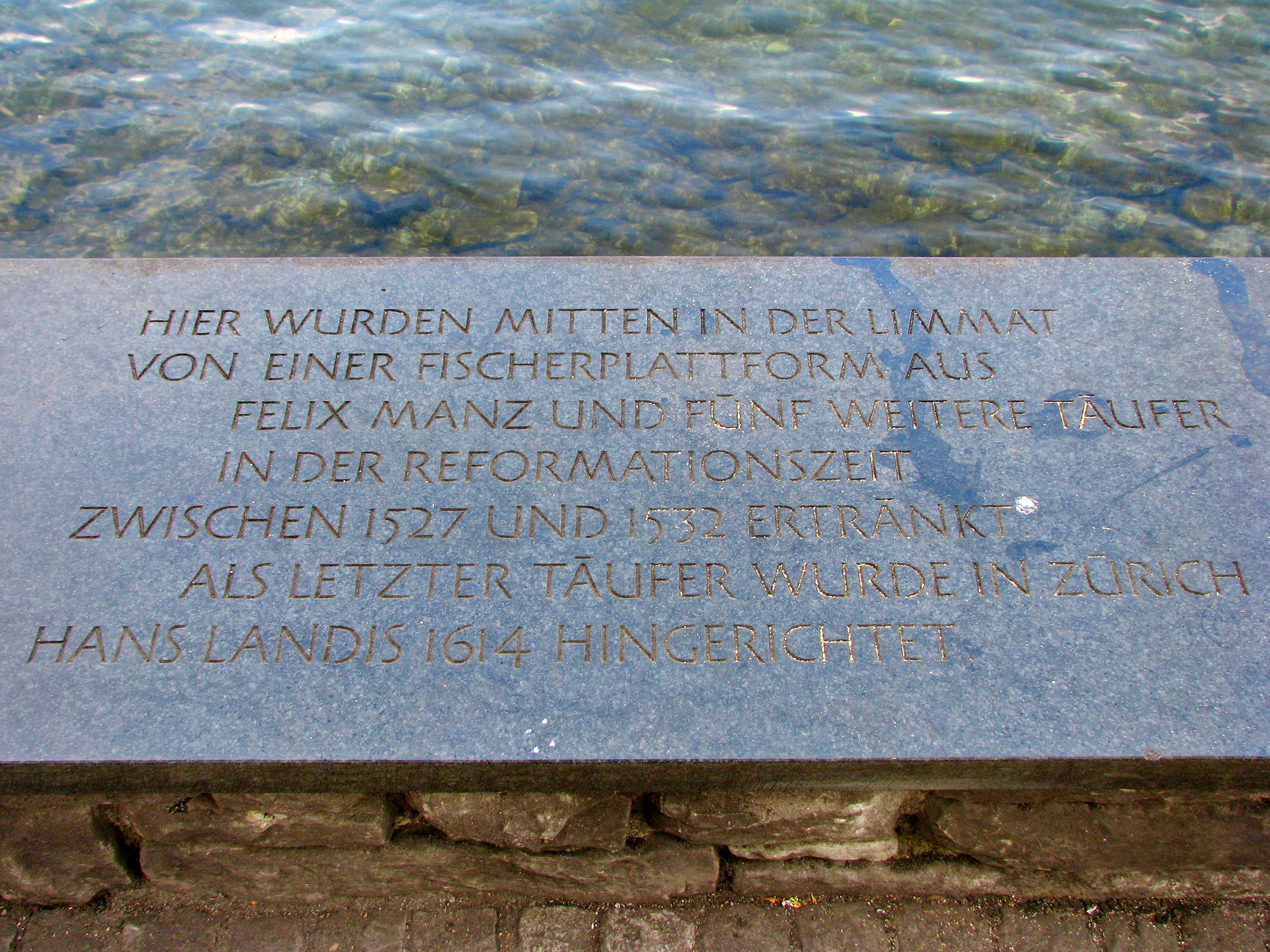
Memorial plate on the river wall opposite number 43 Schipfe in Zürich, in remembrance of Manz and other Anabaptists executed in the early 16th century by the Zürich city government.

On 7 March 1526, the Zürich council had passed an edict that made adult re-baptism punishable by drowning. On 5 January 1527, Felix Manz became the first casualty of the edict, and the first Swiss Anabaptist to be martyred at the hands of magisterial Protestants. While Manz stated that he wished "to bring together those who were willing to accept Christ, obey the Word, and follow in His footsteps, to unite with these by baptism, and to purchase the rest in their present conviction", Zwingli and the council accused him of obstinately refusing "to recede from his error and caprice". At 3:00 p.m., as he was led from the Wellenburg to a boat, he praised God and preached to the people. A Reformed minister went along, seeking to silence him, and hoping to give him an opportunity to recant. Manz's brother and mother encouraged him to stand firm and suffer for Jesus' sake. He was taken by boat onto the River Limmat. His hands were bound and pulled behind his knees, and a pole was placed between them. He was executed by drowning in Lake Zürich on the Limmat. His alleged last words were, "Into thy hands, O God, I commend my spirit." His property was confiscated by the government of Zürich, and he was buried in the St. Jakobs cemetery. Manz's execution predates the Münster Rebellion, which officially began in 1534.

Manz left written testimony of his faith, an eighteen-stanza hymn, and was apparently the author of Protestation und Schutzschrift (a defense of Anabaptism presented to the Zürich council).

== Legacy ==
The witness of Felix Manz' life and the other radical Anabaptists continues to be a source of inspiration to Christians today. The Amish, Baptist, Mennonite and Bruderhof churches all are influenced to varying degrees by Manz and the other Reformation-era Anabaptists.

== Hymn ==
An 18-stanza hymn by Manz has been preserved and is found in the Ausbund, a 16th-century hymn book still used by the Amish. It is a hymn of praise to God for his great salvation. The seven lines of the first stanza are found below.

Deutsch	English
1. Mit Lust so will ich singen 2. Mein Herz freut sich in Gott; 3. Der mir viel Kunst thut bringen, 4. Dasz ich entrinn dem Tod; 5. Der ewiglich nimmet kein End.; 6. Ich preiz dich Christ vom Himmel, 7. Der mir mein Kummer wend.	1. With gladness will I now sing; 2. My heart delights in God, 3. Who showed me such forbearance 4. That I from death was saved 5. Which never hath an end.; 6. I praise Thee, Christ in heaven 7. Who all my sorrow changed.

== Sources ==
- A History of the Baptists, by Thomas Armitage ISBN 1-57978-353-8
- Leben und Sterben des Zürcher Täuferführers, Felix Mantz, by Ekkehard Trajewski (Estep and others call this the "definitive work" on Felix Manz.)
- "Anabaptists", in The Mennonite Encyclopedia, Harold S. Bender, Cornelius J. Dyck, Dennis D. Martin, Henry C. Smith, et al., editors, (Brethren Publishing House, 1955) ISBN 0-8361-1018-8
- The Anabaptist Story, by William R. Estep ISBN 0-8028-1594-4
- The Anabaptist Vision, by Harold S. Bender ISBN 0-8361-1305-5
- The Bloody Theater or Martyrs Mirror, by Thieleman J. van Braght ISBN 0-8361-1390-X
- The Reformers and their Stepchildren, by Leonard Verduin ISBN 1-57978-934-X
