= Sacrament =

Type of Christian rite

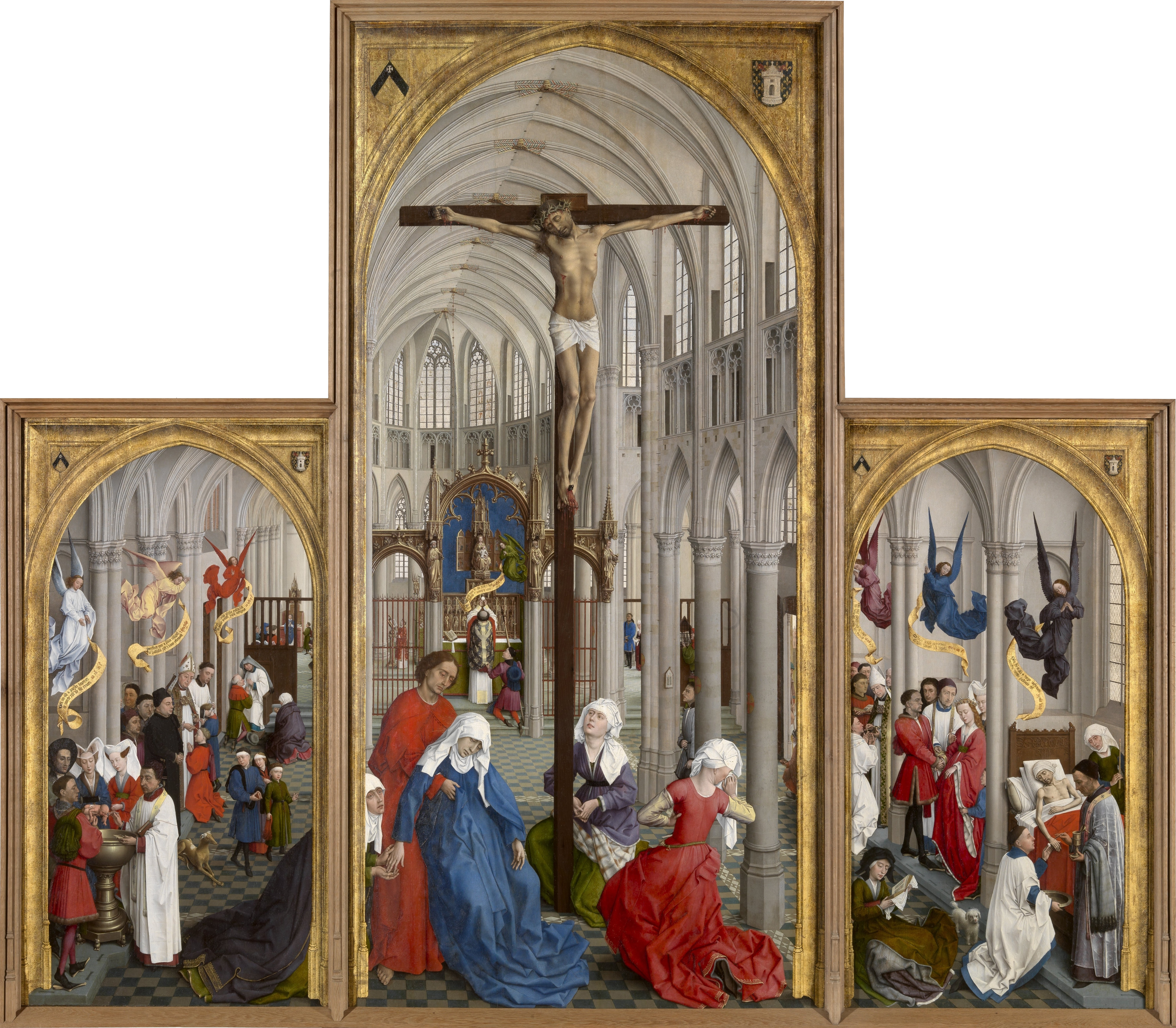
The Seven Sacraments, an altarpiece by Rogier van der Weyden

A sacrament is a Christian rite which is recognized as being particularly important and significant. There are various views on the existence, number and meaning of such rites. Many Christians consider the sacraments to be a visible symbol of the reality of God, as well as a channel for God's grace. Many denominations, including the Catholic, Lutheran, Moravian, Reformed (Continental Reformed, Presbyterian, and Congregationalist traditions), Anglican, Methodist and Baptist, hold to the definition of sacrament formulated by Augustine of Hippo: an outward sign of an inward grace, that has been instituted by Jesus Christ. Sacraments signify God's grace in a way that is outwardly observable to the participant.

The Catholic Church, Hussite Church and the Old Catholic Church recognize seven sacraments: Baptism, Penance (Reconciliation or Confession), Eucharist (or Holy Communion), Confirmation, Marriage (Matrimony), Holy Orders, and Anointing of the Sick (Extreme Unction). The Eastern Churches, such as the Eastern Orthodox Church and Oriental Orthodox Church as well as the Eastern Catholic Churches, recognize these as the seven major sacraments, but also apply the words sacred mysteries corresponding to Greek word, μυστήριον (mysterion), and also to rites that in the Western tradition are called sacramentals and to other realities, such as the Church itself. Many Protestant denominations, such as those within the Reformed tradition, preach just two sacraments instituted by Christ: the Eucharist (or Holy Communion) and Baptism. The Lutheran sacraments include these two, often adding Confession (and Absolution) as a third sacrament. Anglican and Methodist teaching is that "there are two Sacraments ordained of Christ our Lord in the Gospel, that is to say, Baptism and the Supper of the Lord", and that "those five commonly called Sacraments, that is to say, Confirmation, Penance, Orders, Matrimony, and Extreme Unction, are not to be counted for Sacraments of the Gospel."

Some traditions, such as the Religious Society of Friends do not observe any of the rites, or, in the case of the Plymouth Brethren, hold that they are simply reminders or commendable practices that do not impart actual grace—not sacraments but "ordinances" pertaining to certain aspects of the Christian faith.

== Generic meaning ==
An example of the generic meaning of "sacrament" can be seen in the work of theologian Edward Schillebeeckx: Christ, the sacrament of the encounter with God. Jean-Pierre de Caussade referred to the "sacrament of the present moment" in his treatise on "Abandonment to Divine Providence", while the Second Vatican Council referred to "the wondrous sacrament of the whole Church", and Pope Francis spoke of Jesus' love for humankind as a sacrament: "his human emotions became the sacrament of that infinite and endless love".

== Etymology ==
The English word sacrament is derived indirectly from the Ecclesiastical Latin sacrāmentum, from the Latin sacrō ('hallow, consecrate'), itself derive from the Latin sacer ('sacred, holy'). In Ancient Rome, the term meant a soldier's oath of allegiance. Tertullian, a 3rd-century Christian writer, suggested that just as the soldier's oath was a sign of the beginning of a new life, so too was initiation into the Christian community through baptism and Eucharist.

== Summary table ==
Denomination	Baptism	Confirmation	Holy Communion	Penance	Marriage	Holy orders	Anointing of the sick	Holy Leaven	Sign of the cross
Catholic	Yes	Yes	Yes	Yes	Yes	Yes	Yes	No	No
Eastern Orthodox	Yes	Yes (Chrismation)	Yes	Yes	Yes	Yes	Yes	No	No
Oriental Orthodox	Yes	Yes (Chrismation)	Yes	Yes	Yes	Yes	Yes	No	No
Church of the East	Yes	Yes (Chrismation)	Yes	Yes	No	Yes	No	Yes	Yes
Hussite	Yes	Yes	Yes	Yes	Yes	Yes	Yes	No	No
Moravian	Yes	Yes	Yes	No	Yes	Yes	No	No	No
Lutheran	Yes	No	Yes	Yes	No	Maybe	No	No	No
Anglo-Catholicism	Yes	Yes	Yes	Yes	Yes	Yes	Yes	No	No
Broad Church Anglicanism	Yes	Maybe (Note: Most broad church Anglicans recognize Confession/Absolution, Matrimony, Confirmation, Holy Orders (also called Ordination), and Anointing of the Sick (also called Unction) as "sacramental rites" which are not sacrament but still more important than other rites.)	Yes	Maybe	Maybe	Maybe	Maybe	No	No
Center Church Anglicanism	Yes	No	Yes	No	No	No	No	No	No
Evangelical Anglicanism	Yes	No	Yes	No	No	No	No	No	No
Methodism	Yes	No	Yes	No	No	No	No	No	No
Reformed	Yes	No	Yes	No	No	No	No	No	No
Baptists	Yes	Maybe (Note: The General Baptists recognized Confirmation as a "holy rite ordained by Jesus Christ", but not as a sacrament.)	Yes	No	No	No	No	No	No
Irvingism	Yes	Yes (Holy Sealing)	Yes	No	No	No	No	No	No
Latter-Day Saints	Yes	Yes	Yes	No	Yes	Yes	Yes	No	No

== Catholicism ==
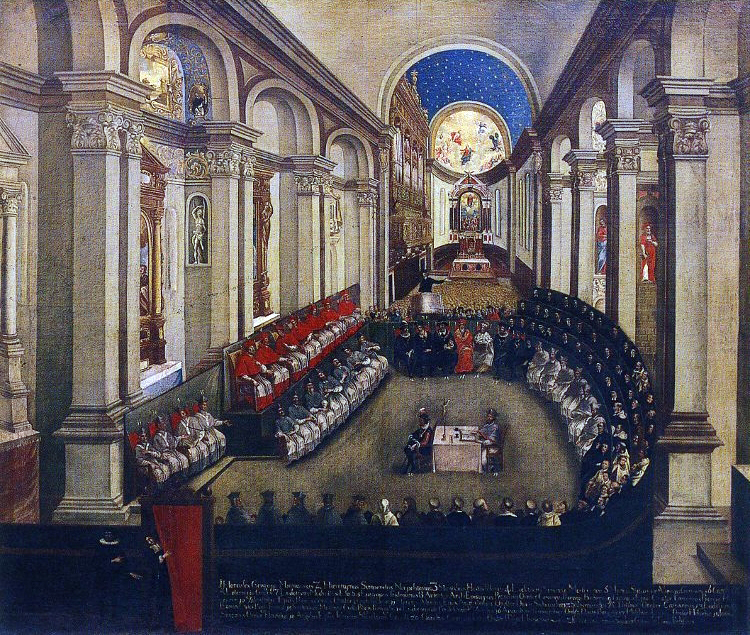
The Council of Trent defined the seven sacraments.

Catholic theology enumerates seven sacraments: Baptism, Confirmation (Chrismation), Eucharist (Communion), Penance (Reconciliation, Confession), Matrimony (Marriage), Holy Orders (ordination to the diaconate, priesthood, or episcopate) and Anointing of the Sick (before the Second Vatican Council generally called Extreme Unction). The list of seven sacraments already given by the Second Council of Lyon (1274) and the Council of Florence (1439) was reaffirmed by the Council of Trent (1545–1563), which stated:

CANON I. – If any one saith, that the sacraments of the New Law were not all instituted by Jesus Christ, our Lord; or that they are more, or less, than seven, to wit, Baptism, Confirmation, the Eucharist, Penance, Extreme Unction, Order, and Matrimony; or even that any one of these seven is not truly and properly a sacrament; let him be anathema.

[...]

CANON IV. – If any one saith, that the sacraments of the New Law are not necessary unto salvation, but superfluous; and that, without them, or without the desire thereof, men obtain of God, through faith alone, the grace of justification; – though all (the sacraments) are not necessary for every individual; let him be anathema.

During the Middle Ages, sacramental records were in Latin. Even after the Reformation, many ecclesiastical leaders continued using this practice into the 20th century. On occasion, Protestant ministers followed the same practice. Since W was not part of the Latin alphabet, scribes only used it when dealing with names or places. In addition, names were modified to fit a "Latin mold". For instance, the name Joseph would be rendered as Iosephus or Josephus.

The Catholic Church indicates that the sacraments are necessary for salvation, though not every sacrament is necessary for every individual. The Church applies this teaching even to the sacrament of baptism, the gateway to the other sacraments. It states that "Baptism is necessary for salvation for those to whom the Gospel has been proclaimed and who have had the possibility of asking for this sacrament." But it adds: "God has bound salvation to the sacrament of Baptism, but he himself is not bound by his sacraments," and accordingly, "since Christ died for the salvation of all, those can be saved without Baptism who die for the faith (Baptism of blood). Catechumens and all those who, even without knowing Christ and the Church, still (under the impulse of grace) sincerely seek God and strive to do his will can also be saved without Baptism (Baptism of desire). The Church in her liturgy entrusts children who die without Baptism to the mercy of God."

In the teaching of the Catholic Church, "the sacraments are efficacious signs of grace, instituted by Christ and entrusted to the Church, by which divine life is dispensed to us. The visible rites by which the sacraments are celebrated signify and make present the graces proper to each sacrament. They bear fruit in those who receive them with the required dispositions."

While the sacraments in the Catholic Church are regarded as means of Divine Grace, the Catholic definition of a sacrament is an event in Christian life that is both spiritual and physical. The seven Catholic sacraments have been separated into three groups. The first three Sacraments of Initiation are Baptism, Communion, and Confirmation. The two Healing Sacraments are Anointing of the Sick and Penance. The two Sacraments of Vocation are Matrimony and Holy Orders.

The Church teaches that the effect of the sacraments comes ex opere operato, by the very fact of being administered, regardless of the personal holiness of the minister administering it. However, as indicated in this definition of the sacraments given by the Catechism of the Catholic Church, a recipient's own lack of proper disposition to receive the grace conveyed can block a sacrament's effectiveness in that person. The sacraments presuppose faith and, through their words and ritual elements, nourish, strengthen and give expression to faith.

Though not every individual has to receive every sacrament, the Church affirms that for believers the sacraments are necessary for salvation. Through each of them, Christ bestows that sacrament's particular healing and transforming grace of the Holy Spirit, making them participants in the divine nature through union with Christ.

== Eastern Orthodoxy and Oriental Orthodoxy ==
The Eastern Orthodox tradition does not limit the number of sacraments to seven, holding that anything the Church does as Church is in some sense sacramental. However, it recognizes these seven as "the major sacraments" which are completed by many other blessings and special services. Some lists of the sacraments taken from the Church Fathers include the consecration of a church, monastic tonsure, and the burial of the dead. More specifically, for the Eastern Orthodox the term "sacrament" is a term which seeks to classify something that may, according to Orthodox thought, be impossible to classify. The Orthodox communion's preferred term is "Sacred Mystery", and the Orthodox communion has refrained from attempting to determine absolutely the exact form, number and effect of the sacraments, accepting simply that these elements are unknowable to all except God. On a broad level, the mysteries are an affirmation of the goodness of created matter, and are an emphatic declaration of what that matter was originally created to be.

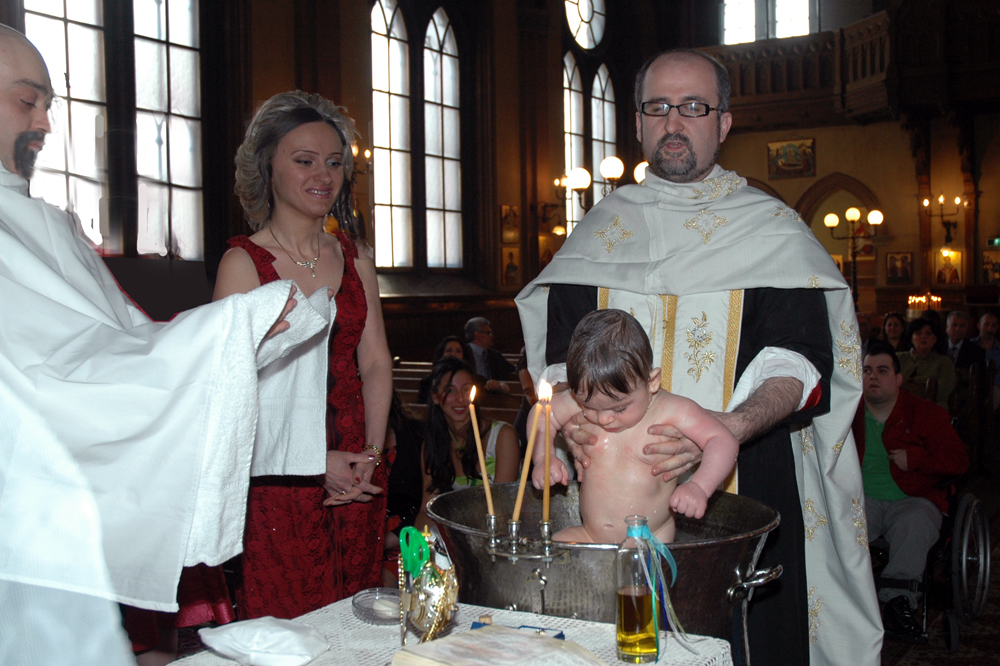
Baptism and Chrismation, the sacraments of initiation, in an Eastern Orthodox church

Despite this broad view, Orthodox divines do write about there being seven "principal" mysteries. On a specific level, while not systematically limiting the mysteries to seven, the most profound Mystery is the Eucharist or Synaxis, in which the partakers, by participation in the liturgy and receiving the consecrated bread and wine (understood to have become the body and blood of Christ) directly communicate with God. No claim is made to understand how exactly this happens. The Eastern Orthodox merely state: "This appears to be in the form of bread and wine, but God has told me it is His Body and Blood. I will take what He says as a 'mystery' and not attempt to rationalize it to my limited mind".

The seven sacraments are also accepted by Oriental Orthodoxy, including the Coptic Orthodox Church, Ethiopian Orthodox Tewahedo Church, and the Armenian Orthodox Church.

== Hussite Church and Moravian Church ==
The Czechoslovak Hussite Church recognizes seven sacraments: baptism, eucharist, penance, confirmation, holy matrimony, holy orders, and anointing of the sick.

The Moravian Church administers the sacraments of baptism and eucharist, as well as the rites of confirmation, holy matrimony, and holy orders.

== Lutheranism ==
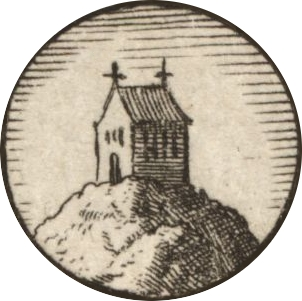
The Church is the congregation of saints, in which the Gospel is rightly taught and the Sacraments are rightly administered. - Augsburg Confession

Lutherans hold that sacraments are sacred acts of divine institution. Whenever they are properly administered by the use of the physical component commanded by God along with the divine words of institution, God is, in a way specific to each sacrament, present with the Word and physical component. He earnestly offers to all who receive the sacrament forgiveness of sins and eternal salvation. He also works in the recipients to get them to accept these blessings and to increase the assurance of their possession.

Melanchthon's Apology of the Augsburg Confession defines sacraments, according to the German text, as "outward signs and ceremonies that have God's command and have an attached divine promise of graces". His Latin text was shorter: "rites that have the command of God, and to which is added a promise of grace". This strict definition narrowed the number of sacraments down to three: Holy Baptism, the Eucharist, and Holy Absolution. Lutherans do not dogmatically define the exact number of sacraments. Luther's initial statement in his Large Catechism speaks of two sacraments, Baptism and the Eucharist, in addition to Confession and Absolution, "the third sacrament". The definition of sacrament in the Apology of the Augsburg Confession lists Absolution as one of them. Although Lutherans do not consider the other four rites as sacraments, they are still retained and used in the Lutheran church. Luther himself around the time of his marriage and afterwards became one of the greatest champions of Marriage (Holy Matrimony), and the other two (Confirmation and Ordination) were kept in the Lutheran Church for purposes of good order. Within Lutheranism, the sacraments are a Means of Grace, and, together with the Word of God, empower the Church for mission.

== Anglicanism and Methodism ==
Anglican and Methodist sacramental theology reflects its dual roots in the Catholic tradition and the Protestant Reformation. The Catholic heritage is perhaps most strongly asserted in the importance Anglicanism and Methodism places on the sacraments as a means of grace and sanctification, while the Reformed tradition has contributed a marked insistence on "lively faith" and "worthy reception". Anglican and Catholic theologians participating in an Anglican/Catholic Joint Preparatory Commission declared that they had "reached substantial agreement on the doctrine of the Eucharist". Similarly, Methodist/Catholic Dialogue has affirmed that "Methodists and Catholics affirm the real presence of Christ in the Eucharist. This reality does not depend on the experience of the communicant, although it is only by faith that we become aware of Christ's presence." The Catholic Church and the World Methodist Council jointly understand the word "sacrament" as referring not only to the sacraments considered here, but also to Christ and the Church.

Article XXV of the Thirty-Nine Articles in Anglicanism and Article XVI of the Articles of Religion in Methodism recognise only two sacraments (Baptism and the Supper of the Lord) since these are the only ones ordained by Christ in the Gospel. The article continues stating that "Those five commonly called Sacraments ... are not to be counted for Sacraments of the Gospel ... but have not the like nature of Sacraments with Baptism and the Lord's Supper, for they have not any visible sign or ceremony ordained by God." These phrases have led to a debate as to whether the five are to be called sacraments or not. A recent author writes that the Anglican Church gives "sacramental value to the other five recognized by the Catholic and Orthodox Churches" but these "do not reveal those essential aspects of redemption to which Baptism and Communion point". Some Anglicans maintain that the use of "commonly" implies that the others can legitimately be called sacraments (perhaps more exactly "Sacraments of the Church" as opposed to "Sacraments of the Gospel"); others object that at the time the Articles were written "commonly" meant "inaccurately" and point out that the Prayer Book refers to the creeds "commonly called the Apostles' Creed" and the "Athanasian" where both attributions are historically incorrect.

Anglicans are also divided as to the effects of the sacraments. Some hold views similar to the Catholic ex opere operato theory. Article XXVI (entitled Of the unworthiness of ministers which hinders not the effect of the Sacrament) states that the "ministration of the Word and Sacraments" is not done in the name of the minister, "neither is the effect of Christ's ordinance taken away by their wickedness," since the sacraments have their effect "because of Christ's intention and promise, although they be ministered by evil men". As in Catholic theology, the worthiness or unworthiness of the recipient is of great importance. Article XXV in the Thirty-Nine Articles of Anglicanism and Article XVI in the Articles of Religion in Methodism states: "And in such only as worthily receive the [sacraments], they have a wholesome effect and operation: but they that receive them unworthily purchase for themselves damnation," and Article XXVIII in Anglicanism's Thirty-Nine Articles (Article XVIII in Methodism's Articles of Religion) on the Lord's Supper affirms "to such as rightly, worthily, and with faith, receive the same, the Bread which we break is a partaking of the Body of Christ". In the Exhortations of the Prayer Book rite, the worthy communicant is bidden to "prepare himself by examination of conscience, repentance and amendment of life and above all to ensure that he is in love and charity with his neighbours" and those who are not "are warned to withdraw".

This particular question was fiercely debated in the 19th century arguments over Baptismal Regeneration, culminating in the Gorham Case, wherein the Church of England decided in favor of Baptismal Regeneration, but the secular court overruled them.

== Reformed (Continental Reformed, Congregationalist, and Presbyterian) ==
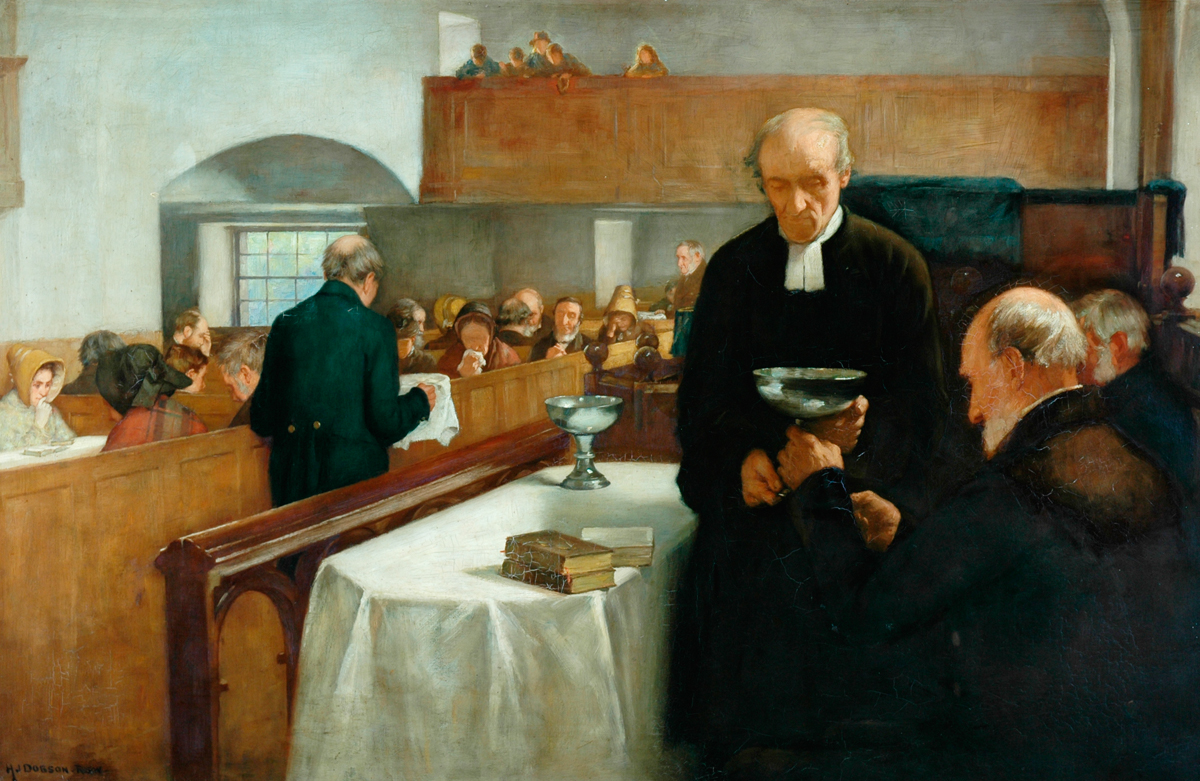
Henry John Dobson's A Scottish Sacrament

John Calvin defined a sacrament as an earthly sign associated with a promise from God. He accepted only two sacraments as valid under the new covenant: baptism and the Lord's Supper. He and all Reformed theologians following him completely rejected the Catholic doctrine of transubstantiation and the treatment of the Supper as a sacrifice. He also could not accept the Lutheran doctrine of sacramental union in which Christ was "in, with and under" the elements.

The Westminster Confession of Faith also limits the sacraments to baptism and the Lord's Supper. Sacraments are denoted "signs and seals of the covenant of grace". Westminster speaks of "a sacramental relation, or a sacramental union, between the sign and the thing signified; whence it comes to pass that the names and effects of the one are attributed to the other". Baptism is for infant children of believers as well as believers, as it is for all the Reformed except Particular Baptists and some Congregationalists. Baptism admits the baptized into the visible church, and in it all the benefits of Christ are offered to the baptized. On the Lord's supper, Westminster takes a position between Lutheran sacramental union and Zwinglian memorialism: "the Lord's supper really and indeed, yet not carnally and corporally, but spiritually, receive and feed upon Christ crucified, and all benefits of his death: the body and blood of Christ being then not corporally or carnally in, with, or under the bread and wine; yet, as really, but spiritually, present to the faith of believers in that ordinance as the elements themselves are to their outward senses."

== Baptists ==
In the Baptist tradition, both the terms "sacrament" and "ordinance" have been used in reference to Baptism and the Lord's Supper.

== Irvingism ==
Irvingian denominations such as the New Apostolic Church teach three sacraments: Baptism, Holy Communion and Holy Sealing.

== Latter-day Saints ==
Members of the Latter-day Saint movement often use the word "ordinance" in the place of the word "sacrament", but the actual theology is sacramental in nature. Latter-day Saint ordinances are understood as conferring an invisible form of grace of a saving nature and are required for salvation and exaltation. Latter-day Saints often use the word "sacrament" to refer specifically to the Sacrament of the Lord's Supper, also known as the Lord's Supper, in which participants eat bread and drink wine (or water, since the late 1800s) as tokens of the flesh and blood of Christ. In Latter-day Saint congregations, the sacrament is normally provided every Sunday as part of the sacrament meeting and, like other Latter-day Saint ordinances such as baptism and confirmation, is considered an essential and sacred rite. Latter-day Saint ordinances which are considered "saving" include baptism, confirmation, sacrament of the Lord's Supper (Eucharist), ordination (for males), initiatory (called Chrismation in other Christian traditions), endowment (similar to a monastic initiation involving the taking of vows and reception of priestly clothing), and marriage. In the Community of Christ, eight sacraments are recognized, including "baptism, confirmation, blessing of children, the Lord's Supper, ordination, marriage, the Evangelist Blessing, and administration to the sick".

== Other traditions ==
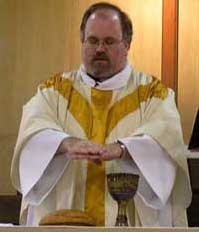
The Eucharist is considered a sacrament, ordinance, or equivalent in most Christian denominations.

The enumeration, naming, understanding, and the adoption of the sacraments formally vary according to denomination, although the finer theological distinctions are not always understood and may not even be known to many of the faithful. Many Protestants and other post-Reformation traditions affirm Luther's definition and have only Baptism and Eucharist (or Communion or the Lord's Supper) as sacraments, while others see the ritual as merely symbolic, and still others do not have a sacramental dimension at all.

In addition to the traditional seven sacraments, other rituals have been considered sacraments by some Christian traditions. In particular, foot washing as seen in Anabaptist, Schwarzenau Brethren groups or True Jesus Church, and the hearing of the Gospel, as understood by a few Christian groups (such as the Polish National Catholic Church of America), have been considered sacraments by some churches. The Assyrian Church of the East holds the Holy Leaven and the sign of the cross as sacraments.

Since some post-Reformation denominations do not regard clergy as having a classically sacerdotal or priestly function, they avoid the term "sacrament", preferring the terms "sacerdotal function", "ordinance", or "tradition". This belief invests the efficacy of the ordinance in the obedience and participation of the believer and the witness of the presiding minister and the congregation. This view stems from a highly developed concept of the priesthood of all believers. In this sense, the believer himself or herself performs the sacerdotal role.

Plymouth Brethren and Pentecostals, among certain other Christian denominations, use the word ordinance rather than sacrament because of certain sacerdotal ideas connected, in their view, with the word sacrament. These churches argue that the word ordinance points to the ordaining authority of Christ which lies behind the practice.

=== Non-sacramental churches ===
Some denominations do not have a sacramental dimension (or equivalent) at all. The Salvation Army does not practice formal sacraments for a variety of reasons, including a belief that it is better to concentrate on the reality behind the symbols; however, it does not forbid its members from receiving sacraments in other denominations.

The Quakers (Religious Society of Friends) also do not practice formal sacraments, believing that all of life has the potential to be the means of God's grace. Quaker emphasize the inward transformation of one's whole life. Some Quakers use the words "Baptism" and "Communion" to describe the experience of Christ's presence and his ministry in worship.

The Clancularii were an Anabaptist group in the 16th century who reasoned that because religion was seated in the heart, there was no need of any outward expression through the sacraments.

== See also ==
- Filakto
- Sacramental bread
