= Adrian Hamsted =

Dutch founder of the Adrianist sect

Adrian Hamsted (also known as Adriaen van Haemstede) was the eponymous Dutch founder of the sect of Adrianists.

Hamsted was born at Dordrecht in 1524. He was a minister in London at the Dutch Church in Austin Friars for some time. After the Act of Uniformity 1558 forced the Anabaptists to meet in secret, Hamsted submitted a petition on their behalf to the bishop, Edmund Grindal. Grindal not only refused the petition on their behalf, he demanded that Hamsted renounce his Anabaptist beliefs, and, when he refused, excommunicated him in 1561. Jacopo Aconcio, a member of Hamsted's church, defended him to Grindal, who excommunicated Aconcio as well.

Afterwards, Hamsted travelled to Holland, where he founded the Adrianist sect; he died at Bruges in 1581.

The Adrianists, who were mostly women, were Anabaptists. Most of their specific beliefs are not recorded, but one is that they denied the virgin birth of Jesus.
