= Clancularii =

The Clancularii, or Clancularies, who arose in the 16th century after the Reformation, were a sect of Anabaptists who denied the necessity of making any open profession of the faith and taught that just a private one would be sufficient. They were also called Hortularies and Gardeners because of their preference to assemble and worship in places like these instead of churches. The Clancularii attached very little importance to the sacraments, on the basis that, if religion was seated in the heart, there was no need of any outward expression through the sacraments.

== See also ==
- Sacrament#Non-sacramental churches
