= James M. Stayer =

Canadian historian (1935–2025)

James Mentzer Stayer (15 March 1935 – 23 April 2025) was a Canadian historian specialising in the German Reformation, particularly the anabaptist movement. He was a Professor Emeritus at Queen's University in Kingston, Ontario, Canada. Born in Lancaster County, Pennsylvania, Stayer received his PhD from Cornell University in 1964. After teaching at Ithaca College, Bridgewater College and Bucknell University, he moved to Canada in 1968 to teach at Queen's University. He became a Canadian citizen in 1977. Stayer died on 23 April 2025, at the age of 90.

== Bibliography ==
- Anabaptists and the Sword (1972, 1976)
- The Anabaptists and Thomas Müntzer (1980) (co-edited with Werner O. Packull)
- The German Peasants' War and Anabaptist Community of Goods (1991, 1994)
- Martin Luther, German saviour: German evangelical theological factions and the interpretation of Luther, 1917–1933 (2000)
- Radikalität und Dissent im 16. Jahrhundert/Radicalism and Dissent in the Sixteenth Century (2002) (co-edited with Hans-Jürgen Goertz)
- "A Companion to Anabaptism and Spiritualism, 1521–1700" (2007) (co-edited with John D. Roth)
