= Ludwig Keller =

German archivist and historian

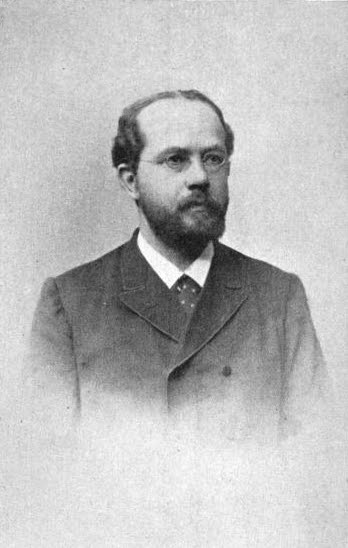
Ludwig Keller

Ludwig Keller (28 May 1849, in Fritzlar – 9 March 1915, in Berlin) was a German archivist and historian, known for his writings on the Reformation, Anabaptism and Freemasonry.

From 1868 he studied at the universities of Leipzig and Marburg, and in 1874 became an archivist at the state archives in Marburg. During his studies, he was a member of the confraternity Marburger Burschenschaft Germania. Shortly afterwards, he relocated to the state archives in Münster, where from 1881 to 1895 he served as director. From 1895 onward, he worked at the classified state archives in Berlin.

In 1897 he was admitted to the Masonic lodge Zur Eintracht und Standhaftigkeit (For unity and steadfastness) in Kassel. In 1899, he joined the Urania zur Unsterblichkeit (Urania for Immortality) lodge in Berlin. He was also Grand Orator of the Royal Grand Lodge of York for Friendship (Großen Landesloge Royale York zur Freundschaft). Within this Grand Lodge he held the position of Supreme Master (Oberster Meiste).

He was the founder and chairman of the Comenius-Gesellschaft zur Pflege der Wissenschaft und der Volksbildung (Comenius Society for the Advancement of Science and Popular Education). He was the author of numerous biographies in the Allgemeine Deutsche Biographie.

== Selected works ==
- Geschichte der Wiedertäufer und ihres Reichs zu Münster, 1880 – History of the Anabaptists and their empire in Münster.
- Die Gegenreformation in Westfalen und am Niederrhein, 1881 – The Counter-Reformation in Westphalia and the Lower Rhine.
- Ein Apostle der Wiedertäufer, 1882 – An apostle of the Anabaptists.
- Die Reformation und die älteren Reformparteien : in ihrem Zusammenhange dargestellt, 1885 – The Reformation and the older reform parties.
- Die Waldenser und die deutschen Bibelübersetzungen, 1886 – The Waldensian and German translations of the Bible.
- Zur Geschichte der altevangelischen Gemeinden : Vortrag, 1887 – On the history of old Evangelical municipalities.
- Johann von Staupitz und die Anfänge der Reformation, 1888 – Johann von Staupitz and the beginnings of the Reformation.
- Die Idee der Humanität und die Comenius-Gesellschaft, 1907 – The concept of humanity and the Comenius Society.
- Die geistigen Grundlagen der Freimaurerei und das öffentliche Leben, 1911 – The intellectual foundations of Freemasonry and public life.
- Die freimaurerei : Eine Einführung in ihre Anschauungswelt und ihre Geschichte, 1914 – Freemasonry: an introduction to its intuitive world and history.

== Bibliography ==
- Wolfgang Heller: Keller, Ludwig. In: Biographisch-Bibliographisches Kirchenlexikon (BBKL). Volume 3, Bautz, Herzberg 1992, ISBN 3-88309-035-2, Sp. 1312–1314.
- Eugen Lennhoff, Oskar Posner, Dieter A. Binder: Internationales Freimaurer Lexikon. Erweiterte Auflage. Herbig, München 2007, ISBN 978-3-7766-5007-5, p. 460 ss.
- Hans Martin Schaller: Keller, Ludwig. In: Neue Deutsche Biographie (NDB). Volume 11, Duncker & Humblot, Berlin 1977, ISBN 3-428-00192-3, p. 463 (Digital copy).
