= Anabaptism =

Christian movement

Anabaptism (from Neo-Latin anabaptista, from the Greek ἀναβαπτισμός: ἀνά 're-' and βαπτισμός 'baptism'; German: Täufer, lit. 'Baptists', earlier also Wiedertäufer) (Note: Since the middle of the 20th century, the German-speaking world no longer uses the term Wiedertäufer (translation: "Re-baptizers"), considering it biased. The term Täufer (translation: "Baptists") is now used, which is considered more impartial. From the perspective of their persecutors, the "Baptists" baptized for the second time those "who as infants had already been baptized". The denigrative term Anabaptist, given to them by others, signifies rebaptizing and is considered a polemical term, so it has been dropped from use in modern German. However, in the English-speaking world, it is still used to distinguish the Anabaptists more clearly from the Baptists, a Protestant tradition that was developed in England years later. Compare their self-designation as "Brethren in Christ" or "Church of God": Stayer, James M. (2001). "Täufer". Theologische Realenzyklopädie (TRE) (in German). Vol. 32. Berlin, New York: Walter de Gruyter. pp. 597–617. ISBN 3-11-016712-3. "Brüder in Christo", "Gemeinde Gottes".) is a Christian movement which traces its origins to the Radical Reformation in the 16th century. Anabaptists believe that baptism is valid only when candidates freely confess their faith in Christ and request to be baptized. This stance, commonly referred to as believer's baptism, is opposed to the baptism of infants, who are not able to make a conscious decision to be baptized.

The early Anabaptists formulated their beliefs in a confession of faith in 1527 called the Schleitheim Confession. Its author Michael Sattler was arrested and executed shortly afterward. Anabaptist groups varied widely in their specific beliefs, but the Schleitheim Confession represents foundational Anabaptist beliefs as well as any single document can.

Other Christian groups with different roots also practice believer's baptism, such as the Baptists, but these groups are not Anabaptist. The Amish, Hutterites and Mennonites are direct descendants of the early Anabaptist movement. The Schwarzenau Brethren, River Brethren, Bruderhof and the Apostolic Christian Church are Anabaptist denominations that developed after the Radical Reformation, following their example. Though all Anabaptists share the same core theological beliefs, there are differences in the way of life among them; Old Order Anabaptist groups include the Old Order Amish, the Old Order Mennonites, Old Order River Brethren and the Old Order German Baptist Brethren. In between the assimilated mainline denominations (such as Mennonite Church USA and the Church of the Brethren) and Old Order groups are Conservative Anabaptist groups. Conservative Anabaptists, such as the Dunkard Brethren Church, Conservative Mennonites and Beachy Amish, have retained traditional religious practices and theology, while allowing for judicious use of modern conveniences and advanced technology.

Emphasizing an adherence to the beliefs of early Christianity, Anabaptists in general are distinguished by their keeping of practices that often include nonconformity to the world: "the love feast with feet washing, laying on of hands, anointing with oil, and the holy kiss, as well as turning the other cheek, no oaths, going the second mile, giving a cup of cold water, reconciliation, repeated forgiveness, humility, non-violence, and sharing possessions."

The name Anabaptist originated as an exonym meaning "one who baptizes again", referring to the practice of baptizing persons when they converted or declared their faith in Christ, when they had already been baptized as infants. Many called themselves "Radical Reformers". Anabaptists require that baptismal candidates be able to make a confession of faith that is freely chosen. They understand the New Testament order is to repent and then be baptized, and infants are unable to repent and turn away from sin to a life of following Jesus; thus infant baptism is invalid. The early members of this movement did not accept the name Anabaptist, claiming that infant baptism was not part of scripture and was therefore null and void. They said that baptizing self-confessed believers was their first true baptism:

I have never taught Anabaptism. ...But the right baptism of Christ, which is preceded by teaching and oral confession of faith, I teach, and say that infant baptism is a robbery of the right baptism of Christ.

— Hubmaier, Balthasar (1526), Short apology.

Anabaptists were heavily persecuted by state churches, both Magisterial Protestants and Roman Catholics, beginning in the 16th century and continuing thereafter, largely because of their interpretation of scripture which put them at odds with official state church interpretations and local government control. Anabaptism was never established by any state and therefore never enjoyed any associated privileges. Most Anabaptists adhere to a literal interpretation of the Sermon on the Mount in Matthew 5–7, which teaches against hate, killing, violence, taking oaths, participating in use of force or any military actions, and against participation in civil government. Anabaptists view themselves as primarily citizens of the kingdom of God, not of earthly nations. As committed followers of Jesus, they seek to pattern their life after his.

Some former groups who practiced rebaptism, now extinct, believed otherwise and complied with these requirements of civil society. (Note: For example, those of the Münster Rebellion or Balthasar Hubmaier.) They were thus technically Anabaptists, even though conservative Amish, Mennonites, Hutterites, and many historians consider them outside Anabaptism. Conrad Grebel wrote in a letter to Thomas Müntzer in 1524: "True Christian believers are sheep among wolves, sheep for the slaughter ... Neither do they use worldly sword or war, since all killing has ceased with them."

== Lineage ==

(Not shown are ante-Nicene, nontrinitarian, and restorationist denominations.)

=== Medieval forerunners ===
Anabaptists are considered to have begun with the Radical Reformation in the 16th century, but historians classify certain people and groups as their forerunners because of a similar approach to the interpretation and application of the Bible. For instance, Petr Chelčický, a 15th-century Bohemian reformer, taught most of the beliefs considered integral to Anabaptist theology. Medieval antecedents may include the Brethren of the Common Life, the Hussites, Dutch Sacramentists, and some forms of monasticism. The Waldensians also represent a faith similar to the Anabaptists.

Medieval dissenters and Anabaptists who held to a literal interpretation of the Sermon on the Mount share in common the following affirmations:

- The believer must not swear oaths or refer disputes between believers to law-courts for resolution, in accordance with 1 Corinthians 6:1–11.
- The believer must not bear arms or offer forcible resistance to wrongdoers, nor wield the sword. No Christian has the jus gladii (the right of the sword). Matthew 5:39
- Civil government (i.e. "Caesar") belongs to the world. The believer belongs to God's kingdom so must not fill any office nor hold any rank under government, which is to be passively obeyed. John 18:36 Romans 13:1–7
- Sinners or unfaithful ones are to be excommunicated and excluded from the sacraments and from some level of interaction with believers until they repent, according to 1 Corinthians 5:9–13 and Matthew 18:15 seq., but no force is to be used towards them.

=== Zwickau prophets and the German Peasants' War ===
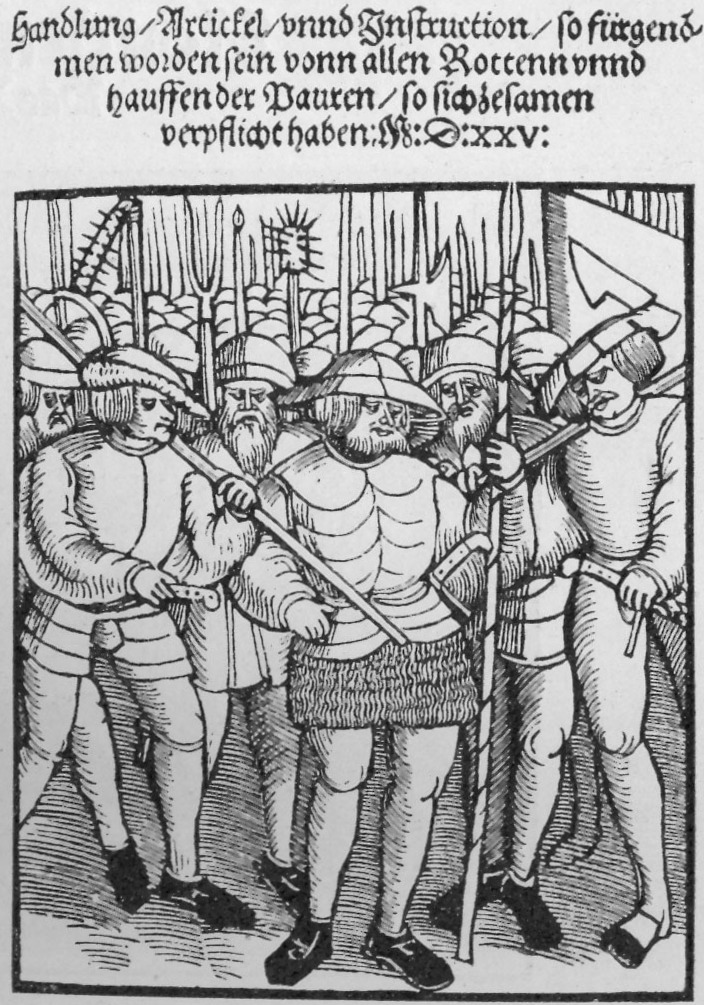
Twelve Articles of the Peasants pamphlet of 1525

On December 27, 1521, three "prophets" from Zwickau appeared in Wittenberg who were influenced by (and, in turn, influencing) Thomas Müntzer – Thomas Dreschel, Nicholas Storch, and Mark Thomas Stübner. They preached an apocalyptic, radical alternative to Lutheranism. Their preaching helped to stir the feelings concerning the social crisis which erupted in the German Peasants' War in southern Germany in 1525 as a revolt against feudal oppression.

Under the leadership of Müntzer, it became a war against all constituted authorities and an attempt to establish by revolution an ideal Christian commonwealth, with absolute equality among persons and the community of goods. The Zwickau prophets were not Anabaptists (that is, they did not practise "rebaptism"); nevertheless, the prevalent social inequities and the preaching of men such as these have been seen as laying the foundation for the Anabaptist movement. The social ideals of the Anabaptist movement coincided closely with those of leaders in the German Peasants' War. Studies have found a very low percentage of subsequent sectarians to have taken part in the peasant uprising.

=== Views on origins ===
Research on the origins of the Anabaptists has been tainted both by the attempts of their enemies to slander them and by the attempts of their supporters to vindicate them. It was long popular to classify all Anabaptists as Munsterites and radicals associated with the Zwickau prophets, Jan Matthys, John of Leiden, and Müntzer. Those desiring to correct this error tended to over-correct and deny all connections between the larger Anabaptist movement and the most radical elements.

The modern era of Anabaptist historiography arose with Roman Catholic scholar Carl Adolf Cornelius' publication of Die Geschichte des Münsterischen Aufruhrs (The History of the Münster Uprising) in 1855. Baptist historian Albert Henry Newman, who Harold S. Bender said occupied "first position in the field of American Anabaptist historiography", made a major contribution with his A History of Anti-Pedobaptism (1897).

Three main theories on origins of the Anabaptists are the following:

- The movement began in a single expression in Zürich and spread from there (monogenesis);
- It developed through several independent movements (polygenesis); and
- It was a continuation of true New Testament Christianity (apostolic succession or church perpetuity).

==== Monogenesis ====
Some scholars (e.g. Harold S. Bender, William Estep, Robert Friedmann) consider the Anabaptist movement to have developed from the Swiss Brethren movement. They generally argue that Anabaptism had its origins in Zürich and that the Anabaptism of the Swiss Brethren was transmitted to southern Germany, Austria, the Netherlands, and northern Germany, where it developed into its various branches. The monogenesis theory usually rejects the Münsterites and other radicals from the category of true Anabaptists. In the monogenesis view the time of origin is January 21, 1525, when Conrad Grebel baptized George Blaurock, and Blaurock in turn baptized several others immediately. These baptisms were the first "re-baptisms" known in the movement. This continues to be the most widely accepted date posited for the establishment of Anabaptism.

==== Polygenesis ====
James M. Stayer, Werner O. Packull, and Klaus Deppermann disputed the idea of a single origin of Anabaptists in a 1975 essay entitled "From Monogenesis to Polygenesis", suggesting that February 24, 1527, at Schleitheim is the proper date of the origin of Anabaptism. On this date the Swiss Brethren wrote a declaration of belief called the Schleitheim Confession. The authors of the essay note the agreement among previous Anabaptist historians on polygenesis, even when disputing the date for a single starting point: "Hillerbrand and Bender (like Holl and Troeltsch) were in agreement that there was a single dispersion of Anabaptism ..., which certainly ran through Zurich. The only question was whether or not it went back further to Saxony."

After criticizing the standard polygenetic history, the authors found six groups in early Anabaptism which could be collapsed into three originating "points of departure": "South German Anabaptism, the Swiss Brethren, and the Melchiorites". According to their polygenesis theory, South German–Austrian Anabaptism "was a diluted form of Rhineland mysticism", Swiss Anabaptism "arose out of Reformed congregationalism", and Dutch Anabaptism was formed by "Social unrest and the apocalyptic visions of Melchior Hoffman". As examples of how the Anabaptist movement was influenced from sources other than the Swiss Brethren movement, mention has been made of how Pilgram Marpeck's Vermanung of 1542 was deeply influenced by the Bekenntnisse of 1533 by Münster theologian Bernhard Rothmann. Hoffman influenced the Hutterites when they used his commentary on the Apocalypse shortly after he wrote it.

Others who have written in support of polygenesis include Grete Mecenseffy and Walter Klaassen, who established links between Müntzer and Hans Hut. In another work, Gottfried Seebaß and Werner Packull show the influence of Müntzer on the formation of South German Anabaptism. Similarly, author Steven Ozment links Hut and Hans Denck with Müntzer, Sebastian Franck, and others. Author Calvin Pater shows how Andreas Karlstadt influenced Swiss Anabaptism in various areas, including his view of Scripture, doctrine of the church, and views on baptism.

Several historians, including Thor Hall, Kenneth Davis, and Robert Kreider, have also noted the influence of humanism on Radical Reformers in the three originating points of departure to account for how this brand of reform could develop independently from each other. Relatively recent research, begun in a more advanced and deliberate manner by Andrew P. Klager, also explores how the influence and a particular reading of the Church Fathers contributed to the development of distinctly Anabaptist beliefs and practices in separate regions of Europe in the early 16th century, including by Menno Simons in the Netherlands, Grebel in Switzerland, Müntzer in central Germany, Marpeck in the Tyrol, Peter Walpot in Moravia, and especially Balthasar Hubmaier in southern Germany, Switzerland, and Moravia.

==== Apostolic succession ====
Baptist successionists have at times pointed to 16th-century Anabaptists as part of an apostolic succession of churches ("church perpetuity") from the time of Christ. This view is held by some conservative and fundamentalist Baptists, some Mennonites, and some "true church" movements. (Note: A "true church" movement is a part of the Protestant or Reformed group of Christianity that claims to represent the true faith and order of New Testament Christianity. Most only assert this in relation to their church doctrines, polity, and practice (e.g., the ordinances), while a few hold they are the only true Christians. Some examples of Anabaptistic true church movements are the Landmark Baptists and the Church of God in Christ, Mennonite. The Church of God, the Stone-Campbell restoration movement, and others represent a variation in which the "true church" apostatized and was restored, in distinction to this idea of apostolic or church succession. These groups trace their "true church" status through means other than those generally accepted by Roman Catholicism or Orthodox Christianity, both of which likewise claim to represent the true faith and order of New Testament Christianity.) Modern scholarship and Baptists, however, opposes this theory by pointing out that these non-Catholic groups had no connection with one another, had origins that were separate both in time and in place, and clearly differed theologically from each other, seeing that some held heretical views. (Note: Such as the Adoptionism of the Paulicianists; some of the other groups often cited were in fact little different from the Catholics and bore little similarity to modern Baptists.)

A different strain of successionism is the theory that the Anabaptists are of Waldensian origin. Some hold the idea that the Waldensians are part of the apostolic succession, while others simply believe they were an independent group out of whom the Anabaptists arose. Ludwig Keller, Thomas M. Lindsay, Henry Clay Vedder, Delbert Grätz, John T. Christian and Thieleman J. van Braght (author of Martyrs Mirror) all held, in varying degrees, the position that the Anabaptists were of Waldensian origin.

== History ==
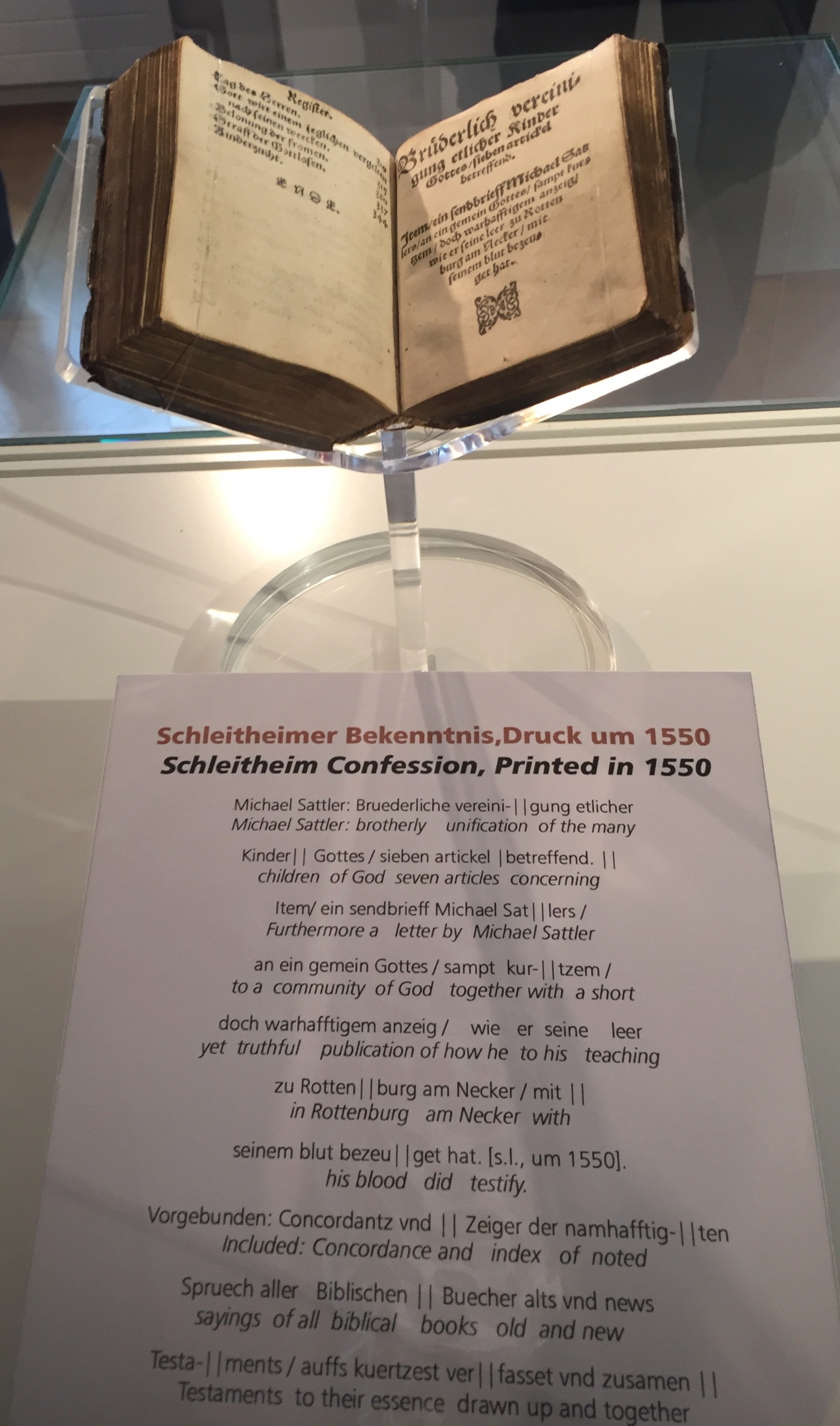
Schleitheim Confession printed in 1550, displayed in the Anabaptist Room of the Local History Museum in Schleitheim, Switzerland

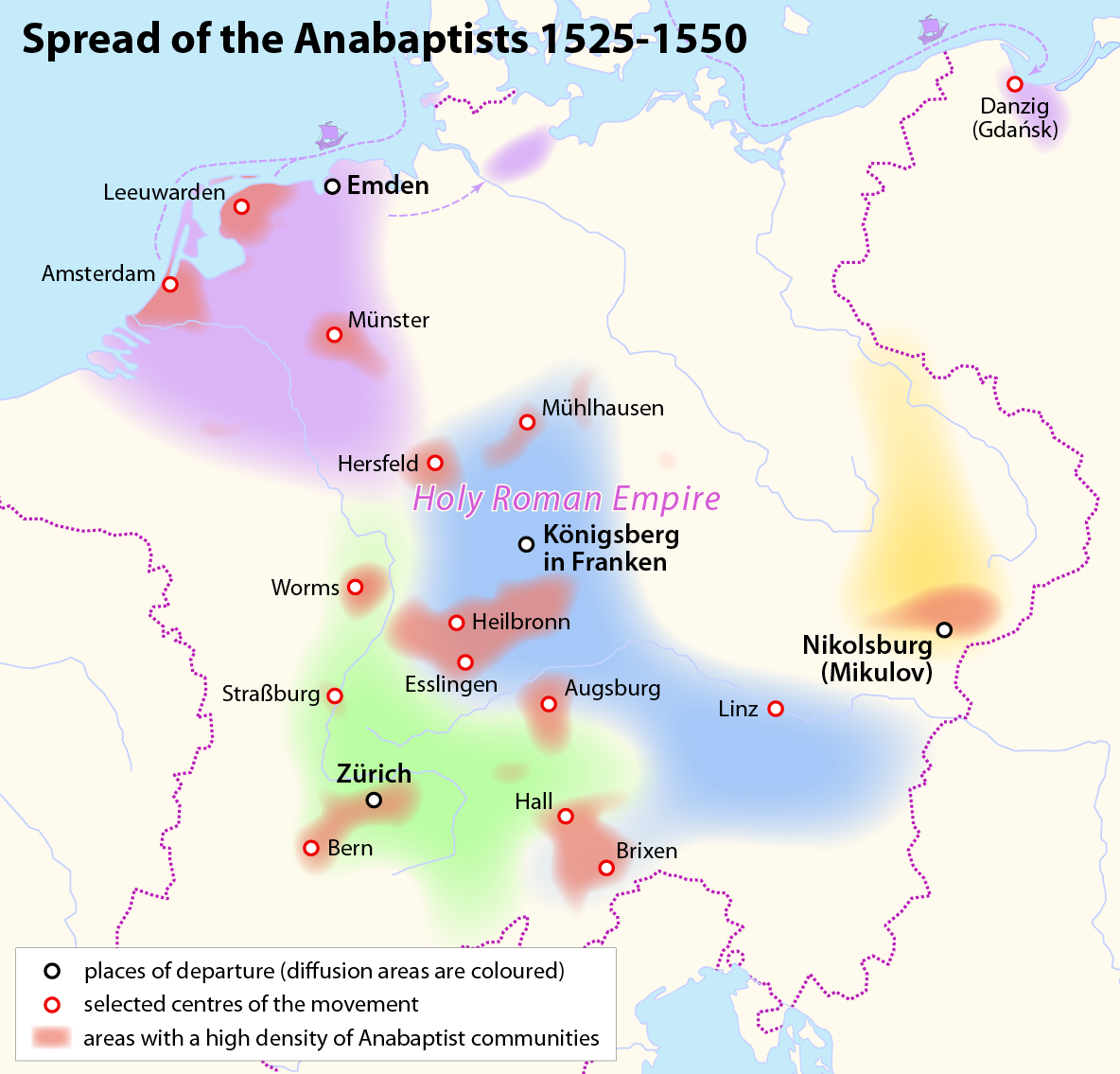
Spread of the early Anabaptists in Central Europe Dutch Mennonites (spread from Emden) South and Central German Anabaptists (spread from Königsberg in Franken) Swiss Brethren (spread from Zürich) Moravian Anabaptists (spread from Nikolsburg)

=== Switzerland ===
Anabaptism in Switzerland began as an offshoot of the church reforms instigated by Ulrich Zwingli. As early as 1522, it became evident that Zwingli was on a path of reform preaching when he began to question or criticize such Catholic practices as tithes, the mass, and even infant baptism. Zwingli had gathered a group of reform-minded men around him, with whom he studied classical literature and the scriptures. However, some of these young men began to feel that Zwingli was not moving fast enough in his reform. The division between Zwingli and his more radical disciples became apparent in an October 1523 disputation held in Zurich. When the discussion of the mass was about to be ended without making any actual change in practice, Conrad Grebel stood up and asked "what should be done about the mass?" Zwingli responded by saying the council would make that decision. At this point, Simon Stumpf, a radical priest from Höngg, answered saying, "The decision has already been made by the Spirit of God."

This incident illustrated clearly that Zwingli and his more radical disciples had different expectations. To Zwingli, the reforms would only go as fast as the city council allowed them. To the radicals, the council had no right to make that decision, but rather the Bible was the final authority of church reform. Feeling frustrated, some of them began to meet on their own for Bible study. As early as 1523, William Reublin began to preach against infant baptism in villages surrounding Zurich, encouraging parents to not baptize their children.

Seeking fellowship with other reform-minded people, the radical group wrote letters to Martin Luther, Andreas Karlstadt, and Thomas Müntzer. Felix Manz began to publish some of Karlstadt's writings in Zurich in late 1524. By this time the question of infant baptism had become agitated, and the Zurich council had instructed Zwingli to meet weekly with those who rejected infant baptism "until the matter could be resolved". Zwingli broke off the meetings after two sessions, and Manz petitioned the council to find a solution, since he felt Zwingli was too hard to work with. The council then called a meeting for January 17, 1525.

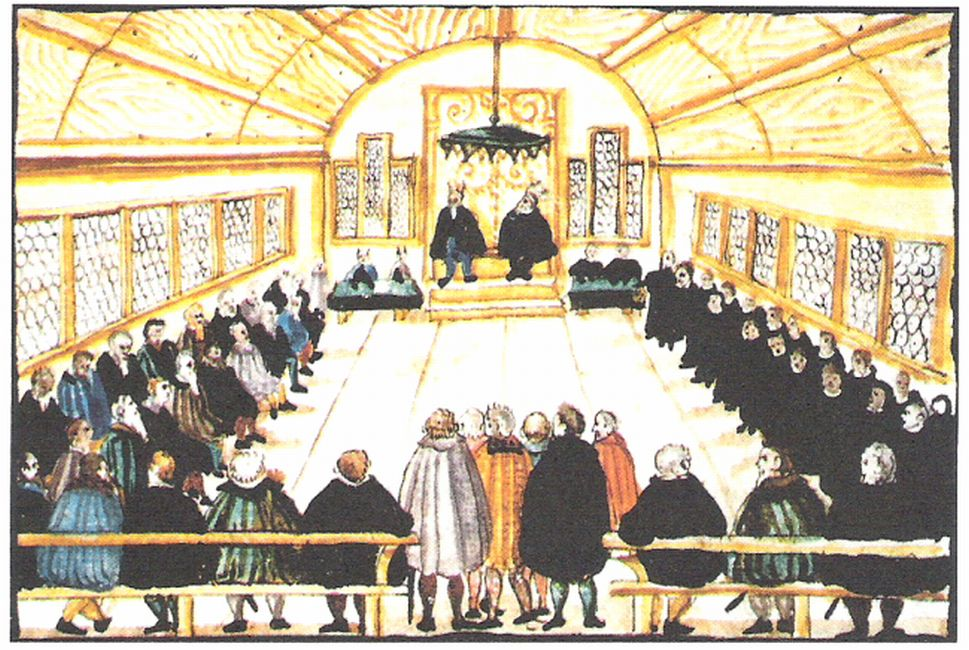
Dissatisfaction with the outcome of a disputation in 1525 prompted Swiss Brethren to part ways with Huldrych Zwingli.

The council ruled in this meeting that all who continued to refuse to baptize their infants should be expelled from Zurich if they did not have them baptized within one week. Since Grebel had refused to baptize his daughter Rachel, born on January 5, 1525, the council decision was personal to him and others who had not baptized their children. Thus, when 16 of the radicals met on January 21, the situation seemed particularly dark. The Hutterian Chronicle records the event:

After prayer, George of the House of Jacob (George Blaurock) stood up and besought Conrad Grebel for God's sake to baptize him with the true Christian baptism upon his faith and knowledge. And when he knelt down with such a request and desire, Conrad baptized him, since at that time there was no ordained minister to perform such work.

Afterwards Blaurock was baptized, and he in turn baptized others at the meeting. Even though some had rejected infant baptism before this date, these baptisms marked the first re-baptisms of those who had been baptized as infants and thus Swiss Anabaptism was born on that day.

=== Tyrol ===
Anabaptism appears to have come to Tyrol through the labors of Blaurock. Similar to the German Peasants' War, the Gaismair uprising set the stage by producing a hope for social justice. Michael Gaismair had tried to bring religious, political, and economic reform through a violent peasant uprising, but the movement was quashed. Although little evidence exists of a connection between Gaismair's uprising and Tyrolian Anabaptism, at least a few of the peasants involved in the uprising later became Anabaptists. The common link was the desire for a radical change in the prevailing social injustices. Disappointed with the failure of armed revolt, Anabaptist ideals of an alternative peaceful, just society probably resonated on the ears of the disappointed peasants.

Before Anabaptism was introduced to South Tyrol, Protestant ideas had been propagated in the region by men such as Hans Vischer, a former Dominican. Some of those who participated in conventicles where Protestant ideas were presented later became Anabaptists. The population in general seemed to have a favorable attitude towards reform, be it Protestant or Anabaptist. Blaurock appears to have preached itinerantly in the Puster Valley region in 1527, which most likely was the first introduction of Anabaptist ideas in the area. Another visit through the area in 1529 reinforced these ideas, but he was captured and burned at the stake in Klausen on September 6, 1529.

Jacob Hutter was one of the early converts in South Tyrol and later became a leader among the Hutterites, who received their name from him. Hutter made several trips between Moravia and Tyrol, and most of the Anabaptists in South Tyrol ended up emigrating to Moravia because of the fierce persecution unleashed by Ferdinand I. In November 1535, Hutter was captured near Klausen and taken to Innsbruck where he was burned at the stake on February 25, 1536. By 1540 Anabaptism in South Tyrol was dying out, largely because of the emigration to Moravia of the converts because of incessant persecution.

=== Low Countries and northern Germany ===
Menno Simons

Melchior Hoffman is credited with the introduction of Anabaptist ideas into the Low Countries. Hoffman had picked up Lutheran and Reformed ideas, but on April 23, 1530, he was "re-baptized" at Strasbourg and within two months had gone to Emden and baptized about 300 persons. For several years Hoffman preached in the Low Countries until he was arrested and imprisoned at Strasbourg, where he died about 10 years later. Hoffman's apocalyptic ideas were indirectly related to the Münster rebellion, even though he was "of a different spirit".

Obbe and Dirk Philips had been baptized by disciples of Jan Matthijs but were opposed to the violence that occurred at Münster. Obbe later became disillusioned with Anabaptism and withdrew from the movement in about 1540, but not before ordaining David Joris, his brother Dirk, and Menno Simons. Joris and Simons parted ways, with Joris placing more emphasis on "spirit and prophecy", while Menno emphasized the authority of the Bible. For the Mennonite side, the emphasis on the "inner" and "spiritual" permitted compromise to "escape persecution", while to the Joris side, the Mennonites were under the "dead letter of the Scripture".

Because of expansion, some of the Low Country Mennonites emigrated to the Vistula delta, a region settled by Germans but under Polish rule until it became part of Prussia in 1772. There they formed the Vistula delta Mennonites, integrating some other Mennonites mainly from northern Germany. In the late 18th century, several thousand of them migrated from there to Ukraine (which at the time was part of Russia), forming the so-called Russian Mennonites. Beginning in 1874, many of them emigrated to the prairie states and provinces of the United States and Canada. In the 1920s, the conservative faction of the Canadian settlers went to Mexico and Paraguay. Beginning in the 1950s, the most conservative of them started to migrate to Bolivia. In 1958, Mexican Mennonites migrated to Belize. Since the 1980s, traditional Russian Mennonites migrated to Argentina. Smaller groups went to Brazil and Uruguay. In 2015, some Mennonites from Bolivia settled in Peru. In 2018, there were more than 200,000 of them living in colonies in Central and South America.

=== Moravia, Bohemia and Silesia ===
Although Moravian Anabaptism was a transplant from other areas of Europe, Moravia soon became a center for the growing movement, largely because of the greater religious tolerance found there. Hans Hut was an early evangelist in the area, with one historian crediting him with baptizing more converts in two years than all the other Anabaptist evangelists put together. The coming of Balthasar Hübmaier to Nikolsburg was a definite boost for Anabaptist ideas to the area. With the great influx of religious refugees from all over Europe, many variations of Anabaptism appeared in Moravia, with Jarold Zeman documenting at least ten slightly different versions.

Jacob Wiedemann appeared at Nikolsburg and began to teach the pacifistic convictions of the Swiss Brethren, on which Hübmaier had been less authoritative. This would lead to a division between the Schwertler (sword-bearing) and the Stäbler (staff-bearing). Wiedemann and those with him also promoted the practice of community of goods. With orders from the lords of Liechtenstein to leave Nikolsburg, about 200 Stäbler withdrew to Moravia to form a community at Austerlitz.

Persecution in South Tyrol brought many refugees to Moravia, many of whom formed into communities that practised community of goods. Others came from Silesia, Switzerland, German lands, and the Low Countries. With the passing of time and persecution, all the other versions of Anabaptism would die out in Moravia leaving only the Hutterites. Even the Hutterites would be dissipated by persecution, with a remnant fleeing to Transylvania, then to Ukraine, and finally to North America in 1874.

=== South and central Germany, Austria and Alsace ===
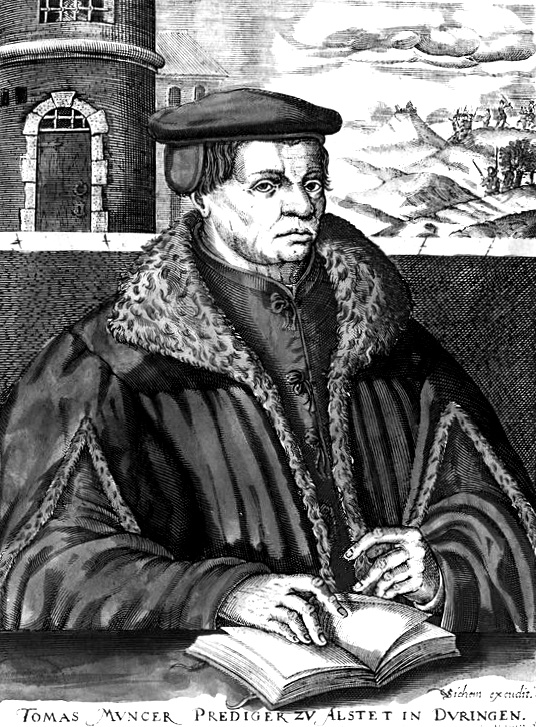
Thomas Müntzer led the German peasants against the landowners.

South German Anabaptism had its roots in German mysticism. Andreas Karlstadt, who first worked alongside Martin Luther, is seen as a forerunner of South German Anabaptism because of his reforming theology that rejected many Catholic practices, including infant baptism. However, Karlstadt is neither known to have been "rebaptized", nor to have taught it. Hans Denck and Hans Hut, both with German mystical background (in connection with Thomas Müntzer) both accepted "rebaptism", but Denck eventually backed off from the idea under pressure. Hut is said to have brought more people into early Anabaptism than all the other Anabaptist evangelists of his time put together.

However, there may have been confusion about what his baptism (at least some of the times it was done by making the sign of the Tau on the forehead) may have meant to the recipient. Some seem to have taken it as a sign by which they would escape the apocalyptical revenge of the Turks that Hut predicted. Hut even went so far as to predict a 1528 coming of the kingdom of God. When the prediction failed, some of his converts became discouraged and left the Anabaptist movement. The large congregation of Anabaptists at Augsburg fell apart (partly because of persecution) and those who stayed with Anabaptist ideas were absorbed into Swiss and Moravian Anabaptist congregations. Pilgram Marpeck was another notable leader in early South German Anabaptism who attempted to steer between the two extremes of Denck's inner Holiness and the legalistic standards of the other Anabaptists.

=== Persecutions and migrations ===
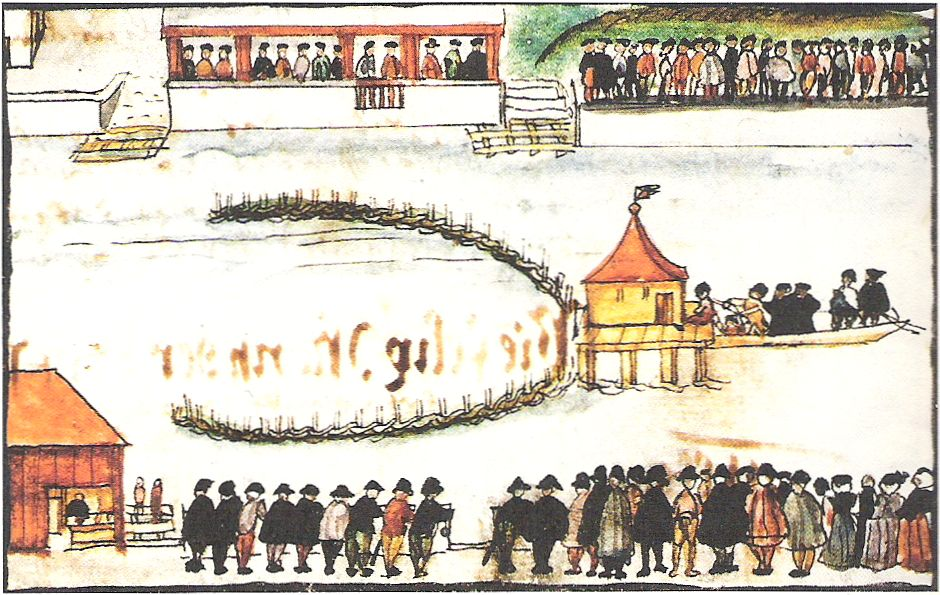
Felix Manz was executed by drowning within two years of his rebaptism.

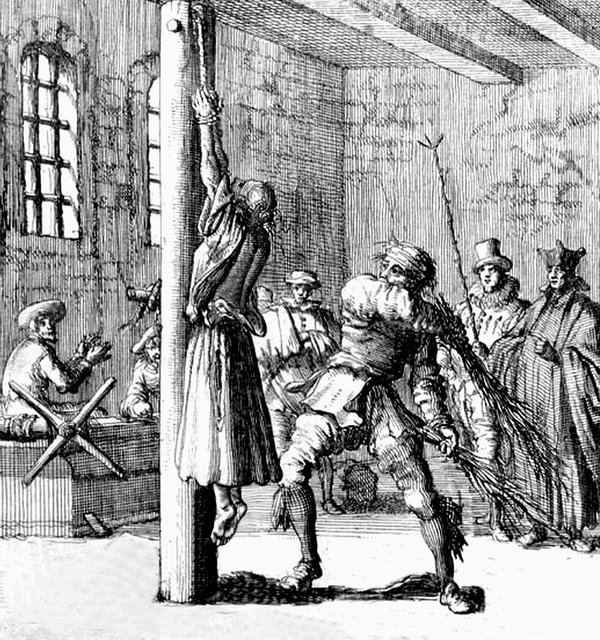
Birching of Anabaptist martyr Ursula in Maastricht, 1570; engraving by Jan Luyken from Martyrs Mirror

Roman Catholics and Protestants alike persecuted the Anabaptists, resorting to torture and execution in attempts to curb the growth of the movement. The Protestants under Zwingli were the first to persecute the Anabaptists, with Manz becoming the first Anabaptist martyr in 1527. On May 20 or 21, 1527, Roman Catholic authorities executed Michael Sattler. King Ferdinand declared drowning (called the third baptism) "the best antidote to Anabaptism". The Tudor regime, even the Protestant monarchs (Edward VI of England and Elizabeth I of England), persecuted Anabaptists as they were deemed too radical and therefore a danger to religious stability.

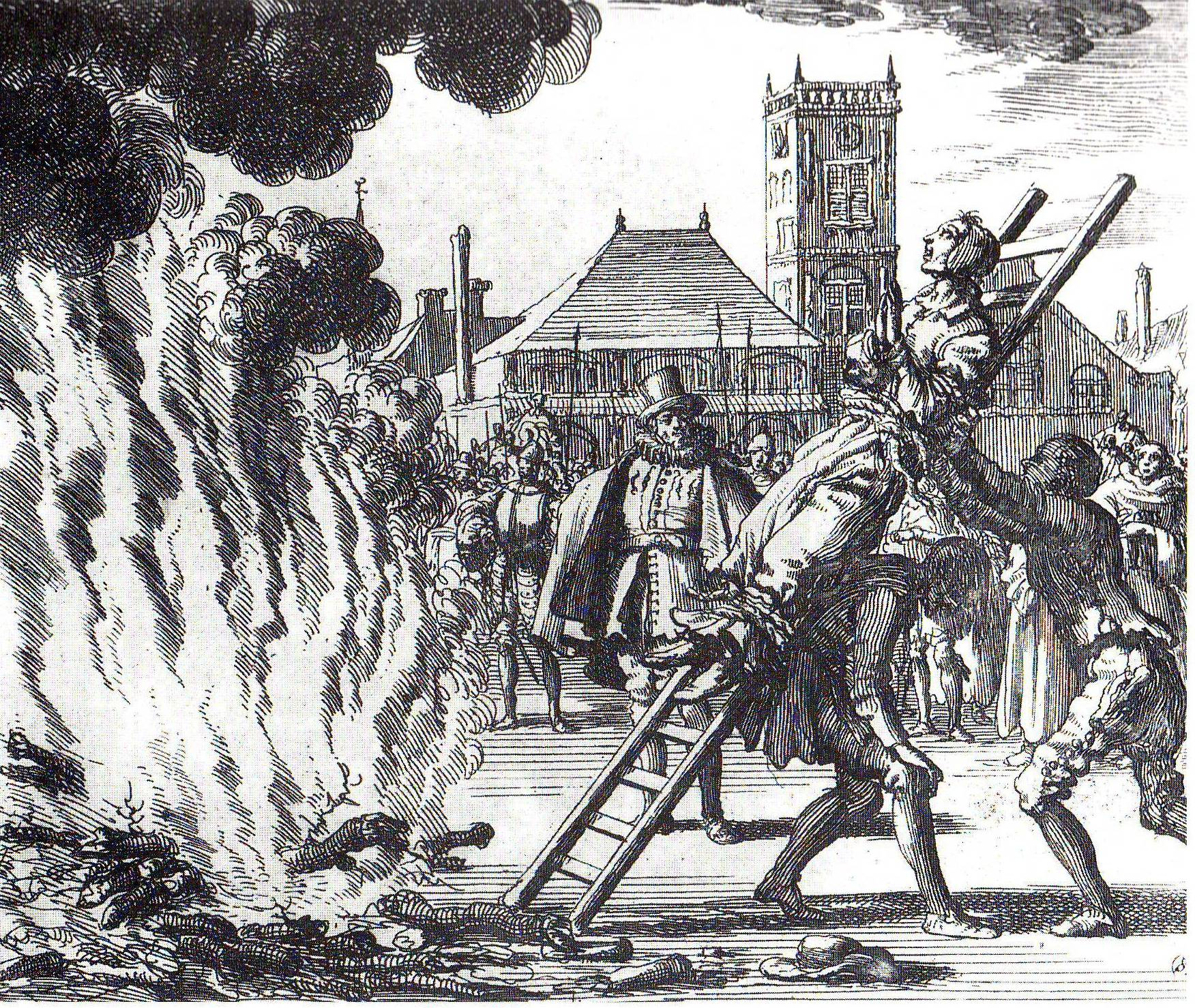
The burning of a 16th-century Dutch Anabaptist, Anneken Hendriks, who was charged with heresy

The persecution of Anabaptists was condoned by the ancient laws of Theodosius I and Justinian I which were passed against the Donatists, and decreed the death penalty for anyone who practised rebaptism. Martyrs Mirror, by Thieleman J. van Braght, describes the persecution and execution of thousands of Anabaptists in various parts of Europe between 1525 and 1660. Continuing persecution in Europe was largely responsible for the mass emigrations to North America by the Amish, Hutterites, and Mennonites. Unlike Calvinists, Anabaptists failed to gain recognition in the Peace of Westphalia of 1648, and as a result they continued to be persecuted in Europe long after that treaty was signed.

Anabaptism stands out among other groups of martyrs, in that Anabaptist martyrologies feature women more prominently, "making up thirty per cent of the martyr stories, compared to five to ten per cent in the other accounts."

== Beliefs and practices ==
Anabaptists view themselves as a separate branch of Christianity, not being a part of Catholicism, Protestantism, Oriental Orthodoxy or Eastern Orthodoxy. (Note: According to the Martyrs Mirror, the Anabaptist movement has existed since the times of the apostles. It is not Protestant, according to this vital publication.) Anabaptist beliefs were codified in the Schleitheim Confession in 1527, which best represents the beliefs of the various denominations of Anabaptism (inclusive of Mennonites, Amish, Hutterites, Bruderhof, Schwarzenau Brethren, River Brethren and Apostolic Christians).

Anabaptist denominations, such as the Mennonites, teach "true faith entails a new birth, a spiritual regeneration by God's grace and power; 'believers' are those who have become the spiritual children of God." In Anabaptist theology, the pathway to salvation is "marked not by a forensic understanding of salvation by 'faith alone', but by the entire process of repentance, self-denial, faith rebirth, the heart having new love, which led to obedience." Those who wish to tarry this path receive baptism after the New Birth. Anabaptists heavily emphasize the importance of obedience in the salvation journey of a believer.

As a whole, Anabaptists emphasize an adherence to the beliefs of early Christianity and are thus distinguished by their keeping of practices that often include the observance of feetwashing, the holy kiss, and communion (with these three ordinances being practiced collectively in the lovefeast in the Schwarzenau Brethren and River Brethren traditions), Christian headcovering, nonconformity to the world, nonresistance, forgiveness, and sharing possessions, which in certain communities (as with the Bruderhof) takes on the form of communal living.

== Types ==
Different types exist among the Anabaptists, although the categorizations tend to vary with the scholar's viewpoint on origins. Estep claims that in order to understand Anabaptism, one must "distinguish between the Anabaptists, inspirationists, and rationalists". He classes the likes of Blaurock, Grebel, Hubmaier, Manz, Marpeck, and Simons as Anabaptists. He groups Müntzer and Storch as inspirationists, and anti-trinitarians such as Michael Servetus, Juan de Valdés, Sebastian Castellio, and Faustus Socinus as rationalists. Mark S. Ritchie follows this line of thought, saying, "The Anabaptists were one of several branches of 'Radical' reformers (i.e. reformers that went further than the mainstream Reformers) to arise out of the Renaissance and Reformation. Two other branches were Spirituals or Inspirationists, who believed that they had received direct revelation from the Spirit, and rationalists or anti-Trinitarians, who rebelled against traditional Christian doctrine, like Michael Servetus."

Those of the polygenesis viewpoint use Anabaptist to define the larger movement and include the inspirationists and rationalists as true Anabaptists. James M. Stayer used the term Anabaptist for those who rebaptized persons already "baptized" in infancy. Walter Klaassen was perhaps the first Mennonite scholar to define Anabaptists that way in his 1960 Oxford dissertation. This represents a rejection of the previous standard held by Mennonite scholars such as Bender and Friedmann.

Another method of categorization acknowledges regional variations, such as Swiss Brethren (Grebel, Manz), Dutch and Frisian Anabaptism (Menno Simons, Dirk Philips), and South German Anabaptism (Hübmaier, Marpeck). Historians and sociologists have made further distinctions between radical Anabaptists, who were prepared to use violence in their attempts to build a New Jerusalem, and their pacifist brethren, later broadly known as Mennonites. Radical Anabaptist groups included the Münsterites and the Batenburgers, who persisted in various guises as late as the 1570s.

== Spirituality ==
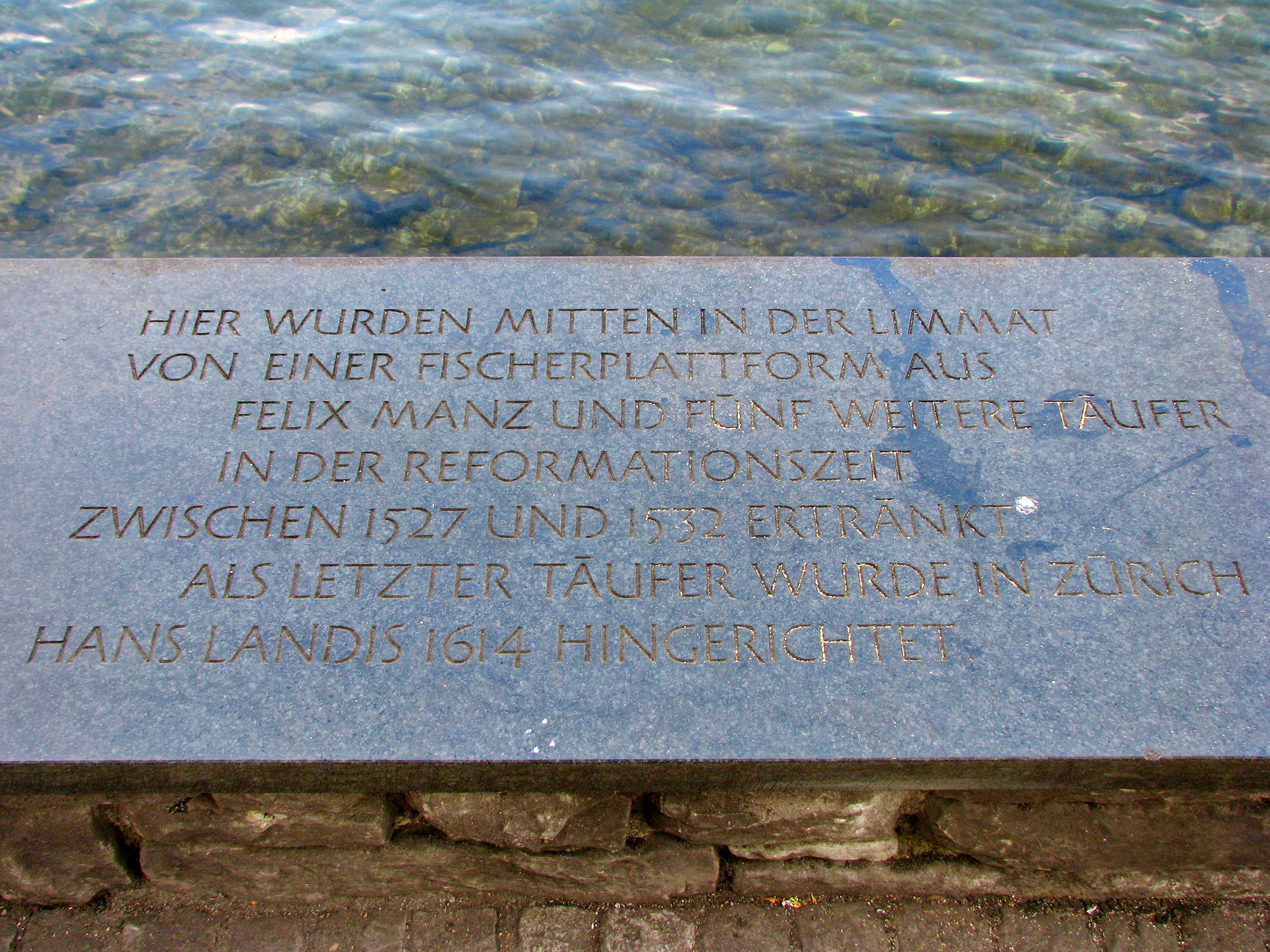
Memorial plate at Schipfe quarter in Zürich for the Anabaptists executed in the early 16th century by the Zürich city government

=== Charismatic manifestations ===
Within the inspirationist wing of the Anabaptist movement, it was not unusual for charismatic manifestations to appear, such as dancing, falling under the power of the Holy Spirit, "prophetic processions" (at Zurich in 1525, at Munster in 1534 and at Amsterdam in 1535), and speaking in tongues. In Germany some Anabaptists, "excited by mass hypnosis, experienced healings, glossolalia, contortions and other manifestations of a camp-meeting revival". The Anabaptist congregations that later developed into the Mennonite and Hutterite churches tended not to promote these manifestations but did not totally reject the miraculous.

Marpeck, for example, wrote against the exclusion of miracles: "Nor does Scripture assert this exclusion ... God has a free hand even in these last days." Referring to some who had been raised from the dead, he wrote: "Many of them have remained constant, enduring tortures inflicted by sword, rope, fire and water and suffering terrible, tyrannical, unheard-of deaths and martyrdoms, all of which they could easily have avoided by recantation. Moreover one also marvels when he sees how the faithful God (Who, after all, overflows with goodness) raises from the dead several such brothers and sisters of Christ after they were hanged, drowned, or killed in other ways. Even today, they are found alive and we can hear their own testimony ... Cannot everyone who sees, even the blind, say with a good conscience that such things are a powerful, unusual, and miraculous act of God? Those who would deny it must be hardened men." The Hutterite Chronicle and the Martyrs Mirror record several accounts of miraculous events, such as when a man named Martin prophesied while being led across a bridge to his execution in 1531: "this once yet the pious are led over this bridge, but no more hereafter". Just "a short time afterwards such a violent storm and flood came that the bridge was demolished".

=== Holy Spirit leadership ===
The Anabaptists insisted upon the "free course" of the Holy Spirit in worship, yet still maintained it all must be judged according to the Scriptures. The Swiss Anabaptist document titled "Answer of Some Who Are Called (Ana-)Baptists – Why They Do Not Attend the Churches". One reason given for not attending the state churches was that these institutions forbade the congregation to exercise spiritual gifts according to "the Christian order as taught in the gospel or the Word of God in 1 Corinthians 14". "When such believers come together, 'Everyone of you (note every one) hath a psalm, hath a doctrine, hath a revelation, hath an interpretation', and so on. When someone comes to church and constantly hears only one person speaking, and all the listeners are silent, neither speaking nor prophesying, who can or will regard or confess the same to be a spiritual congregation, or confess according to 1 Corinthians 14 that God is dwelling and operating in them through His Holy Spirit with His gifts, impelling them one after another in the above-mentioned order of speaking and prophesying."

== Today ==
=== Anabaptists ===
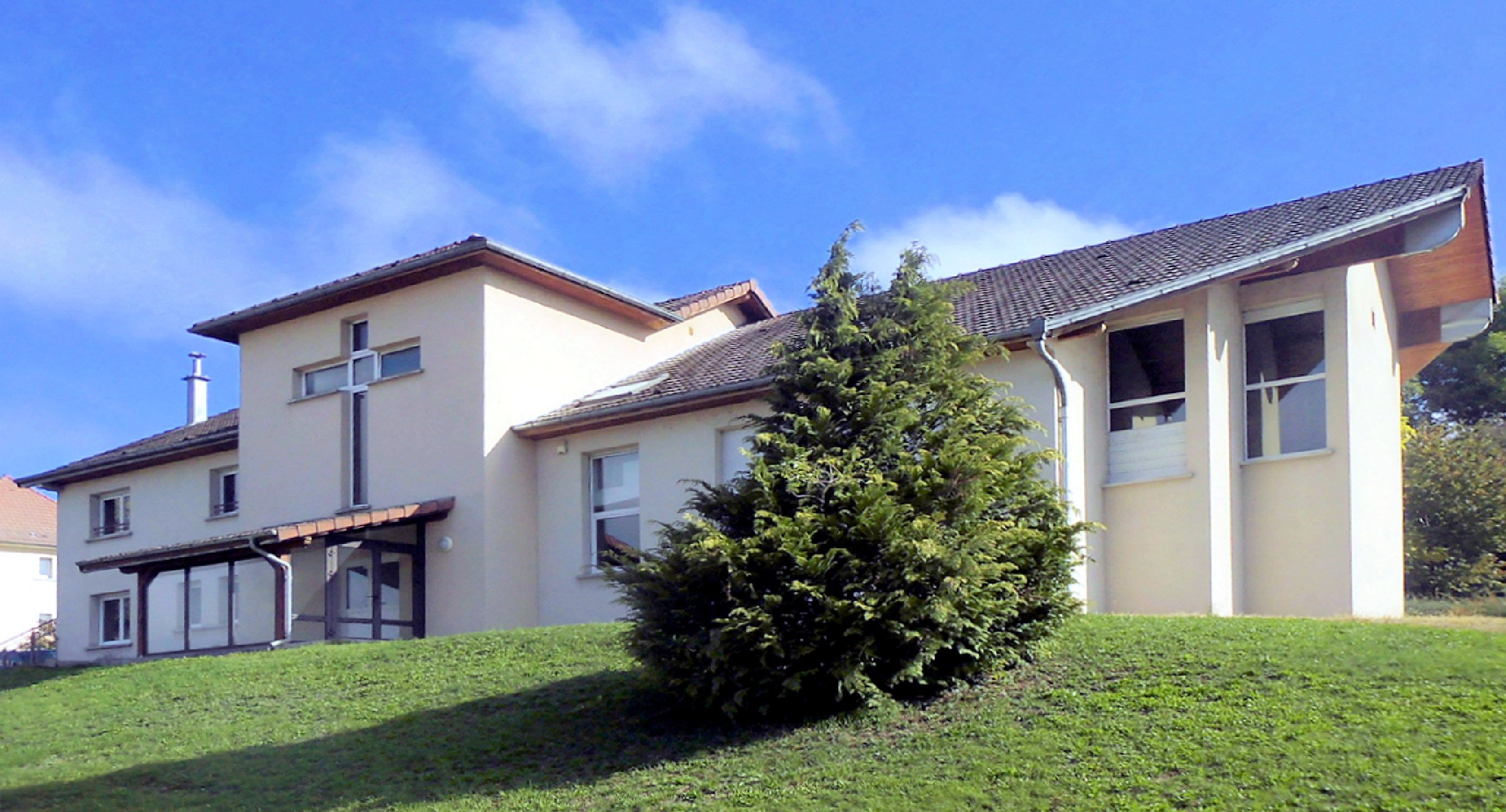
Evangelical Mennonite Church in Altkirch, Association of Evangelical Mennonite Churches of France

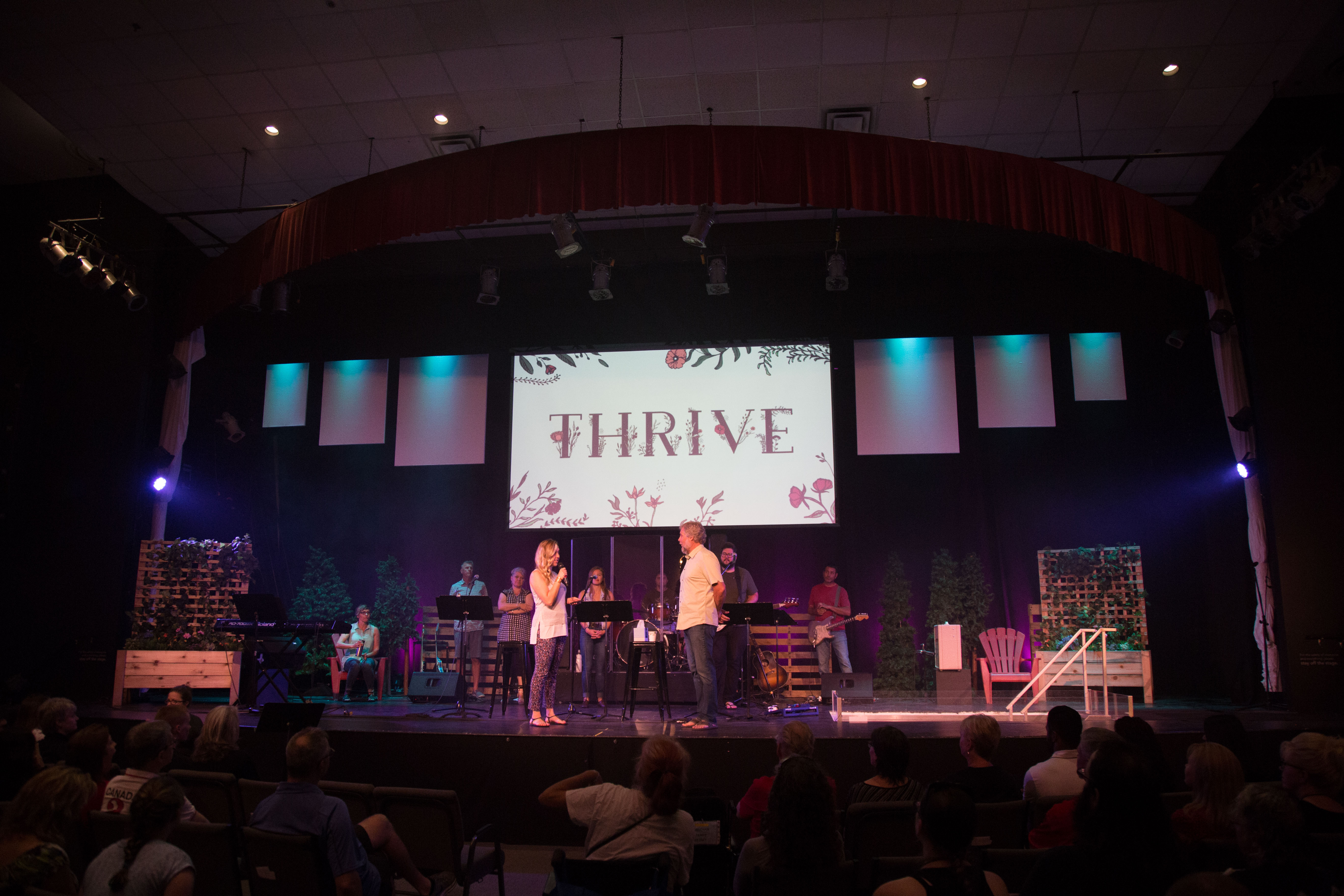
Worship service at The Meeting Place in Winnipeg, Canadian Conference of Mennonite Brethren Churches

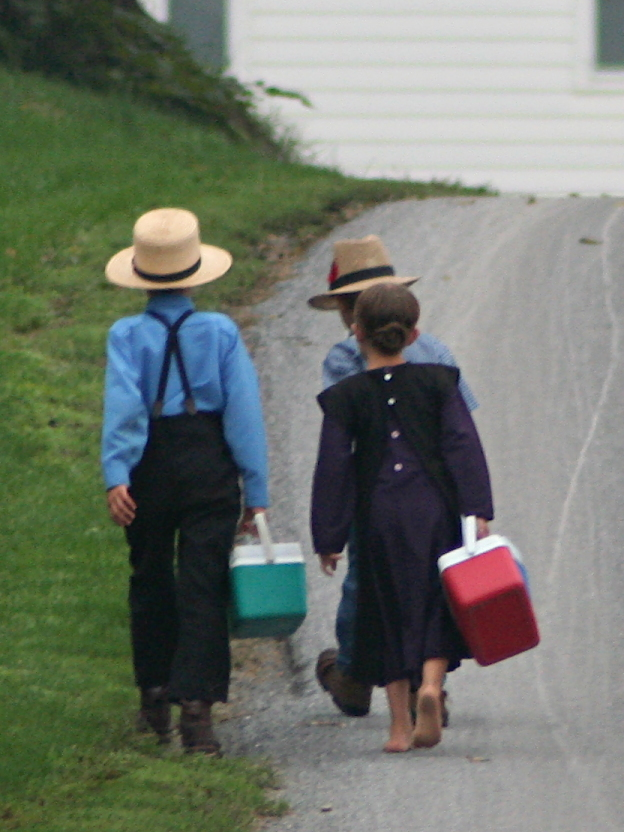
Amish children on their way to school

In 2025, there were over 2.03 million baptized Anabaptists in 87 countries. Over 36% are found in Africa, another 30% in North America, 20% in Asia and the Pacific, 9% in Latin America and the Caribbean, and less than 3% in Europe.

The major branches of Anabaptist Christianity today include the Amish, Schwarzenau Brethren, River Brethren, Hutterites, Mennonites, Apostolic Christian Church, and Bruderhof. Within many of these traditions (Amish, Mennonite, Schwarzenau Brethren and River Brethren) are three subsets: (1) Old Order Anabaptists (2) Conservative Anabaptists and (3) Mainline Anabaptists; for example, among Schwarzenau Brethren are the Old Order German Baptist Brethren (who use horse and buggy for transportation and do not use electricity), the Dunkard Brethren (who adhere to traditional theological beliefs and wear plain dress but use modern conveniences), and the Church of the Brethren (who are largely a mainline group where members are indistinguishable in dress from the general population).

Although many see the more well-known Anabaptist groups (Amish, Hutterites and Mennonites) as ethnic groups, only the Amish and the Hutterites today are composed mainly of descendants of the European Anabaptists, while Mennonites come from diverse backgrounds, with only a minority being classed as ethnic Mennonites. Brethren groups have mostly lost their ethnic distinctiveness.

The Bruderhof Communities were founded in Germany by Eberhard Arnold in 1920, establishing and organisationally joining the Hutterites in 1930. The group moved to England after the Gestapo confiscated their property in 1933, and they subsequently moved to Paraguay in order to avoid military conscription, and after World War II they moved to the United States.

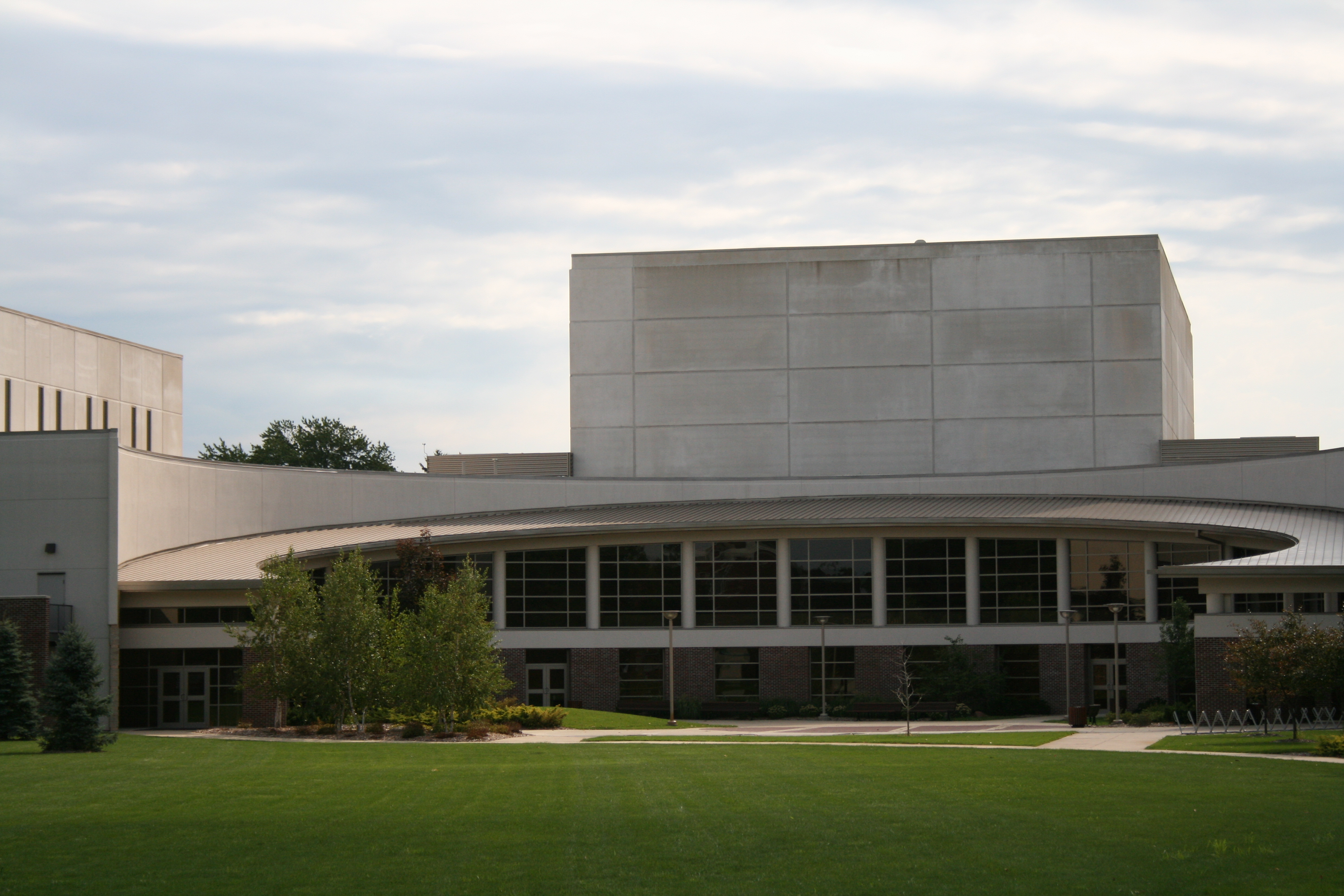
The Goshen College Music Center in Goshen, Indiana, Mennonite Church USA

Groups which are derived from the Schwarzenau Brethren, often called German Baptists, while not directly descended from the 16th-century Radical Reformation, are considered Anabaptist because of their adherence to Anabaptist doctrine. The modern-day Brethren movement is a combination of Anabaptism and Radical Pietism.

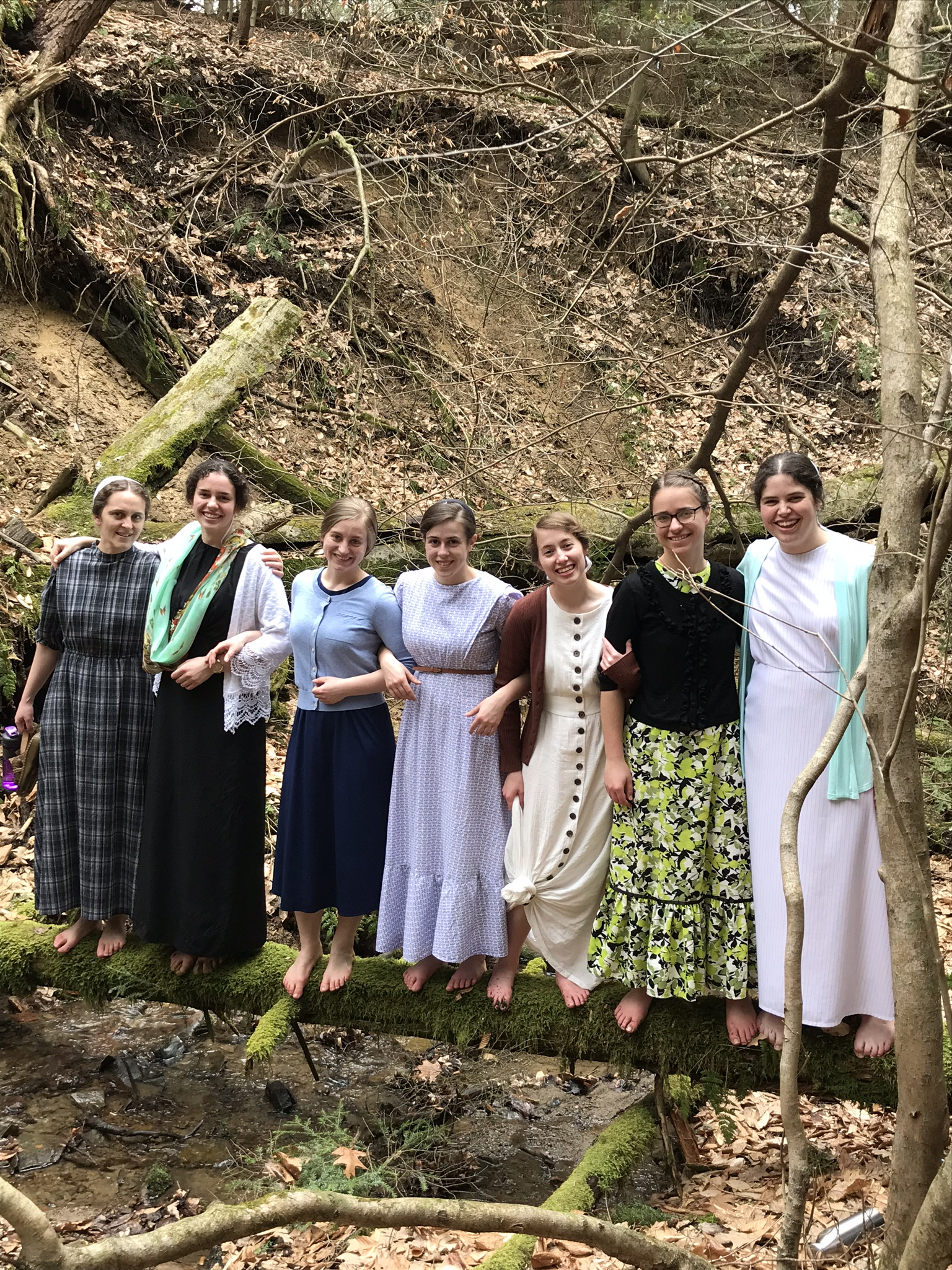
A group of Conservative Anabaptist ladies from various fellowships

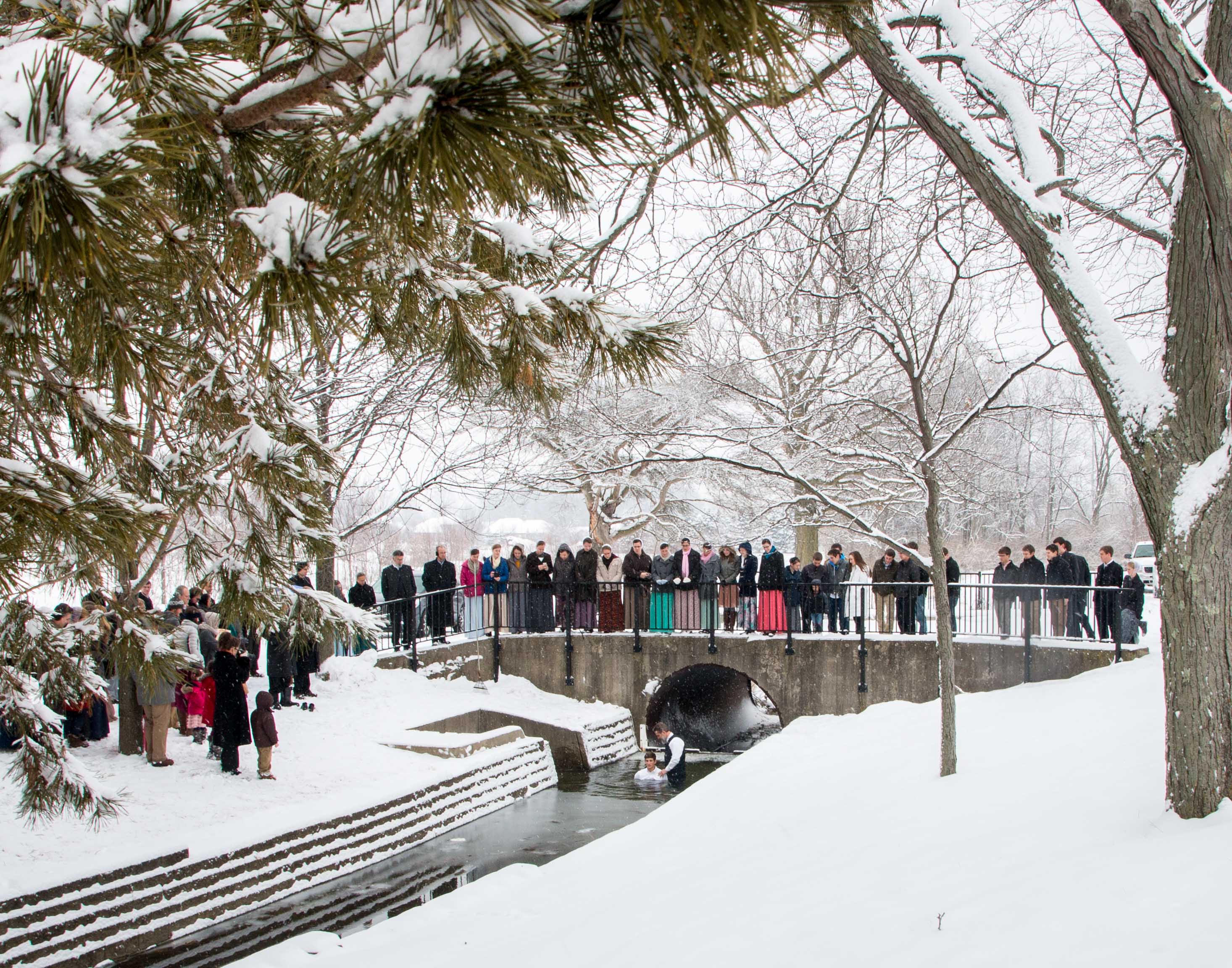
The ordinance of baptism by trine immersion is celebrated by the Salem Congregation of the Old German Baptist Brethren Church, New Conference

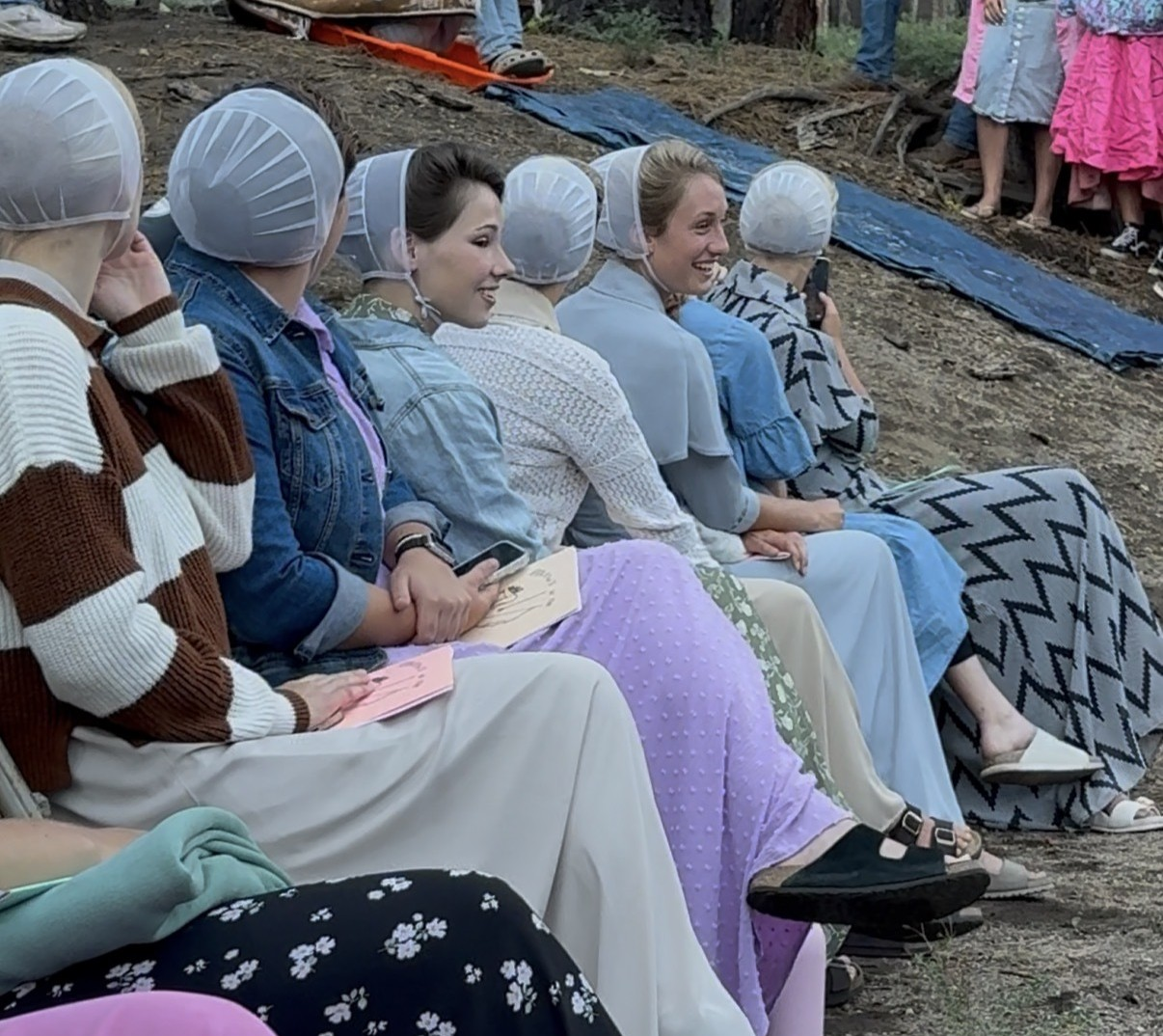
Young ladies of the Old German Baptist Brethren, New Conference, an Anabaptist denomination of the Schwarzenau Brethren tradition, watching a skit at Camp Peaceful Pines in Riverbank, California

=== Neo-Anabaptists ===
Neo-Anabaptism is a late 20th and early 21st century theological movement within American evangelical Christianity which draws inspiration from theologians who are located within the Anabaptist tradition but are ecclesiastically outside it. Neo-Anabaptists have been noted for their "low church, counter-cultural, prophetic-stance-against-empire ethos" as well as for their focus on pacifism, social justice and poverty. The works of Mennonite theologians Ron Sider and John Howard Yoder are frequently cited as having a strong influence on the movement.

=== Relationship with Baptists ===
There are some similarities between Baptists and the Anabaptists, which is why some historians have advocated the view that General Baptists were influenced by Anabaptism. The similarities between these groups include baptism of believers only, religious freedom, similar perspectives on free will, predestination and original sin, along with congregationalism. It is almost certain that the earliest Baptist church led by John Smyth and Thomas Helwys interacted with the Mennonites and that Smyth borrowed ideas from Anabaptism. However, it has been debated if influences from Anabaptism ever found their way to the English General Baptists.

Those who held closer views with the Anabaptists switched to the Mennonite movement along with Smyth, while those who identified as Baptists did so under Helwys who disagreed with Smyth and the Mennonites on multiple issues, denying Melchiorite Christology and Anabaptist views of the civil magistrate. These English General Baptists may have had secondary influences from Anabaptism, although it is a matter of debate among historians. Despite the existing similarities between these two groups, the relationship between Baptists and Anabaptists was strained in 1624 when five existing Baptist churches of London issued a condemnation of the Anabaptists. The theory that Anabaptism influenced Baptist theology has been believed by Philip Schaff, A.C. Underwood, and William R. Estep. Gourley wrote that among some contemporary Baptist scholars who emphasize the faith of the community over soul liberty, the Anabaptist influence theory is making a comeback.

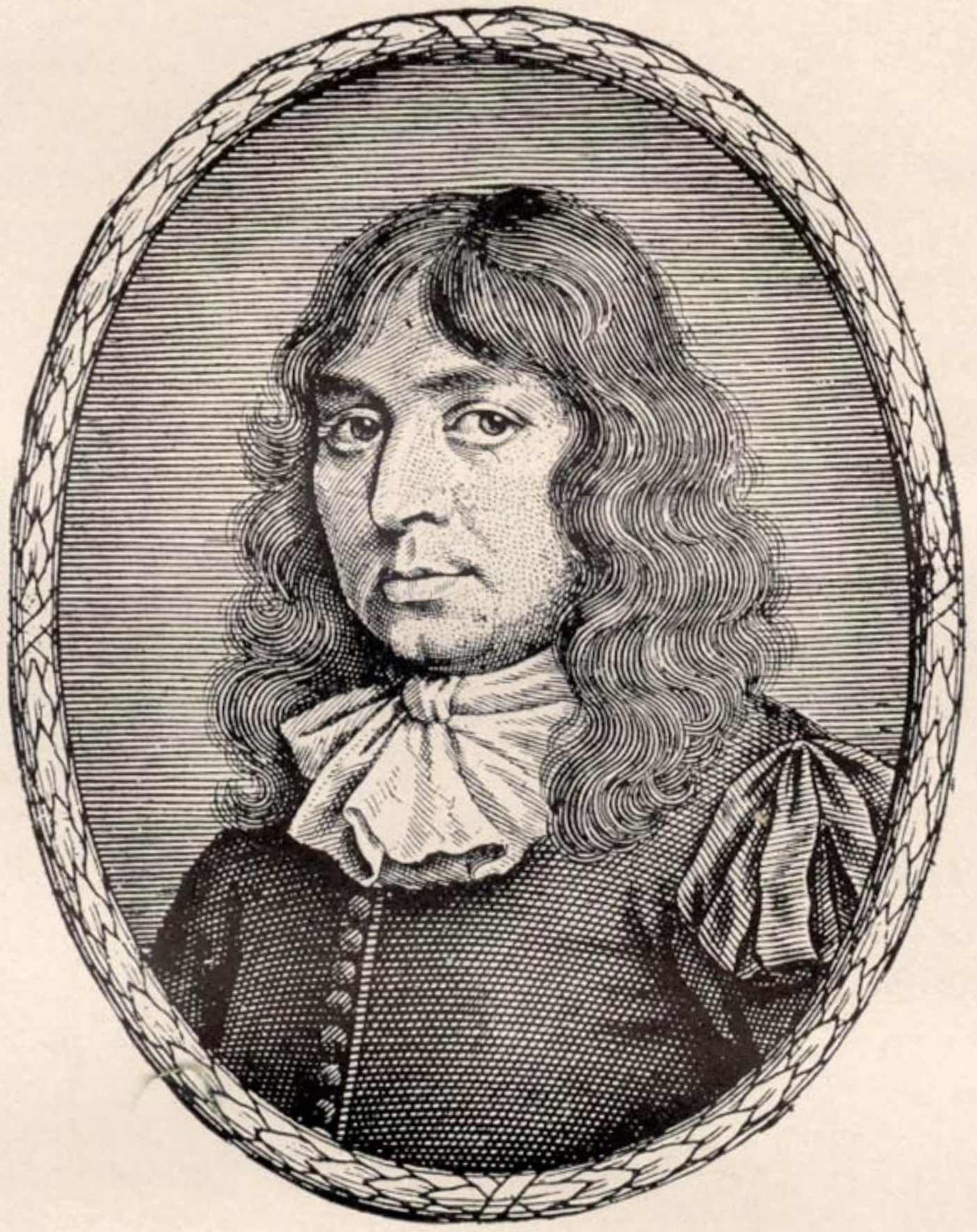
John Smyth

Puritans of England and their Baptist branch arose independently, and although they may have been informed by Anabaptist theology, they clearly differentiate themselves from Anabaptists as seen in the London Confession of Faith 1644, "Of those Churches which are commonly (though falsely) called Anabaptists". Moreover, Baptist historian Chris Traffanstedt maintains that Anabaptists share "some similarities with the early General Baptists, but overall these similarities are slight and not always relational. In the end, we must come to say that this group of Christians does not reflect the historical teaching of the Baptists".

There have been some discussions whether Anabaptist theology influenced Particular Baptists in a limited sense. This theory proposes that there existed a native Anabaptist population in England that may have given rise to ideas held by Particular Baptist theologians. There exists some evidence of there being native English Anabaptists during this time, however many historians have rejected the idea that Anabaptist influences gave rise to the Particular Baptists, and there appears to be no concrete evidence of any Anabaptist influence in Particular Baptists. According to Barrington Raymond White, the relationship between the English Separatists and the Radical Reformers was that of people coming to similar conclusions from their reading of the Bible based on the context of a similar situation.

In practice, Anabaptists have maintained a more literal obedience to the Sermon on the Mount, while Baptists generally do not require nonresistance, non-swearing of oaths, and no remarriage if the first legitimate spouse is living. Traditional Anabaptists also require a head covering for women, modest apparel, practical separation from the world, and plain dress, which most Baptists no longer require. However, some Anabaptists and General Baptists have improved their relations and sometimes have worked together.

== Influence on society ==
Common Anabaptist beliefs and practices of the 16th century continue to influence modern Christianity and Western society.

- Voluntary church membership and believer's baptism
- Freedom of religion – liberty of conscience
- Separation or nonconformity to the world
- Nonresistance, interpreted as pacifism by modernized groups
- Priesthood of all believers

The Anabaptists were early promoters of a free church and freedom of religion. (Note: The origins of religious freedom in the United States are traced back to the Anabaptists.) When it was introduced by the Anabaptists in the 15th and 16th centuries, religious freedom which was independent from the state was unthinkable to both clerical and governmental leaders. Religious liberty was equated with anarchy; Kropotkin traces the birth of anarchist thought in Europe to these early Anabaptist communities.

According to Estep:

Where men believe in the freedom of religion, supported by a guarantee of separation of church and state, they have entered into that heritage. Where men have caught the Anabaptist vision of discipleship, they have become worthy of that heritage. Where corporate discipleship submits itself to the New Testament pattern of the church, the heir has then entered full possession of his legacy.

Anabaptist characters exist in popular culture, most notably Chaplain Tappman in Joseph Heller's novel Catch-22; James (Jacques) in Voltaire's novella Candide; Giacomo Meyerbeer's opera Le prophète (1849); and the central character in the novel Q, by the collective known as "Luther Blissett".

== See also ==
- Adrianists
- Amish Mennonite
- Christian anarchism
- Christian communism
- Christian socialism
- Clancularii
- Conservative Mennonites
- Donatists (first historical occurrence of re-baptism)
- Funkite
- List of Anabaptist churches
- Martyrs Mirror
- Melchior Rink, a central-German Anabaptist leader during the 16th century
- Peace churches
- Plain people
- Restorationism
- Shtundists
- Tabor College
