= Melchior Rink =

German Anabaptist leader

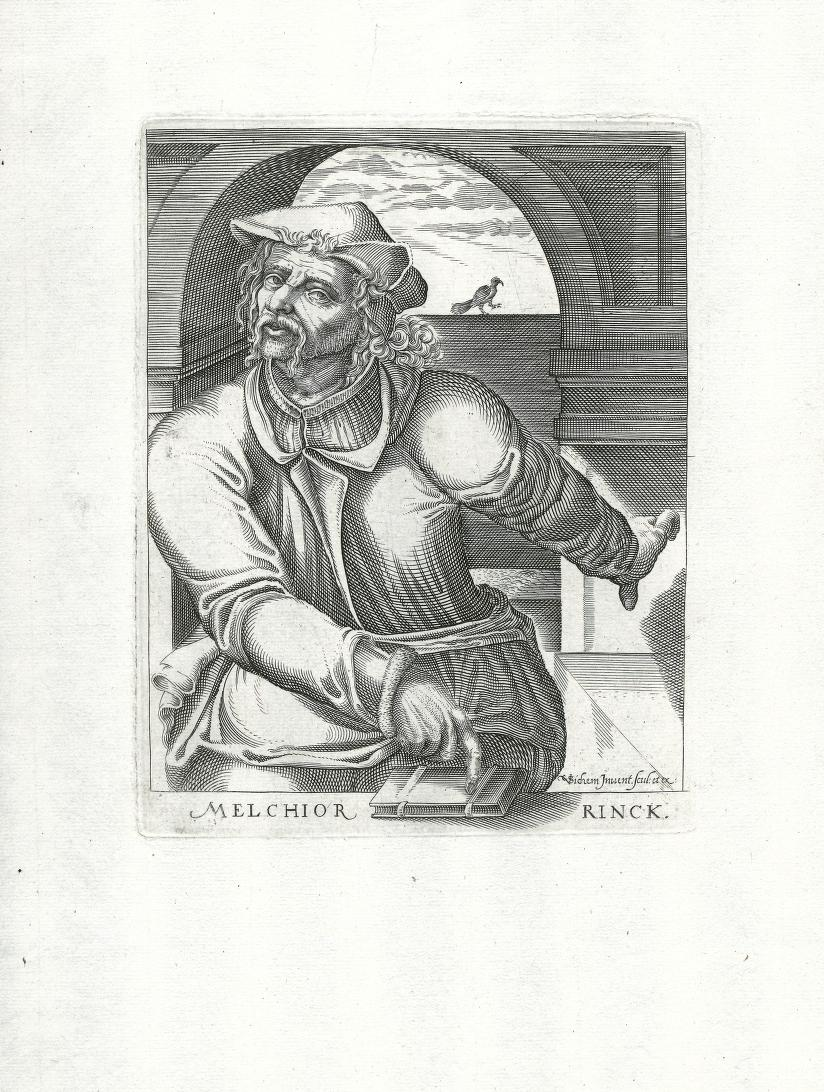
Melchior Rink

Melchior Rink (also Rinck; c. 1493 – c. 1545) was a German Anabaptist leader during the sixteenth-century.

Rink participated in the German Peasants' War of 1525, and was accused by Lutherans of being an instigator of the war, propagating rebaptism, teaching that there should be no civil authority, and encouraging communities to dismiss their magistrates. Rink resented these accusations. According to his own followers, he preached non-resistance to the persecutions the Anabaptists faced, and he asked his followers to obey magistrates so long as they did not demand action against God's law.
