= Neo-Anabaptism =

Christian theological movement

Neo-Anabaptism is a Christian theological movement in the late twentieth and early twenty-first century inspired by classical Anabaptism. According to Stuart Murray, neo-Anabaptists "identify with the Anabaptist tradition and are happy to be known as Anabaptists, but have no historic or cultural links with any Anabaptist-related denomination".

== History and beliefs ==
The sociologist James Davison Hunter and Anabaptist minister Stuart Murray have both written at length on Neo-Anabaptism, describing the movement in books such as To Change the World: The Irony, Tragedy, and Possibility of Christianity in the Late Modern World and The Naked Anabaptist, respectively. Neo-Anabaptism is characterized by being unified but not monolithic; its generally agree on ethics but are denominationally diverse and may differ on many theological points. The unification comes from a general focus on nonviolence and the ethics of the Sermon on the Mount, as opposed to adhering to strict doctrinal creeds or inhabiting the same denomination. The movement has been compared to New Calvinism in that advocates of each movement tend to be part of various denominations, yet are theologically united to some level, finding inspiration from Reformation-era individuals and movements (for instance, John Calvin and Reformed theology for New Calvinism; Anabaptist theologians and their forebears such as Ulrich Zwingli, Menno Simons, and Jacob Hutter for Neo-Anabaptists).

The original Anabaptists were labeled as "Anabaptists" pejoratively, since critics used the term to highlight the movement's perceived obsession with Believer's baptism, or baptism by full-body immersion in water.
