= Carl Adolph Cornelius =

German historian (1819–1903)

Carl Adolf Cornelius
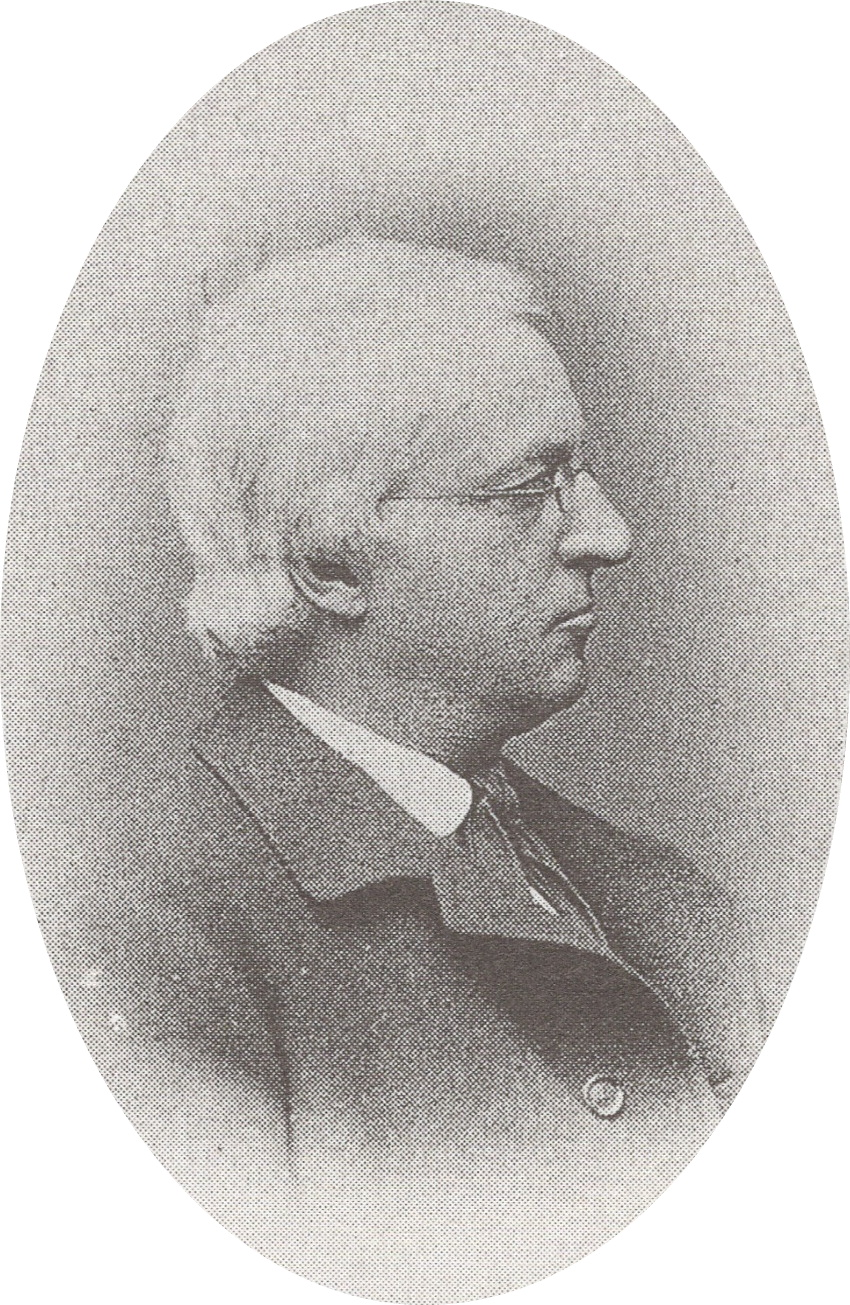
- Carl Adolph Cornelius
- Born: Carl Adolf Wenzeslaus Cornelius; 12 March 1819; Würzburg, Bavaria
- Died: 10 February 1903; Munich, Bavaria
- Education: University of Bonn; Friedrich Wilhelm University of Berlin; University of Münster
- Occupations: Historian; Church historian; Secondary School teacher; University teacher
- Spouse: Elisabeth Simrock (m. 1857)
- Children: Elisabeth (1858–1933); Carl Theodor (1860–1878); Hans (1863–1947)
- Parent(s): Carl Joseph Gerhard Cornelius (1793–1843); Friderike Schwadtke/Cornelius (1789–1867)

Carl Adolf Cornelius (12 March 1819 – 10 February 1903) was a German historian. In the context of the 1848 revolutions he was elected to the Frankfurt Parliament in 1848/49, after which he switched from the schools sector to the universities sector and built a reputation as a church historian.

== Life ==
Carl Adolf Wenzeslaus Cornelius was born in Würzburg, Northern Bavaria. He was his parents' first child. His father, Carl Joseph Gerhard Cornelius (1793–1843), was an actor. His mother, Friderike (born Friderike Schwadtke: 1789–1867), also came from a family of actors. The (subsequently ennobled) artist Peter von Cornelius (1783–1867) was an uncle. The composer Peter Cornelius (1824–1874) was a cousin. His own career choice was influenced by Dr. Theodor Brüggemann, a highly successful secondary school teacher who in 1819 had married his aunt, Elisabeth Cornelius. Carl lived with the Brüggemanns from 1831, and received both career guidance and practical support from his Uncle Theodor.

Cornelius studied history at the University of Bonn and at the Friedrich Wilhelm University of Berlin, where his teachers included von Ranke, Böckh and Karl Lachmann. On leaving university he embarked on a career as a secondary school teacher. He taught successively at schools in Emmerich and Koblenz before moving on again, in 1846, to the Collegium Hosianum, a prestigious Jesuit school in Braunsberg, then in East Prussia.

In 1848, he was elected by his fellow Braunsberg citizens to represent the town at the Frankfurt Parliament, a prototype national legislature which in 1848 was seen as a possible precursor to the national parliament of a newly united liberal Germany. Within the parliament Cornelius became a member of the Casino (cautiously liberal) faction and, when the Casino faction splintered in December 1848, of the conservative-liberal Pariser Hof group that emerged from it. Faced with the opposition of governments, the ambitions of the 1848 revolution failed to gain traction, at least in the immediate term. The Frankfurt Parliament faded away: on 21 May 1849 Cornelius formally resigned from it. He never returned to Braunsberg, his formal resignation from the school there being tendered in early 1850. Instead he now became a "freelance" academic, at this stage without any official teaching contract. Encouraged by his old Berlin tutor, Leopold von Ranke, he turned to the study of the Protestant Reformation. He received a doctorate in 1850 and a higher habilitation qualification from the University of Münster in 1851, opening the way to an academic career.

Sources differ over the precise dates of Cornelius' academic appointments during the next few years, but he probably remained at the University of Münster until 1854, when he took a teaching post as an associate professor at the University of Breslau, moving to the University of Bonn as a full professor in 1855. In 1856, he moved to the Ludwig-Maximilians-Universität München, taking the post of "Catholic Professor", although there was, in reality, nothing particularly ultramontane or "romantic" in his historical writings. During this period, in addition to his teaching responsibilities, he was working on a two-volume history of the Anabaptist Kingdom of Münster, the second volume of which appeared in 1860. He also, in 1857, married Elisabeth Simrock (1829–1907), the daughter of a music publisher.

German unification did not disappear from the political agenda after the disappointments of 1848/49. Initially Cornelius supported the "Großdeutschland" solution which foresaw a united German state that would be administered from Vienna and incorporate those parts of the Austrian empire where German language and culture predominated. This raised various difficult issues because of the multinational multi-ethnic nature of Austro-Hungary, however, and when unification actually took place it was based on a "Kleindeutschland" model, creating a smaller German state, completely excluding Roman Catholic Austria, with much power devolved to the regions, and national control exercised not from Vienna but from Berlin. The process of creating this new German state was deftly choreographed by Chancellor Bismarck: after 1866 Cornelius abandoned his support for "Großdeutschland", becoming a huge admirer of Bismarck's approach to the unification challenge. In the intense disputes involving the Roman Catholic Church that followed German unification Cornelius was a supporter of Ignaz von Döllinger. He supported church reforms and rejected the newly advanced dogma of papal infallibility. He was a leading supporter of what came to be known as the Old Catholic Church.

In 1858, Cornelius became one of the original members of the Historical Commission of the Bavarian Academy of Sciences and Humanities. Here he took responsibility for the so-called Wittelsbach Correspondence, a large archive of political papers of the Bavarian ruling house from the sixteenth and seventeenth centuries. After the departure of Heinrich von Sybel, Cornelius became secretary to the entire commission. He became, in addition, a corresponding member of the Prussian Academy of Sciences and Humanities on 28 October 1897.

In his 70s, Carl Adolf Cornelius undertook his final major academic project, researching and producing various books and other publications on John Calvin.
