= Anabaptist theology =

Theological tradition reflecting the doctrine of the Anabaptist Churches

Anabaptist theology, also known as Anabaptist doctrine, is a theological tradition reflecting the doctrine of the Anabaptist Churches. The major branches of Anabaptist Christianity (inclusive of Mennonites, Amish, Hutterites, Bruderhof, Schwarzenau Brethren, River Brethren and Apostolic Christians) agree on core doctrines but have nuances in practice. Rooted in the 16th-century Radical Reformation, it relies on foundational documents like the Schleitheim Confession and the Dordrecht Confession of Faith. While historically sustained as an implicit, lived theology emphasizing righteous living over abstract systematic theology, a formal academic tradition has also emerged, including influential texts widely used in catechesis.

Central to this tradition is a Christ-centered biblical hermeneutic that translates into a strong emphasis on practical discipleship and yielding to God's will. Soteriologically, Anabaptism affirms human free will, enabling grace, and a transformative understanding of atonement. Its ecclesiology defines the church as a voluntary, disciplined community separated from the state, visibly expressed through believer's baptism, the Lord's Supper and footwashing. Ethically, Anabaptist theology demands nonconformity to the world, characterized by strict church discipline, nonresistance, and traditional practices like plain dress and headcoverings.

== Historical development and confessional sources ==
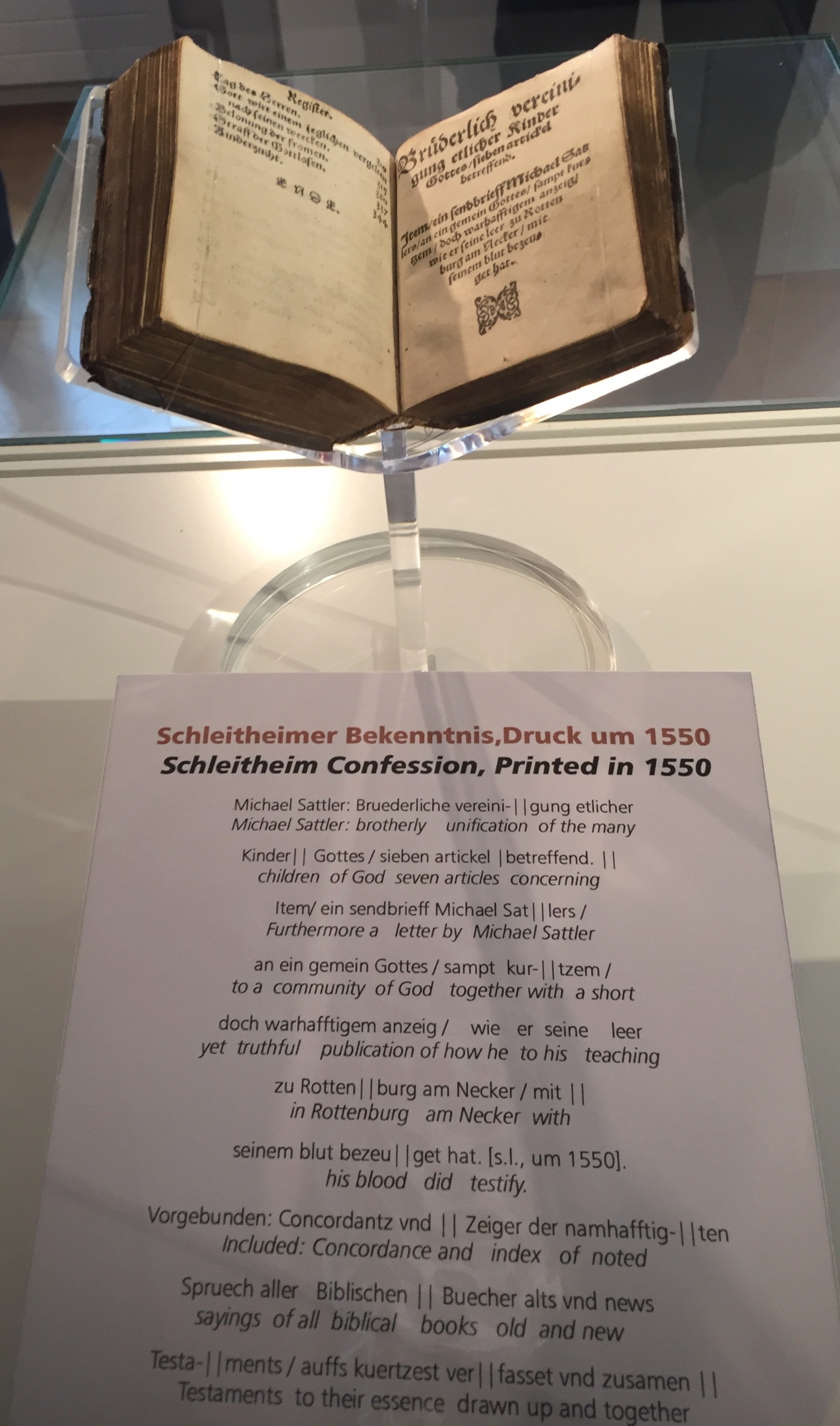
A copy of the Schleitheim Confession, the Anabaptist confession of faith (1527)

Important sources for Anabaptist doctrine are the Schleitheim Confession and the Dordrecht Confession of Faith, both of which have been held by many Anabaptist Churches throughout history. Daniel Kauffman, a bishop of the Mennonite Church, codified Anabaptist beliefs in the influential text Doctrines of the Bible, which continues to be widely used in catechesis.

Anabaptist theology is the expression and communication of theological convictions that have sustained the ordinary life of faith communities. Alongside this ordinary Anabaptist theology, a more formal, academic version has developed. Early on, persecution and a theology of separation from the world meant few Anabaptists had access to higher education, except in the Netherlands where Mennonites established a seminary in 1735. In the 20th century, academic Anabaptist theology began to grow significantly.

John S. Oyer states that the Old Order Amish have an implicit theology that can be found in their biblical hermeneutics, but take little interest in explicit, formal, and systematic theology. It is easier to find out about their implicit theology in talking with them than reading written documents. According to Oyer, their implicit theology is practical, not theoretical. The most important written source of Amish theology, according to Oyer, is "1001 Questions and Answers on the Christian Life".

The Hutterites possess an account of their belief written by Peter Riedemann (Rechenschafft unserer Religion, Leer und Glaubens) and theological tracts and letters by Hans Schlaffer, Leonhard Schiemer and Ambrosius Spittelmaier are extant.

Anabaptist theology is reflected in the prayer and worship of Anabaptists. A Devoted Christian's Prayer Book and Our Fervent Prayers are prayer books that are widely used in the devotional life of Anabaptists.

== Practical discipleship and biblical authority ==
From its inception, Anabaptist practice has sought to emulate early Christianity. A strong theme among Anabaptists has been practical discipleship that turns the believer into a model of righteousness in the here and now. In the 1545 Kempen Confession, the Anabaptist authors stated their desire to seek salvation and the well-being of all. C. Arnold Snyder writes that following Jesus involves yielding to God's will and suffering rather than inflicting it.

Early Anabaptists held a high view of the Bible and insisted on the necessity of it being interpreted with the aid of the living Christ within. Author C. Arnold Snyder describes their view as relying on the Holy Spirit for interpretation, while maintaining a practical approach that challenged the close church-state relationships taken for granted by the Protestant Reformers. Anabaptists hold that the entire Bible is the word of God, while insisting that the New Testament is the rule of faith and practice for the Church. Anabaptists Hans Denck and Ludwig Hätzer were responsible for the first translation of the Old Testament Prophets from Hebrew into the German language.

The Amish tradition of Anabaptist Christianity uses the Luther Bible, which contains the Old Testament, Apocrypha, and New Testament; Amish wedding ceremonies include the retelling of the marriage of Tobias and Sarah in the Apocrypha. The texts regarding the martyrdoms under Antiochus IV in the intertestamental section of the Bible containing 1 Maccabees and 2 Maccabees are held in high esteem by the Anabaptists, who faced persecution in their history.

== Christology ==
Christology addresses the person and work of Jesus Christ, relative to his divinity, humanity, and work of salvation. Anabaptist Christology stresses the significance of Jesus as a moral example for humanity.

Twentieth-century Anabaptist scholars often assumed that sixteenth-century Anabaptist theology was broadly compatible with classical ecumenical creeds, although early leaders expressed their views in distinct ways. South German leader Hans Denck articulated a logos Christology centered on the presence of the inner Word within every person. While Austrian leader Pilgram Marpeck developed novel theological formulations to defend orthodox Chalcedonian understandings of Christ's humanity and divinity, Dutch leaders such as Melchior Hoffman, Menno Simons, and Dirk Philips taught the doctrine of the "celestial flesh." Under this doctrine, Christ's human flesh was conceived by the Holy Spirit from heavenly origin rather than derived from Mary's fallen substance, ensuring that the Savior was uncorrupted by original sin.

== Soteriology ==
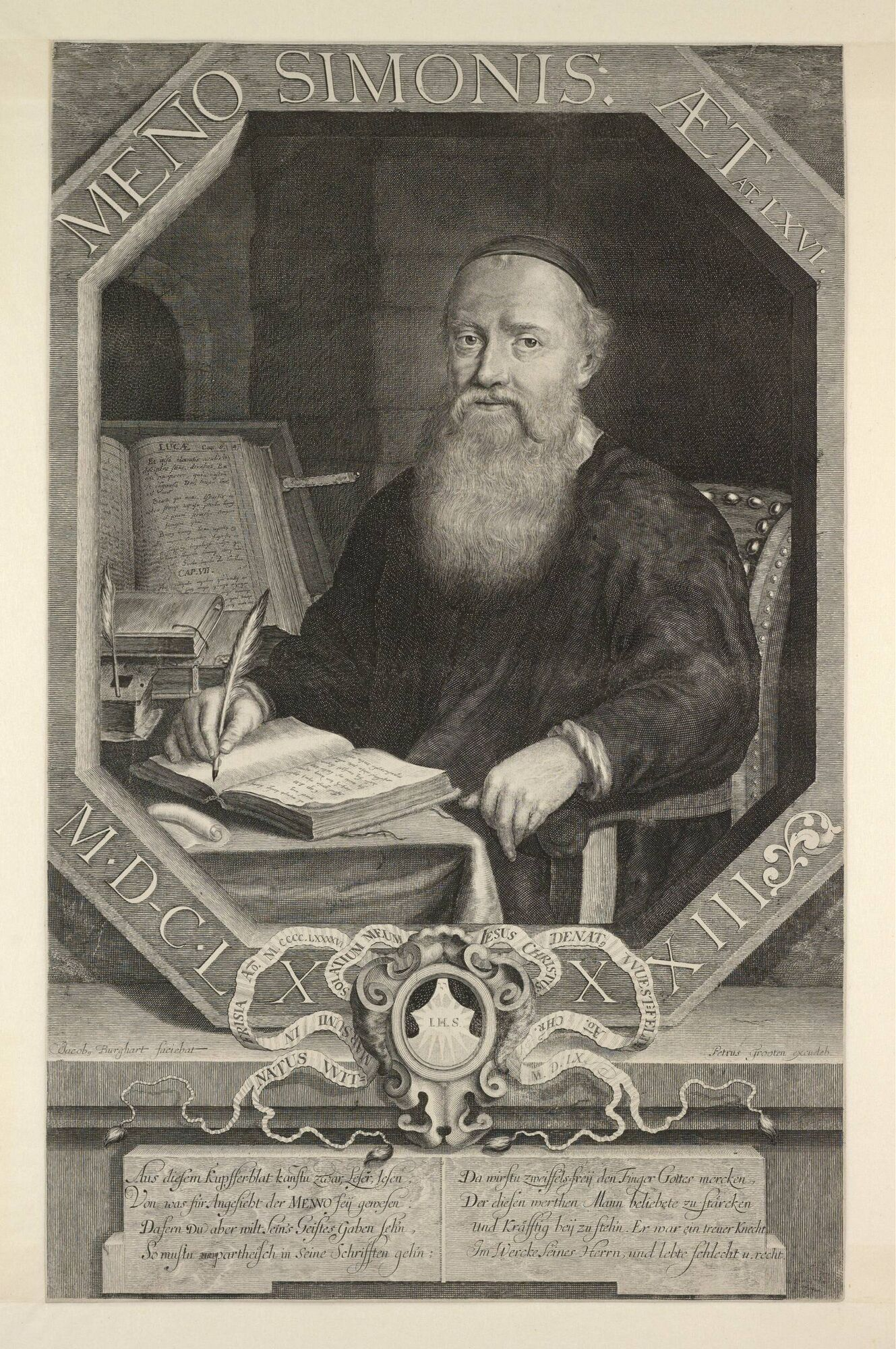
Portrait of Menno Simons, an influential early Anabaptist theologian.

=== Generalities ===
While Anabaptism has a unique conceptualization of soteriology, its soteriological doctrines share similarities with those of Arminianism in certain respects. In particular, Mennonite soteriology has been historically consistent with Arminianism, whereas the doctrines of Calvinist soteriology have been rejected. Moreover, Anabaptism seems to have influenced Jacobus Arminius. At least, he was sympathetic to the Anabaptist point of view, and Anabaptists were commonly in attendance on his preaching.

=== Reconciliation with God ===
The Anabaptist tradition rejected a purely forensic understanding of atonement. While Anabaptists did not deny substitutionary language, they regarded the Anselmian satisfaction model as inadequate, since it reduced atonement to a passive change in humanity's legal status before God, independent of human response. For Pilgram Marpeck, atonement meant "at-one-ment" encompassing Christ's ministry, death, and resurrection as a comprehensive work of reconciliation rather than a legal transaction, while Balthasar Hubmaier held that neither reconciliation nor restoration is efficacious without human cooperation with divine grace. More broadly, Anabaptist understandings of atonement resist reduction to any single model, drawing simultaneously on moral influence, substitutionary, and Christus Victor motifs, a plurality of emphasis that persists in the tradition's contemporary theology. Among present-day Mennonite theologians, J. Denny Weaver and Thomas Finger have each developed the Christus Victor strand into an explicitly nonviolent doctrine of atonement, one they see as rooted in Anabaptism's own history.

=== Human's condition and calling ===
Anabaptist doctrine teaches that God desires all to be saved, inviting everyone to repentance without obstructing human will. The Dunkard Brethren Church, an Anabaptist denomination of the Schwarzenau Brethren tradition, teaches that election enables belief and righteousness through God's mercy.

Early Anabaptist anthropology avoided doctrines of total depravity that claimed the capacity to respond to divine grace had been totally destroyed. Drawing on late medieval mystical thought, Anabaptists maintained that a vestige of the divine image or natural light survived the Fall, enabling human beings to respond when awakened by the Holy Spirit. In his 1526 treatise on theodicy, Hans Denck argued that humans possess genuine moral responsibility to accept or reject the divine call, affirming the reality of human free will enabled by grace.

Historically, certain Anabaptists, like Hut and Marpeck, rejected total depravity. Others shared views akin to Arminians: Hubmaier, Schiemer, and Philips affirmed total depravity and believed in the restoration of human libertarian free will through prevenient grace communicated through the Gospel. Denck and Sattler maintained that God restores human free will through prevenient grace prior to exposure to the Gospel. Schiemer's perspective affirmed total depravity and the restoration of free will through prevenient grace given at birth and later experienced at the age of accountability.

=== Conversion ===
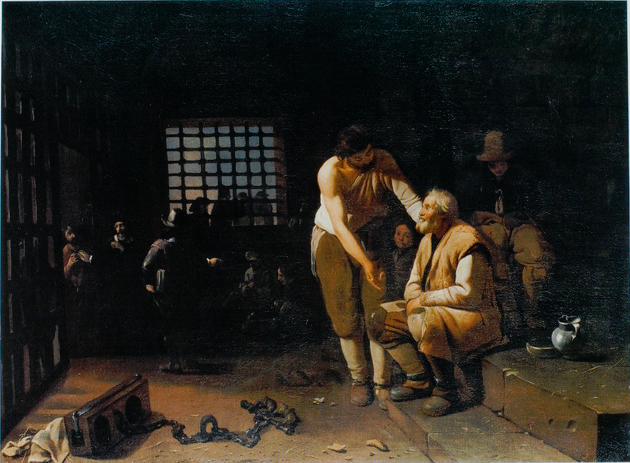
Visiting the Imprisoned by Michiel Sweerts (1649)

Anabaptist doctrine teaches that true faith entails a spiritual rebirth by God's power. The Dunkard Brethren Church, a Conservative Anabaptist denomination in the Schwarzenau Brethren tradition, defines this as a change made in the soul.

The beginning of the Anabaptist path to salvation is marked by the entire process of repentance, self-denial, faith, rebirth, and obedience. In this framework, salvation is conceptualized as an ongoing synergistic process of "enabling grace" and sanctification, wherein inward spiritual transformation is verified by outward holy living within the community. After becoming a believer, Anabaptist theology emphasizes a faith that works. Anabaptist denominations teach salvation by faith through grace, emphasizing that such faith must bear visible fruit in a regenerated life.

Hans Denck wrote that true belief equates to obeying God's Word in absolute confidence. Obedience to Jesus and other New Testament teachings, loving one another and being at peace with others, and walking in holiness are seen as earmarks of the saved. Good works thus have an important role in the life of an Anabaptist believer, with the teaching that faith without works is a dead faith occupying a cornerstone in Anabaptist Christianity. Anabaptists do not teach faith and works, in the sense of two separate entities, are necessary for salvation, but rather that true faith will always produce good works. Balthasar Hubmaier wrote that faith cannot be considered true if it lacks the works of love.

=== Justification ===
Anabaptists dismissed the Lutheran doctrine of justification, labeling it a dead faith that was unable to produce Christian love and good works. Peter Riedemann wrote that so-called Christians who profess to love God while clinging to sinful practices are akin to the heathens who merely learned outward service to God.

Rather than a forensic justification that only gave a legal change of one's status before God, early Anabaptists taught that justification sparked a transformation in which the believer assumed the nature of Christ. Riedemann explained this ontological justification by stating that Christ redeems humanity from sin and dwells within to conquer it.

=== Preservation ===
Anabaptist theology traditionally teaches conditional security. However, in the 20th century, particularly in North America, some Mennonites have adopted the doctrine of eternal security.

=== Loss of the Holy Spirit ===
The majority of Anabaptists have historically believed that a person can lose the Holy Spirit through willful sin and disobedience, as maintaining faith required an ongoing commitment to righteousness.

However, the Lutheran Book of Concord claims that there were certain Anabaptists who taught that it was impossible for someone who had been justified to lose the Holy Spirit. The Concord condemned this view, asserting that those who have received the Holy Ghost may still fall from grace and depart from the divine favor of God.

== Ecclesiology and non-resistance ==
With respect to ecclesiology, Anabaptist theology calls believers to gather in churches to deny worldly flesh and emulate their Master. The Church is viewed as a vessel tasked with leading souls to God, thus providing the faithful with clear guidelines on matters such as modesty.

Anabaptist ecclesiology is structured around four primary marks: believers' baptism, the ban (church discipline), the Lord's Supper, and mutual aid or the community of goods. Rooted in this ecclesiology is a radical "two kingdoms" theology that sharply distinguishes the church as the body of Christ from the fallen world governed by political coercion and the sword. While Swiss Anabaptism maintained a strict dualistic separation from civic governance, Dutch Mennonites developed a softer dualism that allowed for constructive engagement with society and defended the legitimacy of defensive civil governance.

=== Non-resistance ===
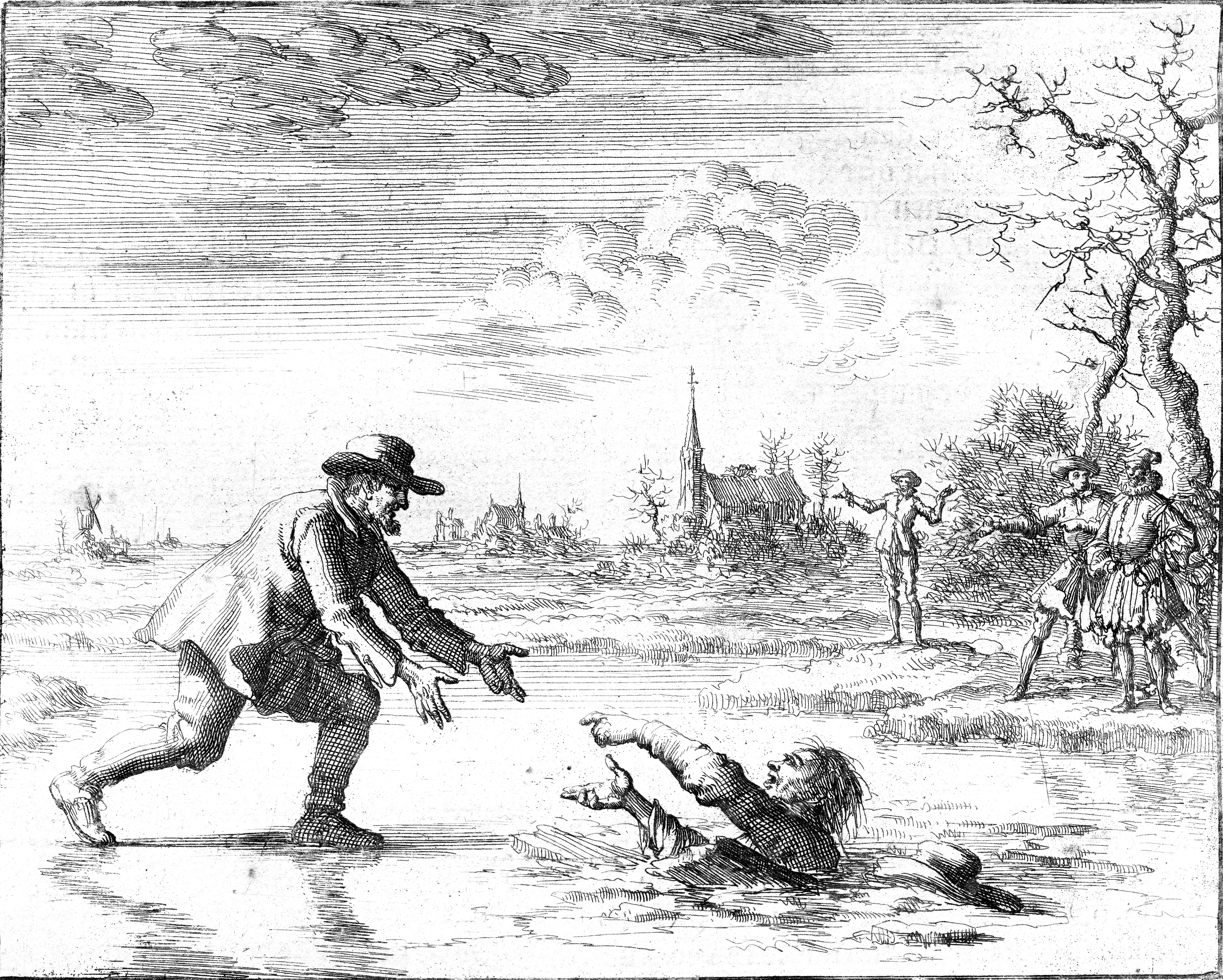
An engraving by Jan Luyken depicting Dirk Willems rescuing his pursuer, demonstrating Anabaptist nonresistance.

Most Anabaptist hold that violence is wrong, as is supporting violence though personal actions such as joining the military. This would also include opposition to abortion and capital punishment. Conservative Anabaptist denominations, such as the Dunkard Brethren Church, teach that scriptural directives strictly forbid warfare and mandate loving one's enemies.

In 1918, three Hutterite brothers, David, Joseph, and Michael Hofer, and Joseph's brother-in-law Jacob Wipf were imprisoned on Alcatraz for refusal to join the US military. Two of them, Joseph and Michael Hofer, died in late 1918 shortly after their transfer to a prison at Fort Leavenworth, Kansas. The Bruderhof is another Anabaptist church that is strongly pacifist, believing that personal property is a form of injustice.

According to Harold S. Bender and several of his colleagues, the Anabaptists advocated for voluntary religious choice, a church free from state influence, and a nonresistant disciple's life.

Schwertler Anabaptists, such as Balthasar Hubmaier, were not nonresistant and supported the government; they even encouraged involvement in government. In light of this, they were not accepted by the mainstream of the Anabaptists as being true adherents of the faith.

=== Forgiveness ===
Anabaptist doctrine stresses practicing forgiveness. For example, in instances where drivers of automobiles get into accidents with horse-drawn buggies resulting in the deaths of Old Order Amish people, among other situations, their families forgive the perpetrator. In cases of accidents, Old Order Amish often are contacted by lawyers who encourage them to file lawsuits; the Old Order Amish reject these overtures as being in conflict with their Christian religious beliefs. Reflecting the principles of peace and nonresistance, Anabaptist religious beliefs do not permit the filing of lawsuits (cf. 1 Corinthians 6:1-8). Representatives of the Old Order Amish community have said that they would rather face financial loss than file a lawsuit.

=== Church discipline ===
The Anabaptists practiced church discipline before any of the Reformers adopted it. Reformer Martin Bucer was influenced by them to introduce discipline into the church in Strassburg, though the attempt was not successful. Bucer convinced John Calvin of the idea, and he established church discipline in Geneva. Calvin read the Schleitheim Confession in 1544 and concluded that these believers had correctly gleaned certain teachings from Protestantism, though Calvin was only 18 years old and still a Catholic when the Schleitheim Confession was formed in 1527.

== Christian ordinances ==
The Anabaptist view of the ordinances is generally one of being a remembrance, or a exterior sign/symbol of inward spiritual realities. This view can be summed up with the following statement taken from the 1577 Waterlander Confession which outlines that ordinances are visible signs pointing to divine grace. These exterior ordinances, when practiced in conjunction with the inward realities, bring believers into conformity with Christ, altering humanity to act in loving obedience.

In Anabaptist churches of the Conservative Mennonite tradition, seven ordinances are taught, including baptism, the Lord's Supper, feetwashing, marriage, anointing with oil, the holy kiss, and the veiling of women. Within the Anabaptist churches of the Schwarzenau Brethren tradition and the River Brethren tradition, the Lovefeast is observed, which includes the ordinances of the holy kiss, footwashing and communion, in addition to the sharing of a communal meal.

=== Baptism ===
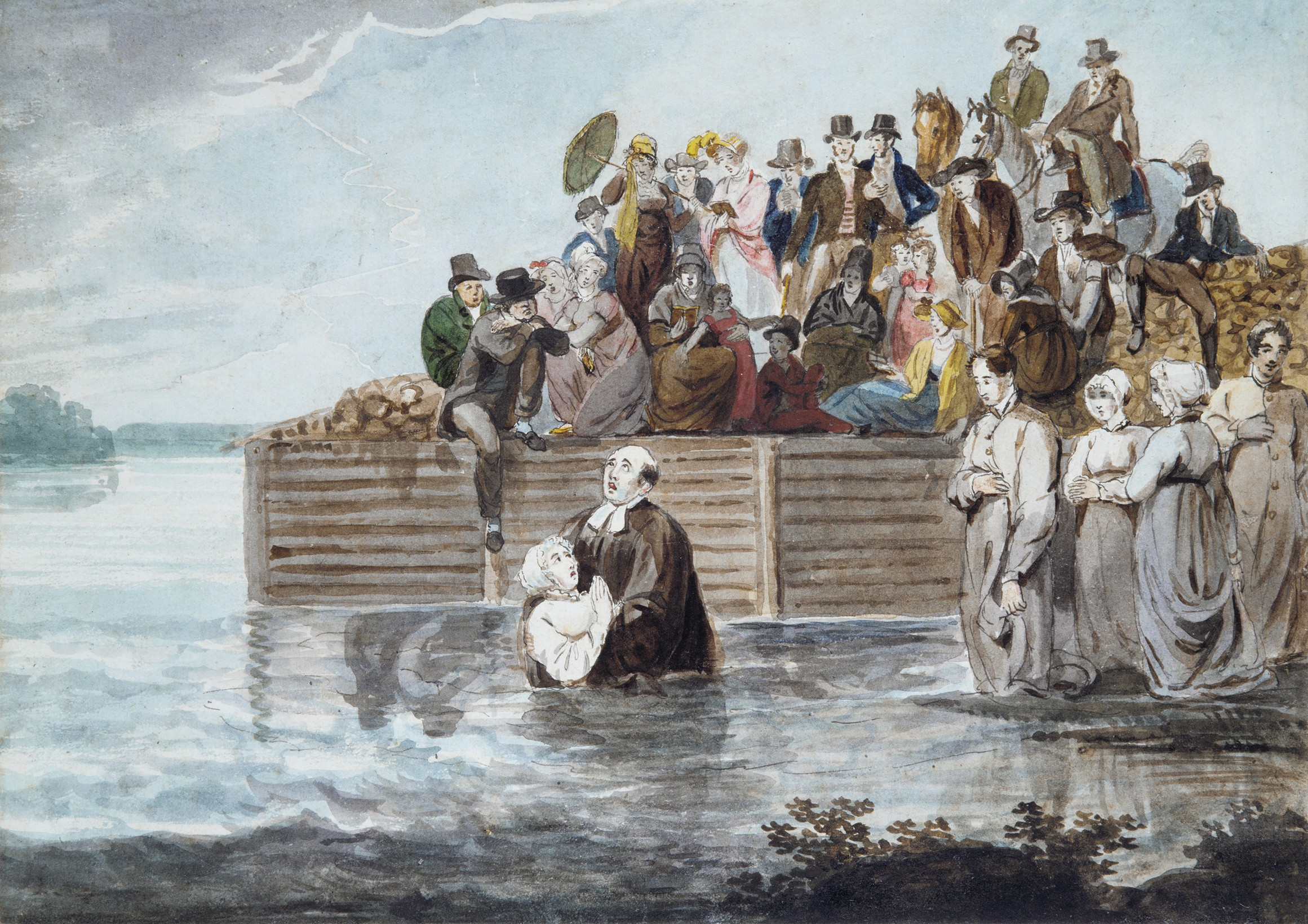
A Philadelphia Anabaptist Immersion during a Storm, Pavel Petrovich Svinin, ca. 1811-13.

The Anabaptist view of baptism is one of its outstanding features. In their view, baptism was reserved for repentant believers who were aware that their sins had been forgiven, not unknowing infants. In this view they defied both the Roman Catholic Church and the Protestant Reformers. In addition, Anabaptists rejected all Roman Catholic and Magisterial Protestant baptism as invalid. They therefore re-baptized those whom they regarded as not having received any Christian initiation at all, and claimed that their baptism after profession of faith was the recipient's first legitimate baptism. Reportedly, one of the first adult baptisms of the Reformation was publicly performed in Zürich, Switzerland, in January 1525. According to the Schleitheim Confession (1527), baptism is strictly for those who have learned repentance, excluding the practice of infant baptism.

Early Anabaptist theologians conceptualized baptism as a threefold reality: an inward baptism of the Spirit through repentance, an outward water baptism testifying to obedience and church incorporation, and a baptism of blood represented by suffering witness and martyrdom.

The Dordrecht Confession (1632) similarly established that only penitent believers who have experienced regeneration should be incorporated into the communion of saints via water baptism.

The concept of believers' baptism drew the main attention of 16th-century Continental Anabaptists, but the mode was also an issue. The majority appear to have taught and practiced baptism by pouring, while a minority practiced baptism by immersion. The writings of Menno Simons seem at times to promote immersion as the proper mode, but his practice was by pouring. Bernhard Rothmann argued for immersion in his Bekentnisse, and Pilgram Marpeck copied this idea into his Vermanung, but weakened the position by accepting pouring or sprinkling as an alternate mode. The mode of baptism was debated by the Hutterites and the Polish Brethren around the turn of the 17th century, and the arguments for immersion by Polish leader Christoph Ostorodt were incorporated into the Racovian Confession of Faith in 1604. Servetus made a strong case for immersion. The Mennonites, Swiss Brethren, South German Anabaptists, and Hutterites were not as concerned about mode, and, while not rejecting immersion, found pouring much more practical and believed it to be the Scriptural mode. As such, Anabaptist denominations such as the Mennonites, Amish and Hutterites use pouring as the mode to administer believer's baptism, whereas Anabaptists of the Schwarzenau Brethren, River Brethren and Apostolic Christian traditions baptize by immersion.

In the practice of the Apostolic Christian Church, after a seeker receives believer's baptism, the new believer is sealed with the Holy Spirit of promise.

=== Lord's supper ===
In the early Anabaptist Schleitheim Confession, breaking of bread is the term used for the Lord's Supper, also known as communion or eucharist. A Short Confession of Faith, articulated by the early Anabaptist theologian Hans de Ries, established that the Lord's Supper outwardly signifies the breaking of Christ's body for the remission of sins.

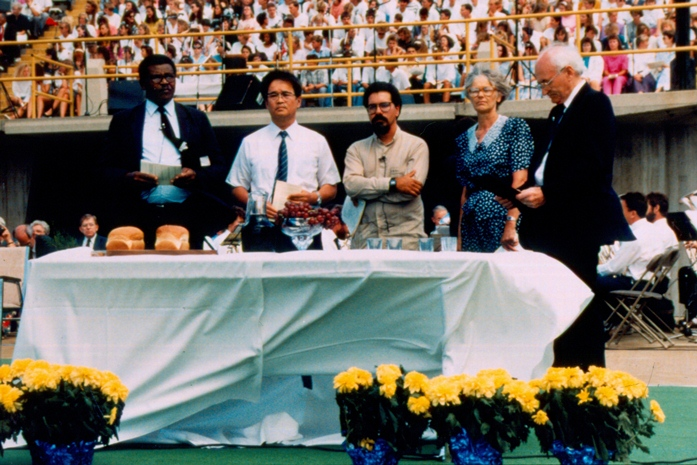
Mennonites, an Anabaptist denomination, celebrating the Lord's Supper

In Anabaptism, the corporate nature (fellowship, unity) of participation is emphasized to a greater degree than other Christian denominations. Pilgram Marpeck wrote, "As members of one body, we proclaim the death of Christ and bodily union attained by untainted brotherly love." Marpeck further wrote, "The true meaning of communion is mystified and obscured by the word sacrament." In connection with the Lord's supper, many Anabaptists stress the rite of feet washing. Anabaptists do not as much emphasize the presence of Jesus in the eucharistic elements themselves, but the mysterious communion with the living Christ that operates through the unified body of believers. As such, in celebrations of Holy Communion, Anabaptist congregations looked to the living Christ to transform their members into one united body.

Anabaptism sees itself as emulating the practice of early Christianity, returning to an unadorned faith. In the present day, a number of Anabaptist congregations have affirmed a theology of the real presence (such as the Chambersburg Christian Fellowship).

=== Marriage ===
Both the Bible and the teachings of the Church Fathers shape Anabaptist theology on the permanence of marriage. Mennonite theologian Daniel Kauffman wrote in Doctrines of the Bible that marriage is a divine ordinance designed for the preservation and purity of the human family. The teaching in the Church Polity of the Dunkard Brethren Church, a Conservative Anabaptist denomination in the Schwarzenau Brethren tradition, highlights marriage as an institution appointed by God to be a lifelong covenant of love.

Anabaptist denominations, such as the Mennonite Christian Fellowship, teach the sinfulness of remarriage after a divorce has occurred. The Biblical Mennonite Alliance holds that divorced and remarried persons are living in adultery and are therefore in an ongoing state of sin that can only be forgiven through separation.

=== Footwashing ===
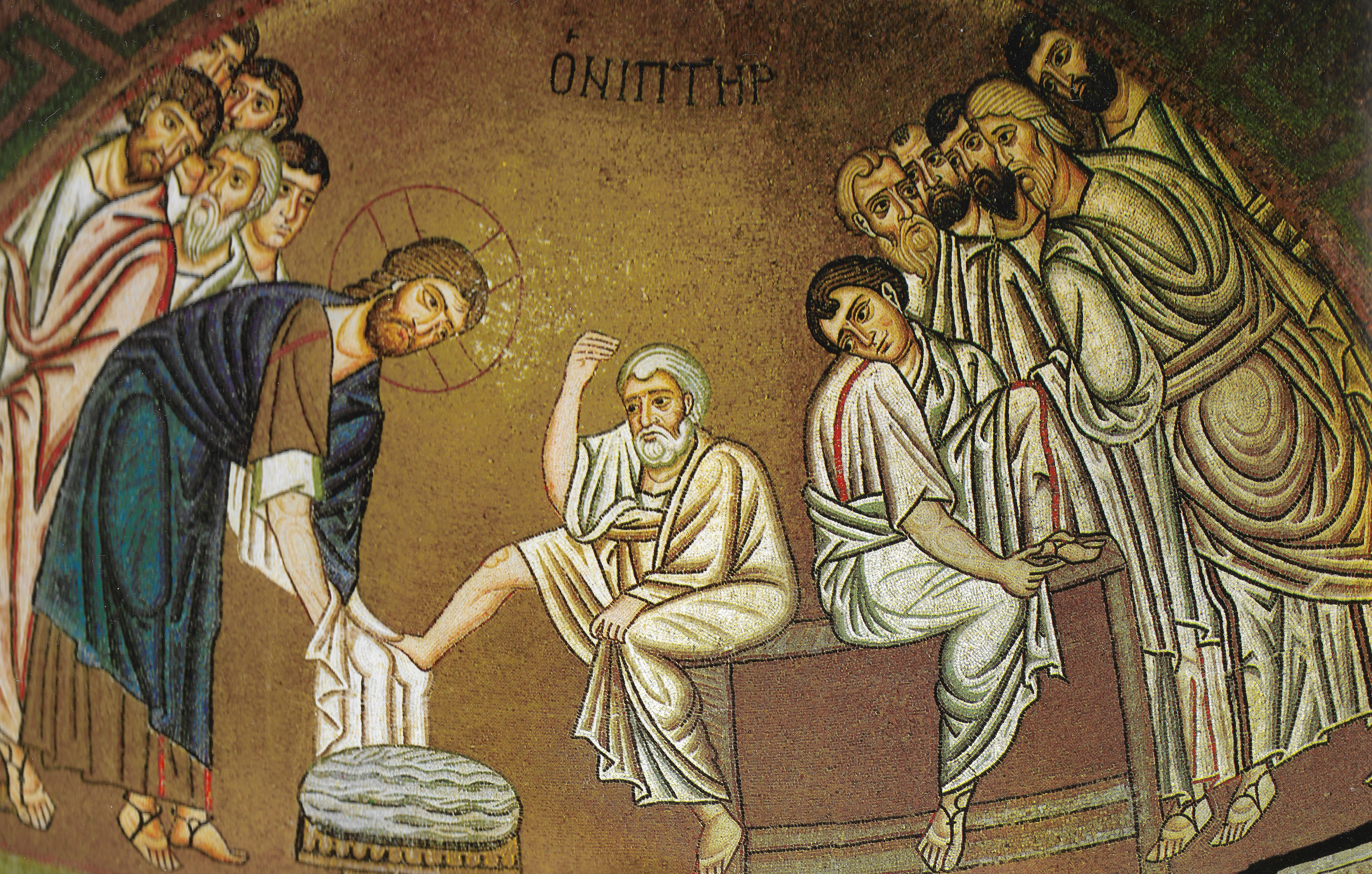
An ancient mosaic depicting footwashing done by Jesus to his disciples

Many Anabaptist communities, with the Hutterites being a notable exception, practice footwashing in obedience of Jesus' command in John 13:1–17 for those who follow him to wash one another's feet. After the death of the apostles or the end of the Apostolic Age, the practice was continued by the early church. Mennonite theologian J. C. Wenger stated that there are no valid exegetical considerations against observing feet washing that wouldn't also apply to baptism.

=== Anointing with oil ===
Anabaptists observe the ordinance of anointing of the sick in obedience to James 5:14–15. In a compendium of Anabaptist doctrine, Daniel Kauffman stated that the anointing oil is a symbol of God's grace applied to the sick in answer to the prayers of the righteous.

The Church Polity of the Dunkard Brethren Church, a Conservative Anabaptist denomination in the Schwarzenau Brethren tradition, teaches that the anointing of the sick was intended by the Lord to be perpetuated within His Church.

=== Holy kiss ===
Anabaptists greet one another with a holy kiss (especially during the Lovefeast), in obedience to the injunctions in the New Testament in 16:16, 16:20, 13:12, 5:26, and 5:14. This Apostolic ordinance was enjoined by the early Church Fathers, such as Tertullian, who wrote that before leaving a house, Christians are to give the Holy Kiss and say "peace to this house"; the Holy Kiss was exchanged during worship as well. Mennonite theologian and bishop Daniel Kauffman taught that the Anabaptist ordinance of the Holy Kiss was emphasized five times in the Bible by the Apostles, who aimed to guide their followers to attain the highest degree of Christian perfection.

=== Headcovering for women ===
Anabaptist Christianity traditionally calls for the wearing of a headcovering by women in obedience to 1 Corinthians 11:1–16. A Conservative Anabaptist publication titled The Significance of the Christian Woman's Veiling, authored by Merle Ruth, teaches that the veiling must be worn continually to signify that the wearer respects God's order. Anabaptist expositor Daniel Willis cites the Early Church Father John Chrysostom's explication of Saint Paul's teaching in 1 Corinthians 11 as the basis for continual headcovering among women. Saint Paul's assertions regarding the angels specify that women being unveiled is dishonourable, meaning Christian women should cover their heads continually.

== Ethics and daily living ==
=== Modest apparel ===
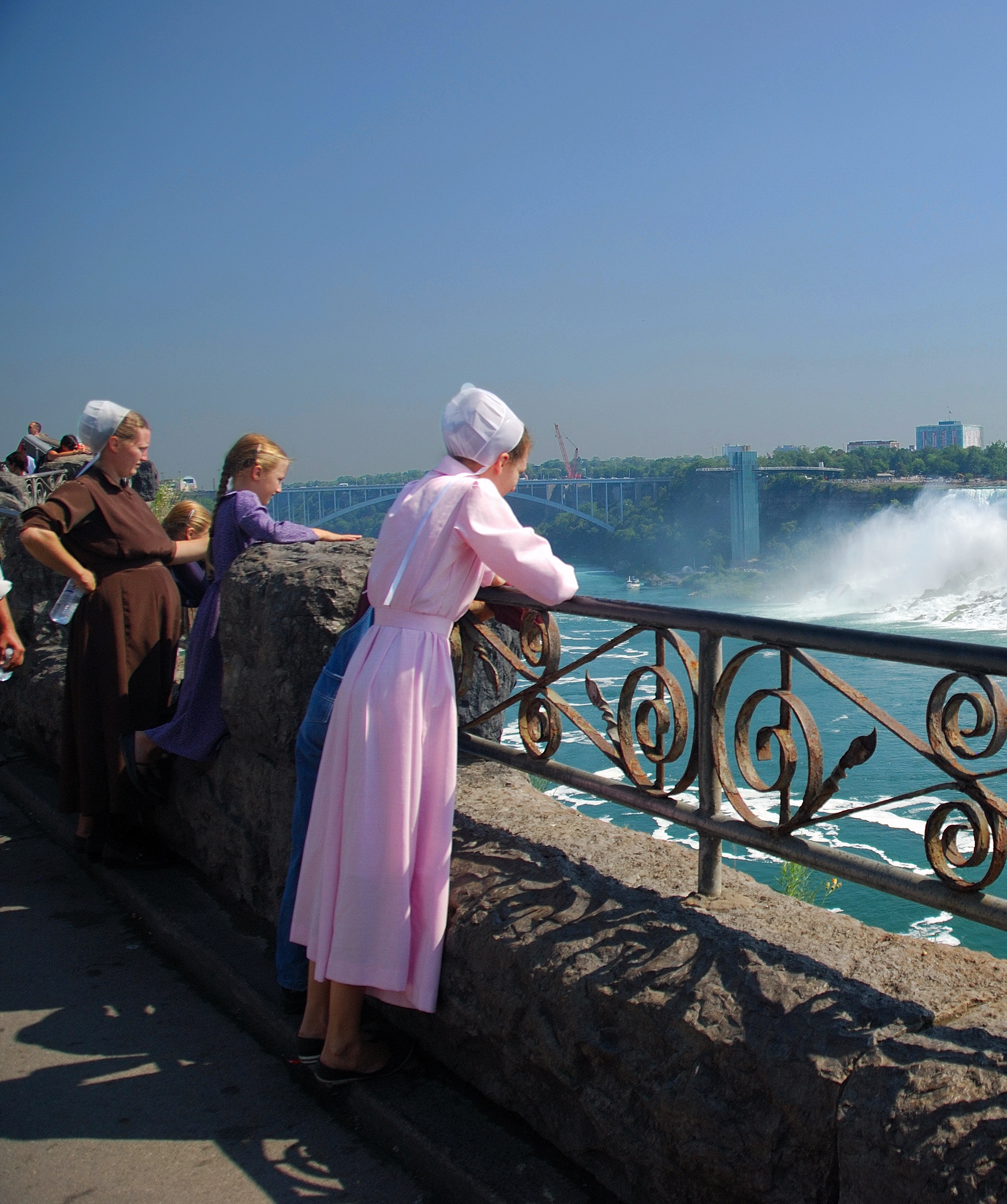
An Anabaptist Christian lady wearing a cape dress and headcovering

Anabaptist Christianity stresses the importance of modesty, with traditional Anabaptist communities practicing this in the form of plain dress. This practice is a reflection of the Anabaptist doctrine of the nonconformity to the world, which is derived from Romans 12:2. The influential Mennonite bishop Daniel Kauffman explains that there are two categories of humans: those that follow the world, and those that follow the body of Christ, who must avoid conforming to worldly standards. The transformation spoken of in Romans 12:2, according to Kauffman, involves a change of mind that leads to a change in all things subject to the mind. Furthermore, James 1:27 references being "unspotted from the world", which Kauffman references to explain that a Christian wearing worldly garb is as inconsistent as a soldier wearing enemy attire.

Anabaptist Christian denominations that observe the wearing of plain dress, such as the Schwarzenau Brethren Anabaptists, do so because Jesus condemned anxious thought for raiment in Matthew 6:25–33 and Luke 12:22–31. They teach that the wearing of plain dress is scripturally commanded in 1 Timothy 2:9–10, 1 Peter 3:3–5, and 1 Corinthians 11:5–6, in addition to being taught by the early Church Fathers. Indeed, in the early Christian manual Paedagogus, the injunction for clothing to extend past the knees was enjoined. With the adjective kosmios (κόσμιος) meaning "modest", 1 Timothy 2:9–10 uses the Greek word catastola katastolé (καταστολῇ) for the apparel suitable for Christian females, and for this reason, women belonging to Conservative Anabaptist denominations often wear a cape dress with a headcovering; for example, ladies who are members of the Charity Christian Fellowship wear the cape dress with an opaque hanging veil as the denomination teaches that the sisters are bound to wear a double-layered garment.

=== Lord's day ===
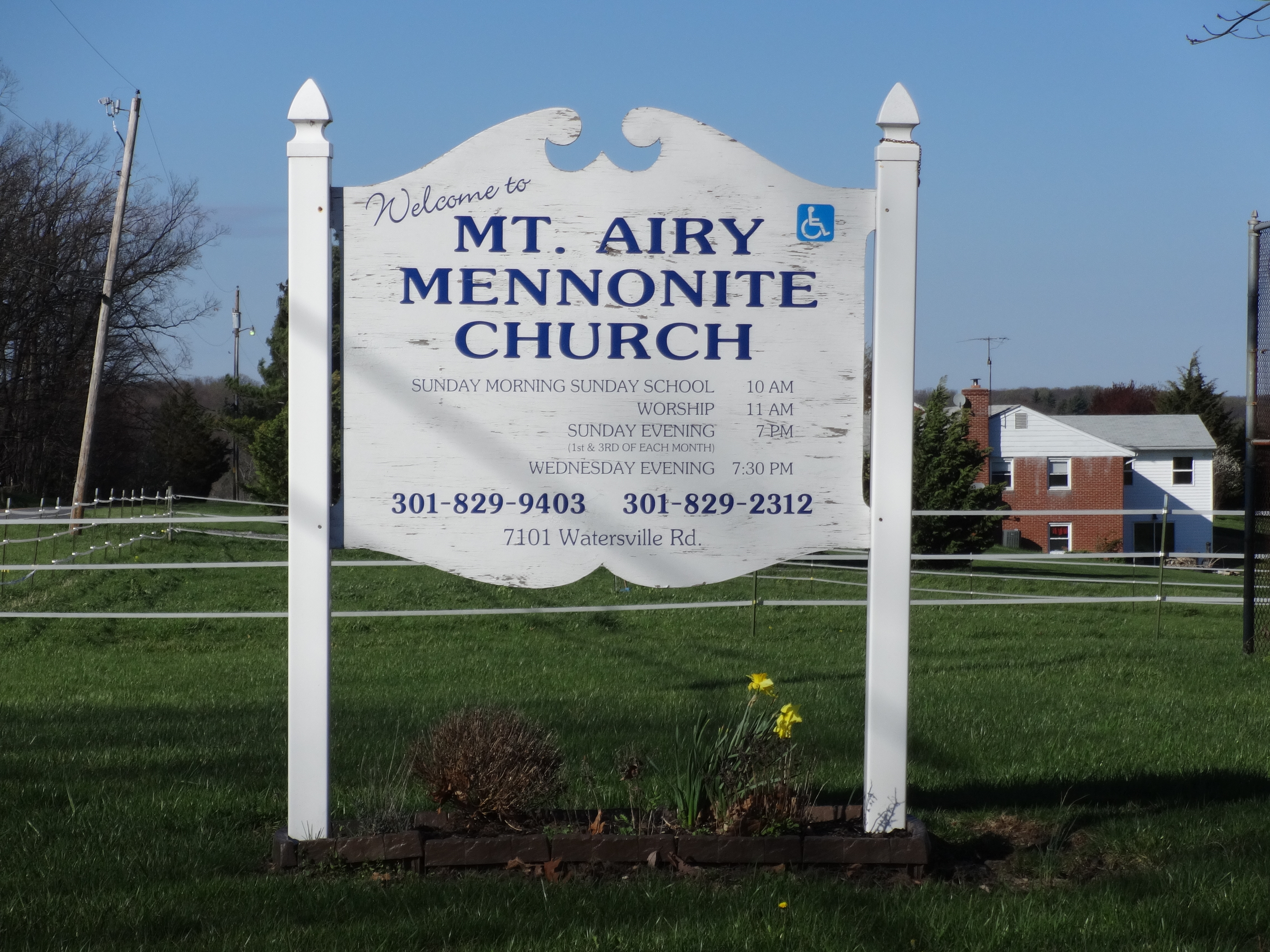
A sign of a Conservative Mennonite church providing the Lord's Day timings for Sunday School, the morning service and the evening service, in addition to the timing for the midweek Wednesday evening service

Anabaptists hold that the Lord's Day should be commemorated through the attendance of church services, along with works of mercy such as witnessing for God, visiting the sick, or studying the Bible. In the view of Anabaptist Christianity, engaging in worldly entertainment distracts the mind from Christ and fails to properly honor His resurrection. The Statement of Faith and Practice of Salem Amish Mennonite Church, a Conservative Mennonite congregation in the Beachy Amish Mennonite tradition, asserts that Sunday burdens such as buying and selling must be avoided so God's people can gather in reverence. The Church Polity of the Dunkard Brethren Church, a Conservative Anabaptist denomination in the Schwarzenau Brethren tradition, teaches that the first day of the week serves as the Christian Sabbath and is to be kept holy.

== See also ==
- Believer's baptism
- Christian pacifism
- Martyrs Mirror
- Nonconformity to the world
- Nonresistance
- Radical Reformation
- Schleitheim Confession

== Notes and references ==
=== Sources ===
- Anabaptist Mennonite Network (1993). "Feetwashing in the Church of the Brethren".
- Anderson, Cory; Anderson, Jennifer (2019). Fitted to Holiness: How Modesty is Achieved and Compromised among the Plain People. Millersburg, OH: Acorn Publishing.
- Anderson, Cory (2012). "Mennonite Christian Fellowship". Global Anabaptist Mennonite Encyclopedia Online.
- Apostolic Christian Church of America (2022). Statement of Faith. Morton, IL: Apostolic Christian Church of America.
- Bangs, Carl (1985). Arminius: A Study in the Dutch Reformation. Eugene, OR: F. Asbury Press.
- Batten, Alicia J. (2018). "Early Anabaptist Interpretation of the Letter of James". The Conrad Grebel Review. 36 (1): 54–70.
- Bauman, Clarence (1991). The Spiritual Legacy of Hans Denck: Interpretation and Translation of Key Texts. Leiden, Netherlands: Brill.
- Bender, Harold S. (1944). The Anabaptist Vision. Scottdale, PA: Herald Press.
- Bender, Harold S. (1953). "Arminianism". Global Anabaptist Mennonite Encyclopedia Online.
- Bender, Harold S. (1990). The Mennonite Encyclopedia: A Comprehensive Reference Work on the Anabaptist-Mennonite Movement. Scottdale, PA: Mennonite Brethren Publishing House.
- Brackney, William H. (2012). Historical Dictionary of Radical Christianity. Lanham, MD: Scarecrow Press.
- Brewer, Brian C. (2021). T&T Clark Handbook of Anabaptism. London, UK: Bloomsbury Publishing.
- Caniglia, John (6 August 2015). "A refusal to sue: The Amish's religious beliefs make them vulnerable in everyday life". The Plain Dealer.
- Choe, Ezra (26 September 2023). "Guides: Radical Reformation/Anabaptist studies: Theology and Theologians". Baylor University.
- Christianity Today (1 January 1985). "The Anabaptists: Did You Know?". Christianity Today.
- ChristLife (2017). "Learning from the Bruderhof: An Intentional Christian Community". ChristLife.
- Denck, Hans (1976). Selected Writings of Hans Denck. Pittsburgh, PA: Pickwick Press.
- deSilva, David A. (2018). Introducing the Apocrypha: Message, Context, and Significance. Grand Rapids, MI: Baker Books.
- Deutsche Biographie (2025). "Ambrosius Spittelmaier". Deutsche Biographie.
- Dordrecht Confession (1632). The Dordrecht Confession of Faith. Dordrecht: Mennonite Church.
- Dunkard Brethren Church (2021). Dunkard Brethren Church Polity. Lititz, PA: Dunkard Brethren Church.
- Dyck, Cornelius J.; Keeney, William E.; Beachy, Alvin J. (1992). The Writings of Dirk Philips. Scottdale, PA: Herald Press.
- Eby, Edwin R. (2020). "How Secure Is a Believer?". Anabaptist Resources.
- Fahlbusch, Erwin; Lochman, Jan Milic; Bromiley, Geoffrey William; Mbiti, John S.; Pelikan, Jaroslav; Barrett, David B.; Vischer, Lukas (1999). The Encyclopedia of Christianity. Grand Rapids, MI: Wm. B. Eerdmans Publishing.
- Fieldhouse, Paul (2017). Food, Feasts, and Faith: An Encyclopedia of Food Culture in World Religions. Santa Barbara, CA: ABC-CLIO.
- Finger, Thomas N. (2004). A Contemporary Anabaptist Theology: Biblical, Historical, Constructive. Downers Grove, IL: InterVarsity Press.
- Fretz, Clarence Y. (2021). "How To Make SURE You Are Saved". Anabaptists.
- González, Antonio (2007). "Grace and Freedom: An Anabaptist Perspective". The Conrad Grebel Review. 25 (2).
- Grace, W. Madison (2015). "Early English Baptists' View of the Lord's Supper". Southwestern Journal of Theology. 57 (2): 161–162.
- Hartzler, Rachel Nafziger (2013). No Strings Attached: Boundary Lines in Pleasant Places: A History of Warren Street / Pleasant Oaks Mennonite Church. Eugene, OR: Wipf and Stock Publishers.
- Hauerwas, Stanley (2015). The Work of Theology. Grand Rapids, MI: Wm. B. Eerdmans Publishing.
- Hershberger, Guy F. (2001). The Recovery of the Anabaptist Vision. Eugene, OR: Wipf & Stock Publishers.
- Hiebert, Frances F. (Fall 2001). "The Atonement in Anabaptist Theology". Direction. 30 (2): 122–138.
- Hostetler, John A. (1993). Amish Society. Baltimore, MD: JHU Press.
- Hubmaier, Balthasar (1527). On the Sword: A Christian Exposition of the Scriptures. Nikolsburg: Simprecht Sorg.
- Janzen, Rod (2009). Paul Tschetter: The Story of a Hutterite Immigrant Leader, Pioneer, and Pastor. Eugene, OR: Wipf and Stock Publishers.
- Jost, Franklyn (2022). "The Bible". In Brian C. Brewer (ed.). T&T Clark Handbook of Anabaptism. London, UK: Bloomsbury Publishing. pp. 355–372.
- Kauffman, Daniel (1898). Manual of Bible Doctrines. Elkhart, IN: Mennonite Publishing Co.
- Kennel, Denis (2017). De l'esprit au salut: Une anthropologie anabaptiste. Paris, France: Les Éditions du Cerf.
- Klassen, William (1981). Anabaptism in Outline. Scottdale, PA: Herald Press.
- Koop, Karl (2004). Anabaptist-Mennonite Confessions of Faith: The Development of a Tradition. Kitchener, ON: Pandora Press.
- Koop, Karl (2019). Confessions of Faith in the Anabaptist Tradition: 1527-1676. Walden, NY: Plough Publishing House.
- Koryakin, Sergey (2021). "Abandoning Penal Substitution: A Patristic Inspiration for Contemporary Protestant Understanding of the Atonement". Religions. 12 (9): 785. doi:10.3390/rel12090785.
- Kraybill, Donald B. (2010). Concise Encyclopedia of Amish, Brethren, Hutterites, and Mennonites. Baltimore, MD: JHU Press.
- Kurian, George Thomas; Day, Sarah Claudine (2017). The Essential Handbook of Denominations and Ministries. Grand Rapids, MI: Baker Books.
- LancasterPA (2021). "Amish Grace and Forgiveness". LancasterPA.com.
- MacGregor, Kirk R. (2023). "Fallen Humanity and Its Redemption: Mainstream Sixteenth-Century Anabaptist Views vis-à-vis Arminian Baptist and Traditional Baptist Positions" (PDF). The Journal for Baptist Theology and Ministry. 20 (2): 173–188.
- Martin, Nolan C. (2022a). "Key Differences Between Evangelicals and Anabaptists". Charity Christian Fellowship.
- Martin, Lynn (2022b). "The Case for an Anabaptist-like Christianity". Anabaptist Faith.
- Martin, Harold S. (2025). "The Election of God" (PDF). Anabaptist Resources.
- The Mercury News (7 December 2010). "She has forgiven, but lack of insurance won't let Amish woman forget". The Mercury News.
- Murray, Stuart (1999). Biblical Interpretation in the Anabaptist Tradition. Kitchener, ON: Pandora Press.
- Murray, Stuart (2022). "Ecclesiology". In Brian C. Brewer (ed.). T&T Clark Handbook of Anabaptism. London, UK: Bloomsbury Publishing. pp. 207–222.
- Nolt, Steven M.; Loewen, Harry (2010). Through Fire and Water: An Overview of Mennonite History. Harrisonburg, VA: MennoMedia.
- Oyer, John S. (1996). "Is there an Amish Theology". In Lydie Hege; Christoph Wiebe (eds.). Les Amish : origine et particularismes 1693-1993, The Amish : origin and characteristics 1693-1993. Ingersheim, Haut-Rhin: Association Française d'Histoire Anabaptiste-Mennonite. pp. 278–302.
- Pathway Publishers (1992). 1001 Questions and Answers on the Christian Life. Aylmer, ON: Pathway Publishers.
- Pettegree, Andrew (2000). The Reformation World. London, UK: Psychology Press.
- Pilli, Toivo (2022). "Discipleship". In Brian C. Brewer (ed.). T&T Clark Handbook of Anabaptism. London, UK: Bloomsbury Publishing. pp. 405–421.
- Pitts, Jamie; Tapia Rubio, Luis (2023). "Anabaptist Theology". St Andrews Encyclopaedia of Theology.
- Plough (2017). "The Martyrs of Alcatraz". Plough.
- Redekop, Calvin; Beitzel, Terry (2019). Service, The Path To Justice. Victoria, BC: FriesenPress.
- Riedemann, Peter; Friesen, John J. (1999). Peter Riedemann's Hutterite Confession of Faith: Translation of the 1565 German Edition. Waterloo, ON: Herald Press.
- Roth, Allen (2 April 2021). "Do Divorced and Remarried Persons Need to Separate? Adultery: An Act or a State?". Biblical Mennonite Alliance.
- Roth, Mark (12 December 2004). "Anabaptists: A Faith That Works". Christian Light Publications.
- Ruth, Merle (2022). The Significance of the Christian Woman's Veiling. Harrisonburg, VA: Christian Light Publications.
- Salem Amish Mennonite Church (2012). Statement of Faith and Practice. Bakersville, OH: Salem Amish Mennonite Church.
- Schaff, Philip (1889). A Select Library of the Nicene and Post-Nicene Fathers of the Christian Church: St. Chrysostom. New York, NY: The Christian Literature Company.
- Schleitheim Confession (1527). The Schleitheim Confession. Schleitheim: Swiss Brethren.
- Scott, Stephen (1996). Introduction to Old Order and Conservative Mennonite Groups: People's Place Book No. 12. Intercourse, PA: Good Books.
- Sheldrake, Philip (2005). The New Westminster Dictionary of Christian Spirituality. Louisville, KY: Westminster John Knox Press.
- Simons, Menno (1956). The Complete Writings of Menno Simons, c. 1496-1561. Scottdale, PA: Herald Press.
- Snyder, Arnold (2006). "Was the Bread Only Bread, and the Wine Only Wine? Sacramental Theology in Five Anabaptist Hymns". Conrad Grebel University College.
- Snyder, C. Arnold (1995). Anabaptist History and Theology: An Introduction. Kitchener, ON: Pandora Press.
- Snyder, C. Arnold (2004). Following in the Footsteps of Christ: The Anabaptist Tradition. Maryknoll, NY: Orbis Books.
- Steinberg, Aliza (2020). Weaving in Stones: Garments and Their Accessories in the Mosaic Art of Eretz Israel in Late Antiquity. Oxford, UK: Archaeopress Publishing Ltd.
- Stutzman, Paul Fike (2011). Recovering the Love Feast: Broadening Our Eucharistic Celebrations. Eugene, OR: Wipf and Stock Publishers.
- Sutton, Jerry (2012). "Anabaptism and James Arminius: A Study in Soteriological Kinship and Its Implications" (PDF). Midwestern Journal of Theology. 11 (2): 121–139.
- Swartz, David (3 October 2016). "Time to be an Anabaptist". Jesus Creed.
- Taylor, Dean (24 November 2008). "05. Divorce and also Remarriage in the Early Church". Radical Reformation.
- Third Way (2021). "Lawsuits". Third Way.
- Volf, Miroslav; Volf, Dorothy C. (2001). Practicing Theology: Beliefs and Practices in Christian Life. Grand Rapids, MI: Wm. B. Eerdmans Publishing.
- Weaver, J. Denny (2018). "Christology". Global Anabaptist Mennonite Encyclopedia Online.
- Wenger, Glenn (9 May 2022). Verna Martin (ed.). "The Sabbath or the Lord's Day". Anabaptist Resources.
- Wesner, Erik J. (18 July 2010). "The Bible". Amish America.
- White, Peter (2002). Predestination, Policy and Polemic: Conflict and Consensus in the English Church from the Reformation to the Civil War. Cambridge, UK: Cambridge University Press. ISBN 978-0-521-89250-6.
- Williams, George Huntston (1957). Spiritual and Anabaptist Writers: Documents Illustrative of the Radical Reformation. Philadelphia, PA: Westminster John Knox Press.
- Willis, Daniel (1 May 2022). "14 Objections to the Head Covering Answered". Sound Faith.
- Winger, Otho (1919). History and Doctrines of the Church of the Brethren. Elgin, IL: Brethren Publishing House.
