= Leupold Scharnschlager =

Anabaptist theologian

Leupold Scharnschlager was an Anabaptist theologian and a writer, some of which are still extant. Leupold was a native of Hopfgarten. Leupold Scharnschlager was a companion and a close associate of Pilgram Marpeck.

Leopold saw the Old Covenant as a "shadow" pointing to the "promise" of the New Covenant, Leupold was a critic of Free Grace theology, defending the view that faith without works is not salvific.
