= Martyrs' Synod =

August 1527 Synod in Augsburg, Germany

Coordinates: 51°02′02″N 9°24′20″E

The Martyrs' Synod was a Christian meeting which took place in Augsburg, Germany, from 20 to 24 August 1527. The purpose of this meeting, attended by about sixty representatives from different Anabaptist groups, was to come to agreement over the differences related to the central Anabaptist teachings among the Swiss and south German Anabaptists.

The Anabaptists were early promoters of freedom of religion during a period in which German-speaking people equated religious freedom with anarchy. The Martyrs' Synod took place just as persecution of the Anabaptists began to escalate throughout Switzerland, Germany, and Austria: it became known as the Martyrs' Synod because most participants were killed for their faith soon afterwards.

== Background ==
The young Anabaptist movement had the difficult task of forming a common foundation from groups of varying belief. In early 1527 under the leadership of Michael Sattler an Anabaptist meeting in Schleitheim had produced a basic Anabaptist confession of faith, the Schleitheim Confession. In this confession, this Anabaptist group renounced participation in government, including the taking of oaths as well as participation in military service. Other groups of Anabaptists, though, including the South German Anabaptists, believed that Romans 13 permitted authorities to require their citizens to swear oaths, perform military service, and an agreement between the Swiss and South German Anabaptists was achieved on this point.

Augsburg was selected as the meeting place because it was a central location for Anabaptist groups. The region of the young Anabaptist movement was confined at this point in time to Switzerland, Alsace, Moravia, and Tyrol. There were a number of strong Anabaptist congregations within Augsburg itself, which in 1527 were still relatively free to meet. Their size accounts for their ability to host 60 participants in a single meeting room and offer accommodations for the visitors.

== Participants ==
Not all of the names of those present at the Synod have been passed down. The following 33 participants are known and arranged among various Anabaptist groups.

The largest group was associated with Hans Hut:

Eukarius Binder of Coburg, Burkhard Braun of Ofen, Leonhard Dorfbrunner of Weißenburg, Hans Gulden of Biberach, Sigmund Hofer, Hans Hut, Marx Meir of Altenerlangen, Joachim Mertz of Bamberg, Hans Mittermaier of Ingolstadt, Georg Nespitzer of Passau, Leonhard Schiemer of Judenburg, Hans Schlaffer, Leonhard Spörle of Briderichingen, Ulrich Trechsel of Franken, Thomas Walhauser, and Jakob Wiedemann of Memmingen. Although not named, it is likely Augustin Bader also attended.

The second largest group were members of one of the Augsburg Anabaptist groups:

Jakob Dachser, Matheis Finder, Gall Fischer, Laux Fischer, Konrad Huber, Hans Kießling, Hans Leupold, Bartholomäus Nußfelder, Siegmund Salminger and Peter Scheppach

The Swiss Anabaptists sent three representatives:

Hans Beck of Basel, Jakob Groß and Gregor Maler of Chur.

Three participants were associated with Hans Denck:

Hans Denck, Ludwig Hätzer und Jakob Kautz of Worms.

The Synod met at the house of weaver Gall Fischer, the house of Konrad Huber, and the house of butcher Matheis Finder. Two of the three meetings were under the leadership of Hans Hut and Hans Denck.

== Business ==
The Martyrs' Synod had no formal rules of order and no minutes were kept. The Synod was only documented in court records of the interrogations many participants later underwent.

The Synod opened with discussions of a proposed Anabaptist oath and bearing of arms. Hans Hut argued against the Swiss Anabaptists position and advocated both oath-taking and military service. He also resisted the demand of the Swiss to establish a uniform dress code for Anabaptists.

Hut had prophesied that in 1528, three and a half years after the German Peasants' War, the Kingdom of God would come, sinners would be punished and authorities exterminated. Participants at the Synod agreed that Jesus Christ's return was imminent, but rejected Hut's calculations and his indication of specific dates and times with references to relevant Bible verses. After a long discussion, Hut did not recant his views, but did promise to no longer openly teach them, but instead to only share them privately.

At the end of the Synod an agreement was made to send out missionaries from Augsburg, to gather as many of the elect as possible. The Anabaptist messengers were individually and in pairs sent to the surrounding area:

Peter Scheppach and Ulrich Trechsel to Worms
Hans Denck and Hans Beck to Basel and the area around Zürich.
Gregor Maler to Vorarlberg
Georg Nespitzer to Mittelfranken
Leonhard Spörler and Leonhard Schiemer to Bern
Leonhard Dorfbrunner to Linz
Hans Mittermaier to Austria and
Eukarius Binder and Joachim Mertz to Salzburg

This mission effort failed. Most of those sent out were martyred shortly after arrival in their designated region, giving this gathering its name, Martyrs' Synod.

== Aftermath ==
When the Augsburg town council learned of the meeting, they had Hans Hut and other participants arrested. They were later tried and sentenced to indefinite imprisonment. Hans Hut was tortured horribly, and accidentally died as a result of a fire which caused his asphyxiation in the Augsburg prison on 6 December 1527. The next day, the authorities sentenced his dead body to death and burned him.

The Martyrs' Synod was both a high point and a turning point in the development of early Anabaptism. For the last time there were so many Anabaptist leaders with varying views. After Augsburg, the Anabaptist continued to be persecuted for more than a hundred years, eventually leading to mass emigrations to North America.
