= Peter Riedemann =

Anabaptist leader and theologian (1506–1556)

- Vorsteher of the Hutterite brethren
- Church: Hutterites
- Installed: 1542
- Term ended: 1556
- Predecessor: Hans Amon

Personal details
- Born: 1506 Hirschberg, Silesia
- Died: 1 December 1556 (aged 49–50) Brodské, Kingdom of Hungary
- Spouse: Katharina
- Occupation: Shoemaker, preacher, theologian, hymnwriter

Peter Riedemann (also Rideman, Rydeman or Ryedeman; 1506 – 1 December 1556) was an Anabaptist preacher, theologian and hymnwriter. He was an elder of the Hutterite brethren in Moravia from 1542 until his death, and is often described as the second founder of the movement after Jakob Hutter.

A shoemaker by trade, Riedemann joined the Anabaptists in Upper Austria in the late 1520s and was imprisoned at Gmunden, Nuremberg and Marburg, spending some nine years in confinement. He wrote both of his doctrinal works in prison. The second, the Rechenschaft unserer Religion, Lehr und Glaubens (Account of Our Religion, Doctrine and Faith), was composed in Hesse in 1540–41 and remains the basic doctrinal statement of the Hutterites.

== Life ==
=== Early years ===
Riedemann was born in 1506 at Hirschberg in Silesia, now Jelenia Góra, Poland, where he trained as a shoemaker. His route into the Radical Reformation is undocumented; Andrea Chudaska notes that Hirschberg installed a Lutheran preacher at its parish church in 1520, but considers the evidence for his contact with Silesian Anabaptist congregations inconclusive.

He first appears in Upper Austria, where Hans Hut and Wolfgang Brandhuber had worked around Linz, Steyr and Gmunden between 1527 and 1529. Brandhuber is thought to be the source of his commitment to community of goods. He was ordained Diener des Wortes in 1529.

=== Imprisonments ===
Riedemann was imprisoned at Gmunden in 1529 and held for three years, acquiring the byname "Peter of Gmunden". There he wrote the Gmundener Rechenschaft. Though he had not yet joined the Hutterites, they preserved the text in manuscript. Robert Friedmann placed it doctrinally near the writings of Hans Schlaffer and Leonhard Schiemer.

He escaped in 1532, worked briefly at Linz, and joined the Hutterite community in Moravia. Around the same time he married an Anabaptist woman, Katharina. Sent as a missionary to Franconia in 1533, he was imprisoned at Nuremberg from 1533 to 1537 and released on undertaking not to preach in the city. Returning through Upper Austria, he assumed pastoral responsibility for the remaining Philippites, to whom six of his surviving epistles are addressed.

=== Hesse, 1540–1542 ===
Riedemann travelled to Hesse in 1539 and again later that year, drawing substantial numbers of converts toward Moravia. He was arrested by the Hessian authorities in about February 1540 and imprisoned at Marburg. Philip of Hesse did not permit the execution of Anabaptists, and Riedemann's conditions were eased: he was allowed to make shoes, then transferred to the castle of Wolkersdorf, where he was largely free to move but remained voluntarily.

He wrote the Rechenschaft there, probably during 1541. His correspondence indicates that he intended it to explain Anabaptist belief to Philip of Hesse.

=== Leadership and death ===
After the death of the Vorsteher Hans Amon in February 1542, Riedemann returned to Moravia and was appointed alongside Leonhard Lanzenstiel, who handled administration while Riedemann taught. A petition of 1545 to the lords of Moravia, enclosing a copy of the Rechenschaft, is attributed to him.

The persecutions of 1547–51 were the severest the communities faced before their expulsion from Moravia in 1622; members were displaced repeatedly and sheltered in underground tunnels, though numbers were replenished by former Gabrielites from Silesia. Riedemann died on 1 December 1556 at a Hutterite Bruderhof in what is now Brodské, Slovakia, aged fifty. (Note: The place of death is given inconsistently in the literature. MennLex names Brodsko (Brodské); the German-language literature gives Brockó, the Hungarian form of the same settlement. Friedmann's 1959 account in the Global Anabaptist Mennonite Encyclopedia instead names a Bruderhof at Protzko, which has not been reconciled with the other identifications.) The Hutterite chronicle records that he had served as a minister for twenty-seven years.

== Writings ==
Riedemann's surviving work comprises doctrinal treatises, epistles and hymns.

The two treatises are the Gmundener Rechenschaft (1529–32) and the Rechenschaft unserer Religion, Lehr und Glaubens (1540–41). The latter was printed in 1565, the only book known to have been published by the Hutterian Brethren in the sixteenth century, and cites some 1,800 scriptural references. It remains the movement's doctrinal standard and is still presented to newly married Hutterite couples. John J. Friesen published an English translation from the 1565 edition in 1999. The most popular contemporary English translation of the Gmundener Rechenschaft is titled Love Is Like Fire, while the John J. Friesen translation of the 1541 Rechenschaft is titled Peter Riedemann's Hutterite Confession of Faith and is part of the Classics of the Radical Reformation Series.

Four of Riedemann's letters were incorporated into the Hutterite chronicle. A manuscript codex held at a Bruderhof in Montana contains a nearly complete collection of thirty-four epistles, six addressed to his wife. The 1914 hymnal Lieder der Hutterischen Brüder contains forty-five of his hymns; hymn 37 of the Ausbund, written at Gmunden, commemorates the death of Hans Langenmantel. Rudolf Wolkan regarded him as the foremost Hutterite hymnwriter.

== Legacy ==
Riedemann's writings gave the Hutterite movement a fixed confessional identity in the decades after Jakob Hutter's execution. Werner Packull has argued that this consolidation both secured a durable doctrinal foundation and produced a more uniform, prescriptively defined community. Chudaska's 2003 study, the first full-length treatment of his life and theology, treats his development as a case study in the formation of Anabaptist lay theology.

== Riedemann in Popular Culture ==
Jason Landsel's graphic novel By Sword (Plough, 2027) dramatizes Riedemann's story, and that of the Hutterites during the time of his leadership.

== See also ==
- Hutterite
- Jakob Hutter
- Radical Reformation
