= Good works =

Person's exterior actions or deeds

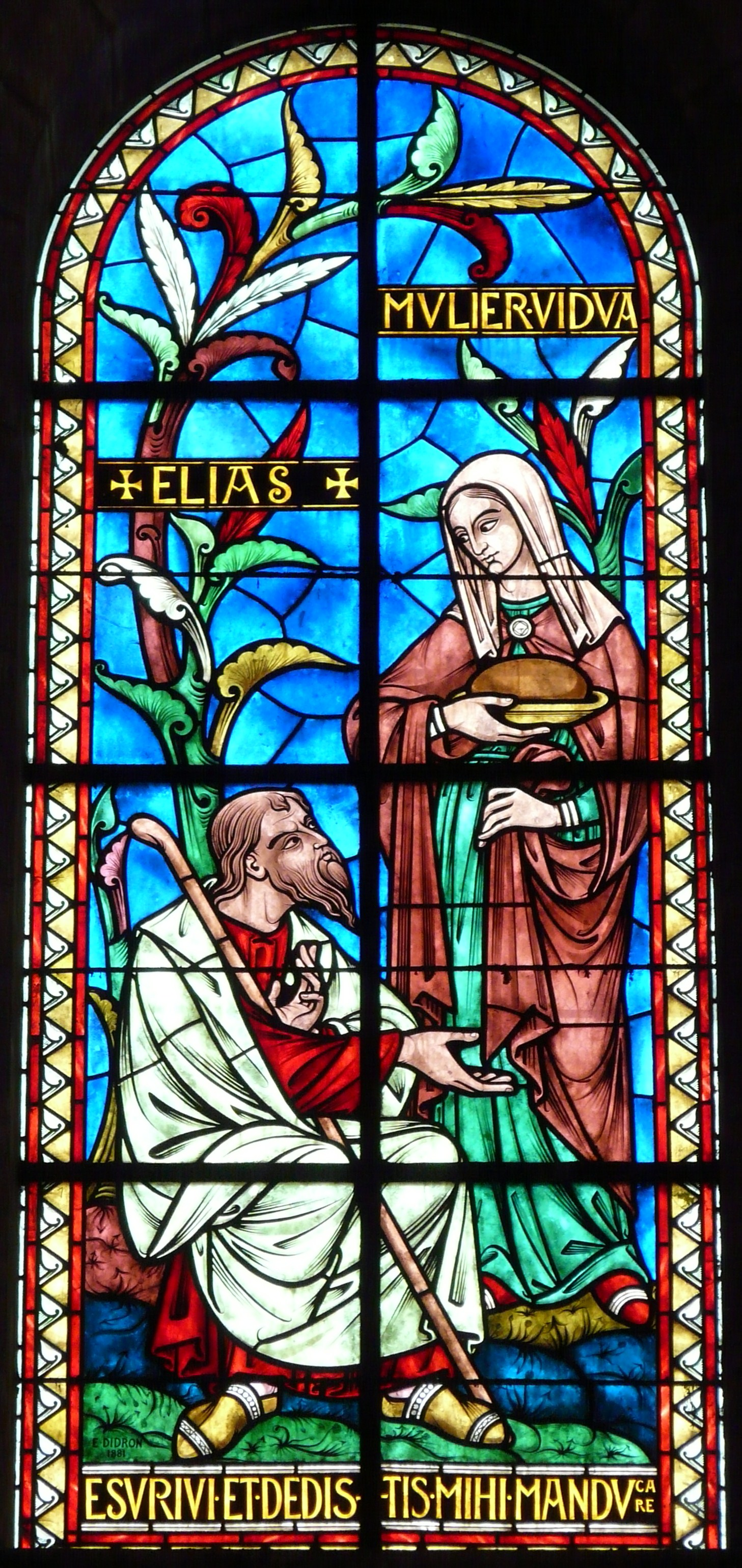
Stained glass window in Périgueux Cathedral depicting the widow of the town of Zarephath giving bread to Elijah

In Christian theology, good works, or simply works, are a person's exterior actions or deeds, in contrast to inner qualities such as grace or faith. This article is concerned with various Christian views on how the performance of good works relates to faith and salvation.

== Views by denomination ==
=== Anabaptist denominations ===
After becoming a believer, Anabaptist theology emphasizes "a faith that works". Anabaptist denominations teach:

... salvation by faith through grace, but such faith must bear “visible fruit in repentance, conversion, regeneration, obedience, and a new life dedicated to the love of God and the neighbor, by the power of the Holy Spirit.”

Obedience to Jesus and other New Testament teachings, loving one another, being at peace with others, and walking in holiness are seen as "earmarks of the saved". Good works thus have an important role in the life of an Anabaptist believer, with the teaching "that faith without works is a dead faith" (cf. James 2:26) occupying a cornerstone in Anabaptist Christianity.

Anabaptists teach that in the believer, "justification begun a dynamic process by which the believer partook of the nature of Christ and was so enabled to live increasingly like Jesus." Peter Riedemann, a Hutterite Anabaptist divine, explained this ontological justification in these words:

In the first place, we believe that we have salvation in Christ. We believe that Christ has redeemed us from the might and snare of the devil, in which we were held captive, for He has robbed the devil of his power and overwhelmed him. The devil's snares are the sins in which we were imprisoned. By sinning we were serving the devil until Christ came to dwell in us by faith. Then through Christ's strength and work in us, our sin was weakened, quenched, put to death, and taken away from us, so that we could live for righteousness. Christ is the one who brings about this righteousness in us, because without him we can do nothing.

Christians of the Anabaptist tradition (who teach salvation by "faith that works") have argued that being a disciple of Jesus by careful obedience to New Testament commands (such as the holy kiss, baptism, communion, headcovering, and feet washing), is "crucial evidence that an individual has repented, believed, and yielded to Christ".

=== Anglican churches ===
The Anglican theological tradition, including The Church of England, The Episcopal Church (United States), and others in the worldwide Anglican Communion as well as those who have broken away from communion but identify with the tradition, contains within it both Protestant and Catholic perspectives on this doctrine.

On the Protestant side, the historic Thirty-nine Articles (1571) included in the Book of Common Prayer contain Article XI which states that "We are accounted righteous before God, only for the merit of our Lord and Savior Jesus Christ by faith and not for our work or deservings" (BCP, p. 870). Some Anglican churches, such as the Church of England, still require clergy to affirm their loyalty to the Articles, while many others such as the Episcopal Church in the US do not see them as normative for clergy. In explaining this Anglican article of faith, John Wordsworth, former Bishop of Salisbury, says that "But by faith we understand not a dead but a living faith, which as naturally leads the believer to do good works for God as a good tree necessarily bears good fruit."

On the Catholic side, the 19th century Oxford Movement re-incorporated a broader understanding of justification into Anglican theology. The publication Tracts for the Times concluded in 1841 with commentary on Article XI in which justification by faith is affirmed as the "'sole internal instrument, not to sole instrument of any kind.' There is nothing inconsistent, then, in Faith being the sole instrument of justification, and yet Baptism also the sole instrument, and that at the same time, because in distinct senses; an inward instrument in no way interfering with an outward instrument, Baptism may be the hand of the giver, and Faith the hand of the receiver.' Nor does the sole instrumentality of Faith interfere with the doctrine of Works as a mean also." In this way, without denying the justification by faith alone in a particular sense, Anglicans may also affirm the necessity of the sacraments (particularly Baptism) as well as works present in a Christian's life:

First, it is the pleading or impetrating principle, or constitutes our title to justification; being analogous among the graces to Moses—lifting up his hands on the Mount, or the Israelites eyeing the Brazen Serpent,—actions which did not merit GOD'S mercy, but asked for it. A number of means go to effect our justification. We are justified by CHRIST alone, in that He has purchased the gift; by Faith alone, in that Faith asks for it; by Baptism alone, for Baptism conveys it; and by newness of heart alone, for newness of heart is the life of it. And, secondly, Faith, as being the beginning or perfect or justifying righteousness, is taken for what it tends towards, or ultimately will be. It is said by anticipation to be that which it promises; just as one might pay a labourer his hire before he began his work. Faith working by love is the seed of divine graces, which in due time will be brought forth and flourish—partly in this world, fully in the next.

In 2017 the Anglican Communion affirmed the 1999 Joint Declaration on the Doctrine of Justification between the Catholic and Lutheran traditions.

=== Baptist churches ===
According to evangelical Baptist theology, good works are the consequence of salvation and not its justification. They are the sign of a sincere and grateful faith. They include actions for the Great Commission, that is, evangelism, service in the Church and charity. They will be rewarded with the grace of God at the last judgment. Good works are claimed by some theologians as evidence of true faith versus false faith from the Epistle of James. A more recent article suggests that the current confusion regarding the Epistle of James about faith and works resulted from Augustine of Hippo's anti-Donatist polemic in the early fifth century. This approach reconciles the views of Paul and James on faith and works without appealing to Augustinian soteriology's "evidence of true faith" view.

=== Catholic Church ===
The Catholic Church teaches that both faith and good works are necessary for salvation:

Protestants and Catholics agree that faith is necessary for salvation. The Bible clearly teaches that it is. Good works alone do not merit salvation. No one can "buy" heaven with enough good works, or good enough motives. The ticket to heaven is not being nice or sincere or good enough; the ticket to heaven is the Blood of Christ, and faith is the acceptance of that free gift. But the [Catholic] Church insists that good works are necessary too. This means the works of love. Good works are not mere external deeds, but the works of love. And love is not mere feelings, but the works of love (charity, agape). That is why Christ can command them; feelings cannot be commanded. St. James clearly teaches that "faith by itself, if it has no works, is dead" (James 2:17). And some of Christ's parables teach that our salvation depends on charity (Matthew 25:40: "as you did it to one of the least of these my brethren, you did it to me").

— Peter Kreeft

Additionally Matthew 16:27 states that the Son of God shall reward every man according to his works.

=== Eastern Orthodox Church ===
The Eastern Orthodox Church teaches the unity of faith and good works as necessary for salvation:

We are first "justified by faith" and then "empowered by God for good works and deeds of righteousness." Orthodoxy believes one has to acquire faith then become righteous so that he can do good works. In essence, one follows the other. However, we do not discuss the one versus the other, as we look at them as a total unit. We believe that they are in union with one another; one cannot exist without the other in order to achieve salvation. It is up to us to commit to and acquire faith through God's mercy, so that we will see the need and have the will to do good works and deeds of righteousness, in the hope we will obtain God's final grace as the last Judgment. Good works is "a necessary consequence of a faith-filled heart," but it is only part of the requirement of salvation. One cannot skip from justification of a faith-filled heart directly to the final step of being saved without performing good works and deeds of righteousness. The two are intimately linked, which allows believers to be assured of salvation through a changed heart and changed actions.

— A.S. Bogeatzes

=== Lutheran churches ===
The Lutheran churches, in the Augsburg Confession, teach that repentance consists of contrition and then faith, which finds its origin in the Gospel and absolution. Good works are the fruit of repentance and are characteristic of the regenerated. The Christian thus declines in sin and "incline[s] to virtue". Lutheranism condemns as heresy antinomianism—the view that Christians are not obligated to keep the moral law—and a father of Lutheranism, Martin Luther, stated:

Faith cannot help doing good works constantly. It doesn't stop to ask if good works ought to be done, but before anyone asks, it already has done them and continues to do them without ceasing. Anyone who does not do good works in this manner is an unbeliever.

The Large Catechism specifies:

Here, then, we have the Ten Commandments, a summary of divine teaching on what we are to do to make our whole life pleasing to God. They are the true fountain from which all good works must spring, the true channel through which all good works must flow.

In Lutheran theology, the Smalcald Articles teach that those who commit mortal sin "when they have fallen, lose faith, the Holy Spirit, the grace of God, and life eternal, and render themselves subject to divine wrath and eternal death unless, turned again, they are reconciled to God through faith."

The Lutheran churches teach that God rewards good works done by Christians; the Apology of the Augsburg Confession teaches: "We also affirm what we have often said, that although justification and eternal life go along with faith, nevertheless, good works merit other bodily and spiritual rewards and degrees of reward. According to 1 Corinthians 3:8, ‘Each will receive his wages according to his labor.’"

=== Reformed churches ===
The Reformed principle of sola fide states that no matter what a person's action, salvation comes through faith alone.

=== Methodist churches ===
With regard to good works, A Catechism on the Christian Religion: The Doctrines of Christianity with Special Emphasis on Wesleyan Concepts teaches:

...after a man is saved and has genuine faith, his works are important if he is to keep justified.
James 2:20-22, "But wilt thou known, O vain main, that faith without (apart from) works is dead? Was not Abraham our father justified by works, when he had offered Isaac his son upon the altar? Seest thou faith wrought with works, and by works was faith made perfect?

The Methodist churches affirm the doctrine of justification by faith, but in Wesleyan–Arminian theology, justification refers to "pardon, the forgiveness of sins", rather than "being made actually just and righteous", which Methodists believe is accomplished through sanctification. John Wesley, the founder of the Methodist churches, taught that the keeping of the moral law contained in the Ten Commandments, as well as engaging in the works of piety and the works of mercy, were "indispensable for our sanctification". After the experience of the New Birth (as well as after the experience of Entire Sanctification), Methodist doctrine affirms "the progressive growth in grace toward Christian maturity through a consistent Christian life of faith and good works".

Wesley understood faith as a necessity for salvation, even calling it "the sole condition" of salvation, in the sense that it led to justification, the beginning point of salvation. At the same time, "as glorious and honorable as [faith] is, it is not the end of the commandment. God hath given this honor to love alone" ("The Law Established through Faith II," §II.1). Faith is "an unspeakable blessing" because "it leads to that end, the establishing anew the law of love in our hearts" ("The Law Established through Faith II," §II.6) This end, the law of love ruling in our hearts, is the fullest expression of salvation; it is Christian perfection.

— Amy Wagner

Methodist soteriology emphasize the importance of the pursuit of holiness in salvation. Thus, for Methodists, "true faith...cannot subsist without works". Bishop Scott J. Jones writes that Methodist theology teaches that:

Faith is necessary to salvation unconditionally. Good works are necessary only conditionally, that is if there is time and opportunity. The thief on the cross in Luke 23:39-43 is Wesley's example of this. He believed in Christ and was told, "Truly I tell you, today you will be with me in Paradise." This would be impossible if the good works that are the fruit of genuine repentance and faith were unconditionally necessary for salvation. The man was dying and lacked time; his movements were confined and he lacked opportunity. In his case, faith alone was necessary. However, for the vast majority of human beings good works are necessary for continuance in faith because those persons have both the time and opportunity for them.

Bishop Jones concludes that "Methodist doctrine thus understands true, saving faith to be the kind that, give time and opportunity, will result in good works. Any supposed faith that does not in fact lead to such behaviors is not genuine, saving faith." Methodist evangelist Phoebe Palmer stated that "justification would have ended with me had I refused to be holy." While "faith is essential for a meaningful relationship with God, our relationship with God also takes shape through our care for people, the community, and creation itself." Methodism, inclusive of the holiness movement, thus teaches that "justification [is made] conditional on obedience and progress in sanctification" emphasizing "a deep reliance upon Christ not only in coming to faith, but in remaining in the faith." Methodist theologian Brian Black summarizes Wesleyan doctrine on works of righteousness in relation to salvation:

One must always strive to do his utmost for God out of love for Him, but in order to maintain salvation, a person must not willfully disobey God. All Christians must keep firmly in mind that none will have their sins forgiven by any efforts of their own. We are totally saved by grace through faith in Christ. Yet, we must never forget that one who is just shall live by faith (Ro 1:17). It is not a single act of faith but a continual life of faith that leads to final salvation (Ro 11:19-22). The word translated faith can also be translated faithfulness. To have faith in Christ also means to be faithful to Christ. Faithfulness to Christ involves keeping the commands of Christ. At the judgment, Christ will tell those who commit iniquity to depart from Him (Mt 7:23)

Richard P. Bucher, contrasts this position with the Lutheran one, discussing an analogy put forth by the founder of the Methodist Church, John Wesley:

Whereas in Lutheran theology the central doctrine and focus of all our worship and life is justification by grace through faith, for Methodists the central focus has always been holy living and the striving for perfection. Wesley gave the analogy of a house. He said repentance is the porch. Faith is the door. But holy living is the house itself. Holy living is true religion. "Salvation is like a house. To get into the house you first have to get on the porch (repentance) and then you have to go through the door (faith). But the house itself—one's relationship with God—is holiness, holy living" (Joyner, paraphrasing Wesley, 3).

=== Oriental Orthodox Churches ===
The Coptic Orthodox Church teaches:

The absence of good works means that faith is dead and fruitless. Therefore, good works are the fruits of faith and the evidence of its presence, and with such, faith is perfected. Good works, however, are not from our volition only. We need the support of God's grace and the work of the Holy Spirit within us, for Jesus said "Without me ye can do nothing." (John 15:5)

The Coptic Orthodox Church says that a living faith should demonstrate good works, which are "the fruits of the work of the Holy Spirit within us and are the fruits requisite for the life of penitence which we should live". Additionally, good works are "evidence of God's sonship". For Coptic Orthodox Christians, neither faith alone nor works alone can save, but both together, are required for salvation.

== Comparison of Catholic, Lutheran and Methodist views ==
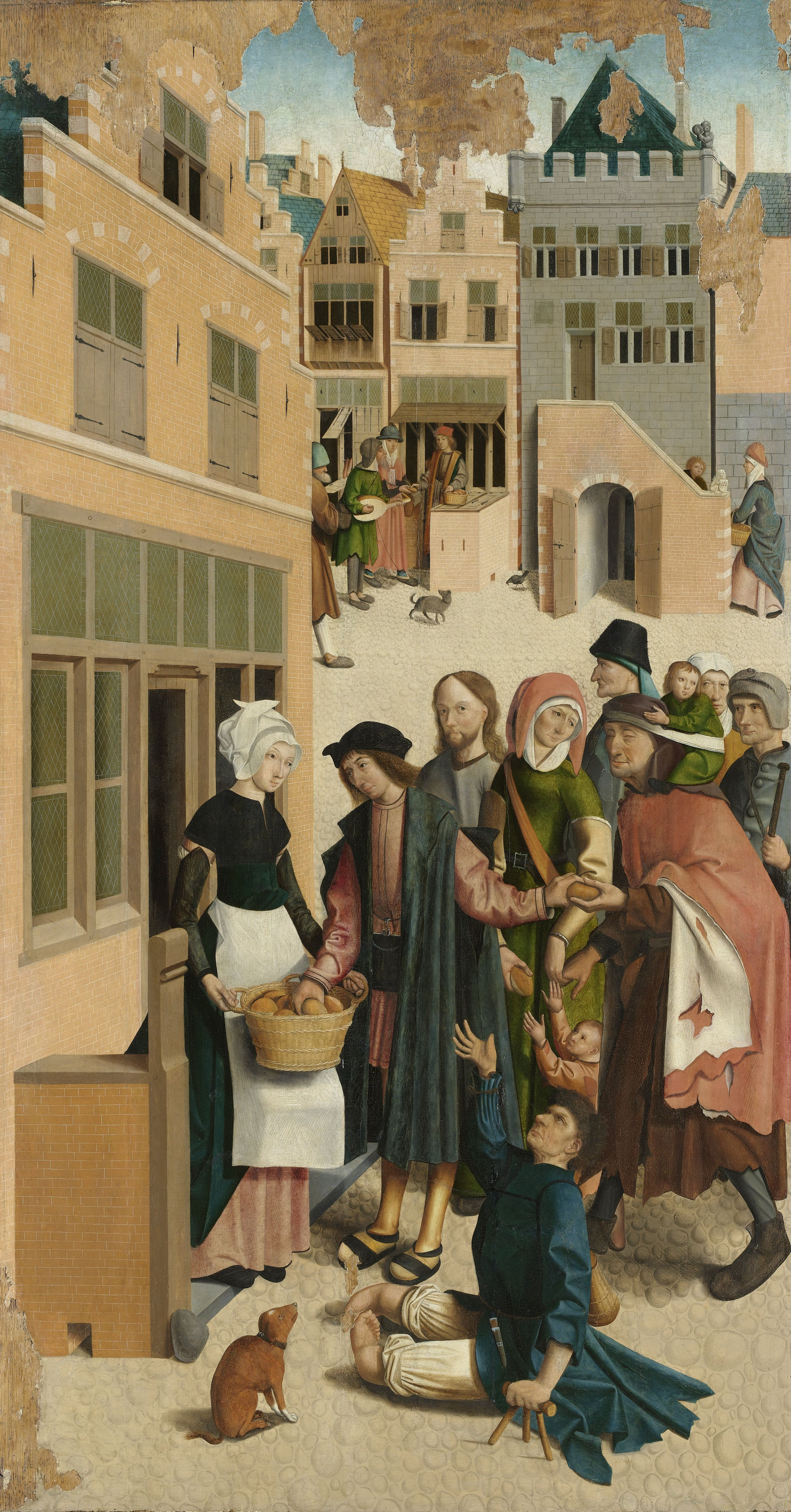
Part of De zeven werken van barmhartigheid (The Seven Works of Charity) by Master of Alkmaar displayed in the Church of Saint Lawrence

Methodist theologian Brian Black compared the Catholic, Lutheran, and Methodist positions on good works as they relate to salvation:

Those of the Methodist tradition accept the ideas of John Wesley that final salvation is dependent upon living a grace enabled holy life after conversion [the New Birth]. Wesleyan theologians insisted that the necessity of continued faith and obedience is not a salvation of works. These works are not done in any way to merit heaven, which is purely a gift from God. It is simply choosing throughout one's life to accept God's gift. They would phrase it differently, but would agree with St. Augustine, who stated, "The faithful...would endanger the salvation of their souls if they acted on the false assurance that faith alone is sufficient for salvation of that they need not perform good works in order to be saved." The "works" Wesleyans insist upon would be repentance, faith, and continued obedience. These concepts are clearly in line with much Reformation thought regarding salvation. The reformers insisted that repentance worked together with faith in salvation and is followed by an obedient life. As Martin Luther stated in his first point of the 95 Theses which began the Protestant Reformation, "When our Lord and Master Jesus Christ said, 'Repent' (Mt 4:17), he willed the entire life of believers to be one of repentance." The major distinction is that Wesley defined sin as a moral choice rather than as an absolute, legal concept [as in the Lutheran view]. Almost all evangelicals agree that there are actions (or works) a sinner must do to become saved. A person must repent, believe in Christ, and testify to being a Christian. (Ac 2:38 and Ro 10:9-10) Repentance is a change of direction in life from following sin to obedience in following the Saviour. A person is then saved as he trusts in Christ as his Saviour and Lord. A continuation of what was necessary to become saved, namely obedience and continued faith, is [in the Methodist view] to remain saved. One must continue to obey Christ as one began in repentance and continue to trust Him for salvation.

== See also ==
- Altruism (ethics)
- Biblical law in Christianity
- Conditional preservation of the saints
- Divine grace
- Fate of the unlearned
- Karma
- Lordship salvation
- Mitzvah
- Works of Mercy
