= Augustin Bader =

16th century Anabaptist leader

Augustin Bader (c. 1495, Augsburg – March 30, 1530, Stuttgart) was an Anabaptist leader and Millennialist.

== Biography ==
Little is known about Augustin Bader's youth and origins. He was probably born in Augsburg shortly before 1500. He was first mentioned as a journeyman weaver in 1516; He was also referred to as a furrier. In 1517 he appears in the records as a homeowner, which indicates he was married.

== Leader of the Augsburg Anabaptists ==
Bader and his wife Sabina were baptized by Jakob Gross in the winter of 1526/27 and joined the Augsburg Anabaptist community. Although he is not mentioned by name, it is likely Bader participated in the Augsburg Martyrs' Synod from August 20 to 24, 1527. On September 15, 1527, the Anabaptist community was raided and Gross, Sabina and Hans Hut were among those arrested.

After this wave of arrests, most leaders of the Augsburg Anabaptists were taken prisoner or banished from the city, so Bader was appointed head of the community at the suggestion of Leonhard Freisleben. However, a few days after his election he was also arrested. Unlike his wife, he formally renounced Anabaptism in order to avoid being expelled from the city. As a result, Bader secretly led a large number of meetings and carried out baptisms for believers.

From spring of 1528 he also held large, open-air meetings outside the city to prepare the Anabaptists for the Last Judgment predicted by Hans Hut to occur at Pentecost 1528. Through Eitelhans Langenmantel, Bader had obtained a copy of Hut's "Mission Booklet" and was thus informed about his apocalyptic teachings and calculation of the end times.

When the Augsburg council launched a second wave of arrests in February 1528, Bader was able to avoid capture through stealth. He moved to Kaufbeuren for a short time to prepare the Anabaptist community there for the end times. When he secretly returned to Augsburg, the community was under the leadership of Georg Nespitzer. Bader and Nespitzer disagreed regarding the end date and to avoid splitting the community, Bader was voted out as leader.

Bader then left the city and went to the Anabaptist community of Esslingen am Neckar. From there he moved to Strasbourg together with his colleagues Gall Vischer and Hans Koeller, who were also expelled from Augsburg.

== Prophet ==
In Strasbourg he met the German Peasants' War preacher Oswald Leber, who, based on the Jewish messianic revelation of Abraham ben Eliezer Halevi, predicted the year 1530 as the date for the return of the Messiah.

Despite this new prediction, Bader returned to Augsburg at Pentecost 1528 to see the fulfillment of Hut's prophecy. When Bader arrived in Augsburg, he found the Anabaptist community almost completely destroyed. At Easter 1528, a 88 Anabaptists were arrested and expelled from the city. More arrests followed. The leader of the community, Hans Leupold, was executed as a deterrent. The remaining Anabaptist leaders agreed on a period of reflection and decided on a moratorium on baptisms.

During this uncertain time, Bader hid in the attic of a sympathizer and waited for new revelations. In July and August, Bader experienced three visions in his hiding place, upon which he based his own doctrine of the "great change" that he believed would occur at Easter 1530. The visions gave him the certainty that he was called to work as a prophet of the dawning end times.

Towards the end of 1528, Bader left Augsburg again and appeared at various Anabaptist meetings, where he spread his visions and tried to find followers for the movement he founded. Via Esslingen am Neckar he went to a meeting on the Schönberg river, near Geroldseck Castle in modern-day Hohengeroldseck in order to reveal himself as a prophet to a group of confidants. He then traveled back to Augsburg and tried to sell his property there in order to create a material basis for his new community.

At the end of 1528, Bader appeared at an Anabaptist meeting in Teufen, Appenzell . At this meeting he openly renounced Anabaptism in accordance with the baptismal ban decided upon in Augsburg. He received a different command from God. After the meeting in Teufen, Bader seems to have taken part in an Anabaptist meeting in Nuremberg in January 1529. Afterwards he disappeared from the record until July 1529.

== King ==
By 1529, Bader, with his wife, three children and a small group of followers had established a commune in the hamlet of Lautern in the Duchy of Württemberg. There, they continued to evolve their theology, fueled by dreams, visions, and reflections on intellectual currents from late medieval and early modern Germany. Some of their views aligned with demands for social justice, which were characteristic of populist preaching during the early Protestant Reformation. Others were influenced by "elite" religious culture, including a fascination with Judaism.

On St. Martin's Day 1529, Bader's other followers and their families arrived in Lautern from Basel to wait together for the "great change" and to convey Hut's teachings about the final judgment to the people in a kind of missionary procession to convey. For the eschatological mission, Bader had costumes specially designed by him made from the community treasury. The preparations also included contacting Jews from Leipheim and Günzburg in order to have them confirm the end times based on kabbalah.

At the end of November, Bader's teaching significantly expanded based on the vision of Vischer. Vischer stated that he had seen in a dream how her house had opened and royal regalia had descended on Bader. Bader interpreted Vischer's dream as a prediction for his future role as king in the thousand-year kingdom and for the royal lineage of his recently born youngest son. As a direct consequence of this vision, Bader and his companions ordered the royal regalia from goldsmiths in Ulm. The insignia included a dagger, a cup and a gold braid as a belt. They then had a sword and a dagger gold-plated. In addition, a small crown, a chain and a scepter were commissioned to be made.

== Martyrdom ==
Bader was not able to fulfill his role as future king for long, as he and his supporters were arrested on January 15, 1530.

Based on the trial files, the arrests, interrogations with torture and executions of the Bader's millenarian group can be reconstructed quite well. However, it is not known who reported the whereabouts of Bader and his Anabaptist community in Stuttgart. After the allegations became known, the authorities sent a representative in mid-January 1530 to arrest the community together with the chief bailiff of Blaubeuren. A total of 15 people (five men, two pregnant women and eight mostly small children) were arrested. The community's possessions, including the royal jewels and regalia were confiscated. Only Sabina Bader was able to avoid arrest by jumping out of a window. The adults were distributed to different prisons and the children were sent to different institutions.

Bader was jailed in Stuttgart, where he was subjected to his first interrogation on January 27, 1530. He freely gave information about his teachings and his calling to be king in the coming thousand-year kingdom. At the same time, the others were questioned. After the first questioning, those arrested were subjected to the torture. The authorities were less interested in Bader's religious motives than in his political views.

In the run-up to the Diet of Augsburg, Bader was portrayed as an agent of the expelled Duke Ulrich of Württemberg. Bader was not primarily accused of heresy, but rather of planned rebellion. On March 10, 1530, Augustin Bader was interrogated for the last time under severe torture. He refused to recant.

Although the authorities were unable to extract a plan from him, he was sentenced to death for rebellion. On March 30, he and his followers were executed for political upheaval in Stuttgart, Tübingen and Nürtingen. Bader was led through the streets of Stuttgart on a cart and pinched with red-hot tongs in each district. On the execution site, the executioner pressed a glowing crown onto his head. He was then beheaded with his own gold-plated sword and afterwards burned at the stake.

== Baptismal line ==
The line of baptismal succession for Augustin Bader (baptized 1526/27) probably goes back to Konrad Grebel (baptized January 1525) via Jakob Gross (baptized Easter 1525), Balthasar Hubmaier (baptized Easter 1525), Wilhelm Reublin (baptized January 1525) and Jörg Blaurock (baptized January 1525).
