= Pilgram Marpeck =

Pilgram Marpeck (also Pilgram Marbeck; c. 1495 – 1556) was an important Anabaptist leader in southern Germany in the 16th century.

== Biography ==
Marpeck was a native of Rattenberg in the County of Tyrol. His father, Heinrich Marpeck, moved from Rosenheim in Bavaria to Rattenberg, Austria, where he served as a city councilman. Heinrich also served as a judge (1494–1502) and mayor (1511). Pilgram attended the Latin school in Rattenberg.

Before his days as an Anabaptist, Pilgram Marpeck enjoyed a good financial status and was a highly respected citizen of Rattenberg on the Inn River. He was a mining engineer, a member of the miners' brotherhood, and served on both Rattenberg's inner and outer councils.

Records of Marpeck's conversion to Anabaptism are not extant. It is known that in his position as a mining magistrate, he was required by Archduke Ferdinand to expose miners in sympathy with the Anabaptist movement. Leonhard Schiemer was executed by authorities two weeks before Marpeck left his mining position on 28 January 1528. It is generally believed that he lost his position because he refused to aid authorities in capturing the Anabaptists. Marpeck was quickly reduced from a prominent citizen of Rattenberg to a "wandering citizen of heaven".

From 1528 to 1532, Marpeck lived in Strasbourg, serving for two years as a timber supervisor, before he was expelled from the city because of his Anabaptist activity. For the next 12 years, he lived a wanderer's life in Switzerland, and traveled to Tyrol, Moravia, South Germany, and Alsace. He is believed to have established Anabaptist congregations in these areas.

In 1544, Pilgram Marpeck was working in the city forest of Augsburg. On 12 May 1545, he was employed as the city engineer, a position he held until his death there in December 1556. His services were evidently in great demand, for, although the city issued reprimands and warnings to desist, Marpeck continued his activities as a minister among the Anabaptists.

In addition to his labors as a pastor and church organizer, Marpeck made other important contributions to the Anabaptists, the chief of which flowed from his pen. Marpeck debated with Martin Bucer and Kaspar Schwenkfeld, but also attacked the incarnation view of Melchior Hoffman, the Münsterite use of force, and the Hutterian community of goods. He held both the Old and New Testaments to be the Word of God, but distinguished the New Testament as the authoritative rule of faith and practice for Christian brethren. Marpeck attributed the German Peasants' War, the Münster Rebellion, Ulrich Zwingli's death, and many of the excesses of the Catholic Church to the failure to make this distinction. Pilgram held a moderate position among Anabaptists, criticizing the positions of both the legalists and the spiritualists. His writings include the Vermanung (a revision of Rothmann's Bekentnisse), the Verantwortung (a reply to Schwenkfeld), and the Testamentserläuterung. William Estep suggests that Marpeck was to South German Anabaptism what Menno Simons was to Dutch Anabaptism.

== Family ==
Pilgram Marpeck married Sophia Harrer, by whom he had one child. After her death, he married a woman named Anna. They had no offspring, but adopted three children.

== Theology ==
Because of his zeal for defending Anabaptism wherever he went by debating and writing, Marpeck was considered an effective teacher by followers and a formidable heretic by opponents. He was similar in a few ways to Hans Denck in his views of following the leading of the Holy Spirit, and he warned others against the legalistic standards others were imposing on baptism, communion, church discipline, and dress codes. At first Marpeck had embraced Lutheranism, but he turned to Anabaptism after realizing the easy justification Luther's theology gave to carnal freedom. He, in contrast with Denck, believed the Holy Scriptures set forth the standards for Christians which included establishing the institution of the church. In accordance with this, Marpeck's theology taught the freedom of Christ and not focusing on outward legalism.

== Recent interest ==
Interest in Marpeck's life and thought have seen a major revival in the late 20th and early 21st centuries. The discovery of the Kunstbuch, a collection of works by Marpeck and his circle, has contributed to this revival. Full-length monographs have considered his hermeneutics (William Klassen), his social thought (Stephen Boyd), his Christology (Neal Blough), and his theological method (Malcolm Yarnell).
