= Visiting the sick =

Philanthropic practice

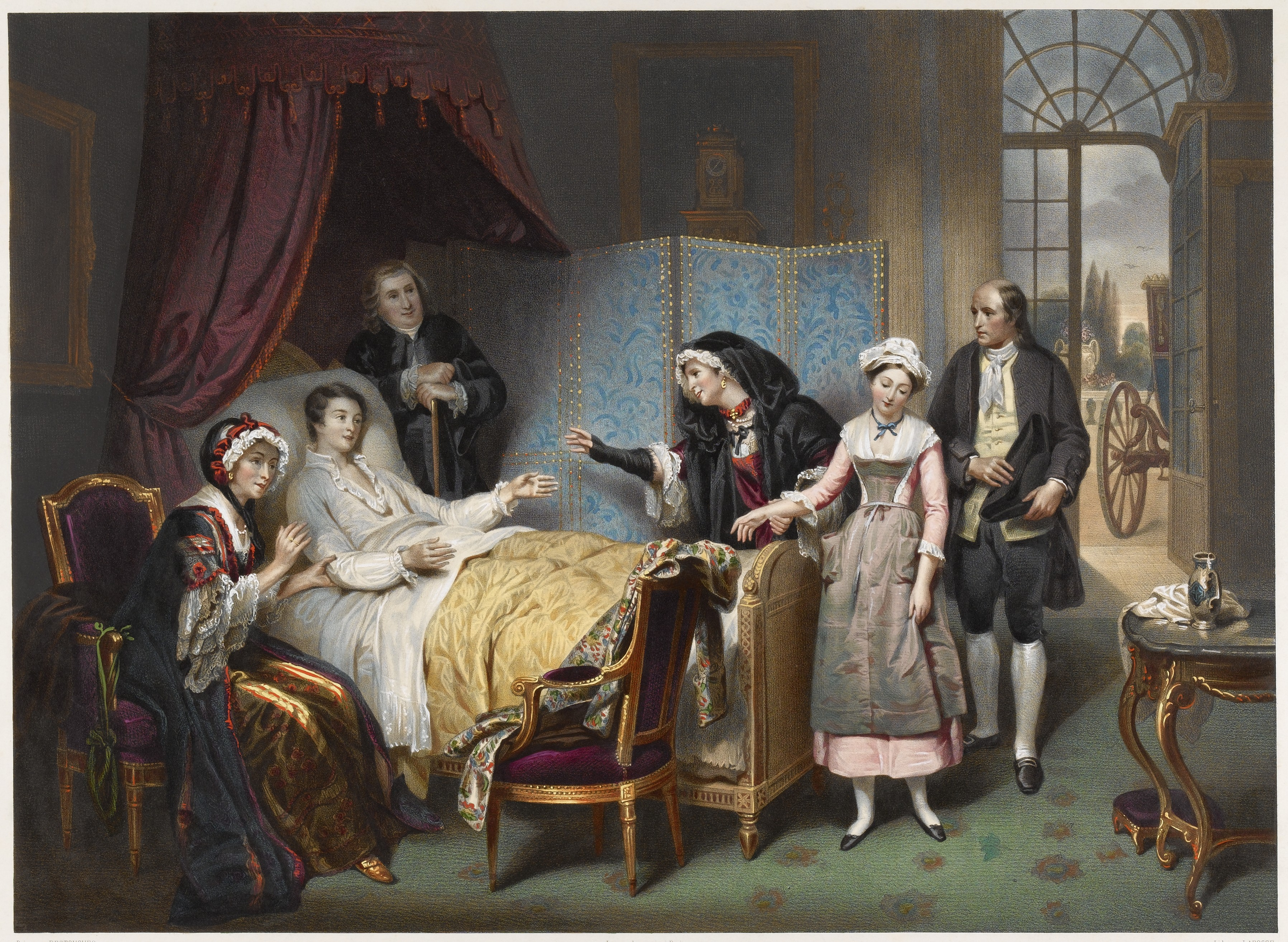
painting of a young woman visiting a sick young man

Visiting the sick, either at hospital or their home, is a recommended philanthropic deed in different cultures and religions, including Christianity, Judaism and Islam and is considered an aspect of benevolence and a work of mercy.

In Judaism, for instance, the act is called bikur cholim and is considered a part of mitzvah (commandment). In Christianity it may be done by relatives or friends or formally by a chaplain or minister.

== Format ==
Visiting the sick is mainly performed on a voluntarily basis. The purpose of the visit is to reflect on shared feeling with the sick person and to spend some warm quality time with them, providing them with inspiration and positive feelings that can help them fight their sickness and get well soon.

== See also ==
- Anointing of the sick
