= Leonhard Schiemer =

Leonhard Schiemer (c. 1500 – 14 January 1528) was an early pacifist Anabaptist writer and martyr whose work survives in the Ausbund.

== Background ==
Schiemer was born around 1500 in Vöcklabruck, where he grew up in a religious environment and trained to be a tailor. He originally wanted to become a Roman Catholic priest but as an adolescent joined the Franciscan monastery in Judenburg. Six years later he left the monastery and arrived at Nürnberg, where he - disappointed with monastic life - returned to tailoring.

== Anabaptist encounters ==
Biographers disagree whether Schiemer first made contact with Anabaptists in Nürnberg. Schiemer may have made arrangements to travel to Nikolsburg in Moravia, where Balthasar Hubmaier was an important Anabaptist leader. Here he witnessed the May 1527 disputation between the Stäbler (shepherd's staff) und Schwertler (sword) Anabaptist groups. While the Stäbler under the leadership of Hans Hut held a position of absolute nonviolence, Hubmeier and the Schwertler professed that Christians were permitted to defend themselves and others with the sword. It is unknown which of these positions Schiemer adopted. Some biographers think he probably adopted Hubmeier’s view, because later in Vienna he was reluctant to accept Hans Hut.

== Conversion ==
Only a few weeks after the Nikolsburg disputation, Leonhard Schiemer went to Vienna. There he again met up with Hans Hut and the Anabaptist congregation at Kärntnerstraße. Within two days, Schiemer was won over to the Anabaptist view and at the same time convinced of the pacifist beliefs of the Stäbler. He was baptized and became a member of the Vienna congregation.

Schiemer immediately began an extensive missionary endeavor. Next he worked a short time in Steyr und Salzburg, taking part in the August 1527 Augsburg Martyrs' Synod and was sent from there as a messenger to Tyrol, where he settled in Rattenberg on the Inn. He joined an existing Anabaptist congregation there, which called him to serve as bishop shortly after his arrival.

== Arrest ==
Within six months of his baptism he had preached in 28 cities, winning more than 200 converts to Anabaptism; he was arrested on 25 November 1527.

Schiemer used the short stay in prison (until January 1528) for composing and publishing a number of works including:

- Was die Gnade sei (What Grace Is)
- Vom Fläschl (Just as a bottle is narrow at the top and wide below, the way to heaven is narrow and difficult … but the Lord comforts those in extreme misery. Suffering is nothing other than the price of eternal life.)
- Von der Taufe im Neuen Testament (About Baptism in the New Testament).
- Ein Bekenntnis vor dem Richter zu Rotenburg (A Confession before the Judge of Rattenburg; January 1528).
- Three Kinds of Grace Found in the Scriptures
- Von der Prob des Geistes, Frag und Antwort, auch Gegenred (The Test of the Spirit, Questions and Answers, Also Counter-Pleas) (a catechism for Anabaptists)

He also wrote an interpretation of the Apostles’ Creed as well as hymns.

Schiermer's writings were widely circulated and after his death. They had a significant influence on the development of Austrian and south German Anabaptism.

== Teachings ==
Schiemer appears to have confirmed the doctrine of the Trinity.

Schiemer separated the outer word of God, the Bible, received through one's ear, from the inner word, the direct word of God, that only a spirit-possessed person is able to hear. The inner word leads to loving God and following Christ, while the outer word is used only to devise external rules and regulations. It makes people merely good citizens, but not devoted and sacrificial followers of Jesus.

The followers of Schiemer also renounced private property. He was fascinated with early Christian communism and taught this as a sign of the true Christian. The Hutterites have made this ideal a principle of their community.

The central message of Schiemer's writing is on the theology of the cross and Passion mysticism of the Late Middle Ages: Christ suffered for the faithful of this world. His theology also appears in the hymns he composed, which have been passed down in the Ausbund, which is still used by descendants of the Anabaptists, the Amish.

== Martyrdom ==
In January 1528, Leonhard Schiemer began looking for a way to escape, but failed. He was arrested again and subsequently handed over to the executioner. After extensive torture he was ultimately beheaded on 14 January 1528 in Rattenberg. Schiemer's martyrdom was not the only in Rattenberg. Between 1528 and 1540 the Roman Catholic authorities ordered the execution of another 70 Anabaptist men and women who testified to their religious beliefs with their blood.

== Significance ==
Leonhard Schiemer is counted - in spite of his short career - as the most important representative of the Anabaptists associated with Hans Hut.

Despite his intellectual relationship with Hut, Schiemer remained an independent thinker. He deemphasized the apocalyptic teachings of Hut, promoting the ideal community, which is prepared for suffering and sacrifice in this world and consciously renounces the use of power and force. His ideas can be found in avant-garde and modern pacifist movements.
