= Hans Hut =

German Anabaptist

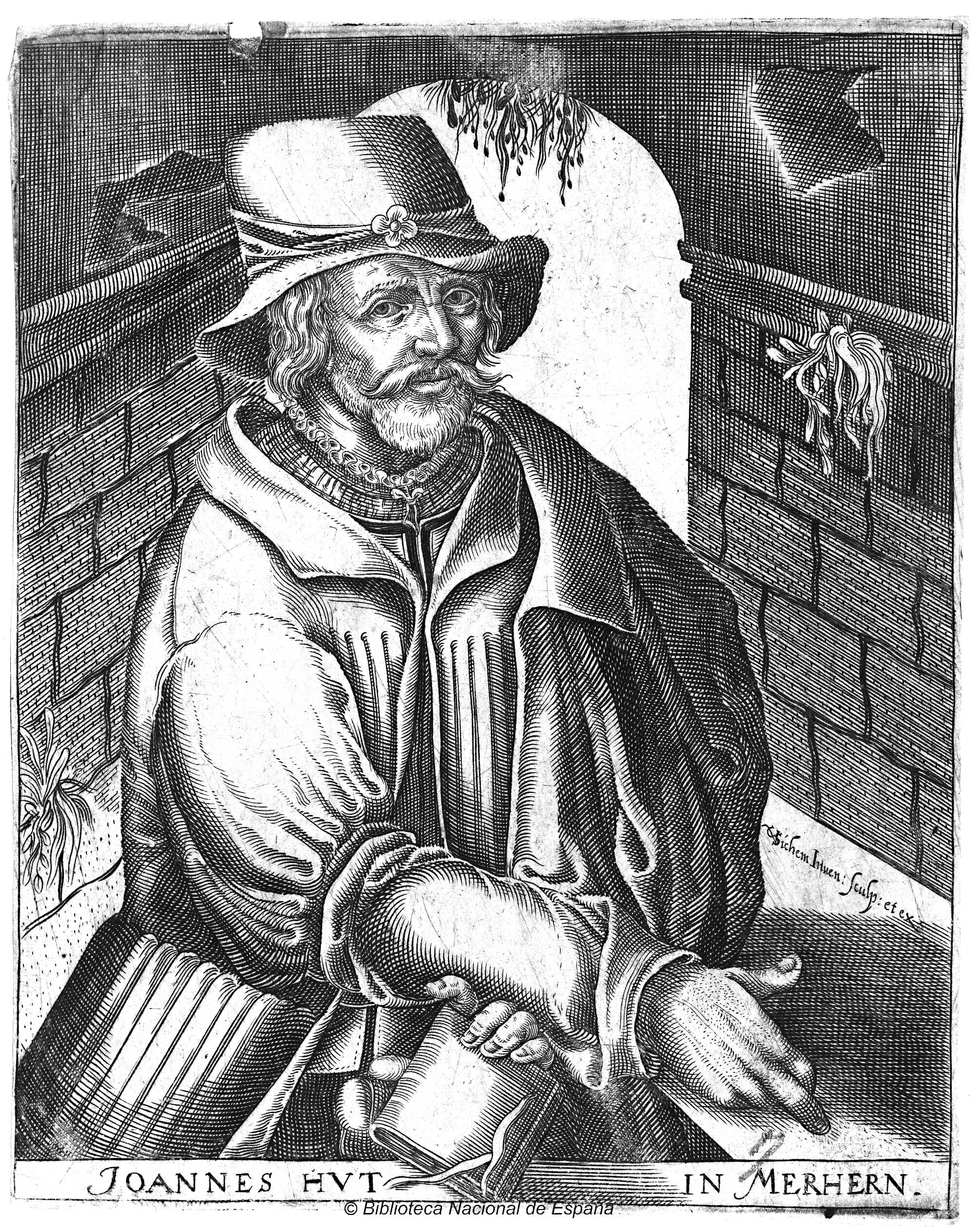
Hans Hut

Hans Hut (/hʌt/; German: [huːt]; c. 1490 – 6 December 1527) was a very active Anabaptist in southern Germany and Austria.

== Life ==
Hut was born in Haina near Römhild, in the Electorate of Saxony (now Thuringia), and became a travelling bookseller. Hut was for some years sacristan in Bibra to the knight Hans von Bibra (the brother of Bishop Lorenz von Bibra). He early came under the influence of Thomas Müntzer and, refusing to have his child baptized, was driven from the community in 1524. He took part in the decisive battle of Thuringia during the German Peasants' War on 15 May 1525 at Bad Frankenhausen. About a week later at Bibra, Hut preached "subjects should murder all the authorities, for the opportune time has arrived." In his later years Hut distanced himself from Müntzer, saying that he (himself) "had clearly erred" and that he "had not understood him (Müntzer)." After the battle he managed to flee and traveled throughout the region.

On Pentecost 1526 he was baptized in Augsburg by Hans Denck, who had previously been baptized by Balthasar Hubmaier. Some feel that Hut and Denck taught universal salvation, but others question whether this was so. He expected the 1528 coming of the Kingdom of God in the form of a violent apocalyptic imposition of the rule of Christ. For this reason, he curtailed his extensive missionary activity to await Pentecost 1528 and be among the 144,000 elect. In addition to baptizing with water, he sealed the baptism with a sign of the cross on the forehead.

His mission activity extended from the Thuringian-French border in the north to Tyrol and Moravia and in his mission journeys he often seemed to seek former Peasants' War participants. His preaching was strongly influenced by Thomas Muentzer's mysticism. Gottfried Sebaß, an expert on Hut's life and theology, calls him simply "Muentzer's heir." Among those influenced by Hut were Augustin Bader.

In May 1527, Hans Schlaffer and others joined Hut in a notable theological controversy taking place in Mikulov (Czech) (in German Nikolsburg), in Moravia, present day Czech Republic. Unfortunately, the exact subject of the debate has been lost to history, but it may have involved the question of whether or not a committed Christian could hold a job, e.g. as a soldier, in which he would be required to use violence. In August 1527 Hans Hut was a key participant at the Martyrs' Synod in Augsburg, a gathering of 60 Anabaptists from the surrounding region, trying to come to a common understanding about various teachings. When the Augsburg town council learned of the meeting, they attempted to arrest the group. Hut was arrested along with the major Augsburg Anabaptists. Though the arrest did not end Hut's teaching, after a trial he and the others were sentenced to indefinite imprisonment. Hut was tortured horribly and accidentally died as a result of a fire that caused his asphyxiation in the Augsburg prison on 6 December 1527. The next day, the authorities sentenced his dead body to death and burned him.

Hut is the author of Ausbund no. 8, “O Thou Almighty Lord and God” (O Allmächtiger Herr Gott), which is still in the hymnal used today by North American Amish congregations.

== Works ==
- Von dem geheimnis der tauf, baide des zaichens und des Wesens, ein anfang eines rechten wahrhaftigen christlichen Lebens (1527)
- Ein christlicher Underricht, wie göttliche geschrift vergleicht und geurtailt solle werden. Aus kraft des heiligen geists und zeuknus der dreitail christlichen Glaubens sambt iren verstand (1527)
