= Hans Schlaffer =

German priest

Hans Schlaffer (died 4 February 1528, Schwaz, County of Tyrol) was a former Catholic priest, who became an Anabaptist in 1526.

In May 1527, Schlaffer was part of the group surrounding Hans Hut, and therefore involved in a notable theological controversy taking place in Nikolsburg, Moravia. Unfortunately, the exact subject of the debate has been lost to history, but it may have involved the question of whether or not a committed Christian could hold a job, e.g. as a soldier, in which he would be required to use violence. He was arrested in 1528, along with fellow Anabaptist Leonard Fryk, brought to Schwaz, and questioned regarding his heretical views regarding the inappropriacy of infant baptism as practiced by Catholics. He refused to recant and was subsequently burnt.
