= Irish Americans =

Americans of Irish birth or descent

Gael-Mheiriceánaigh (Irish)
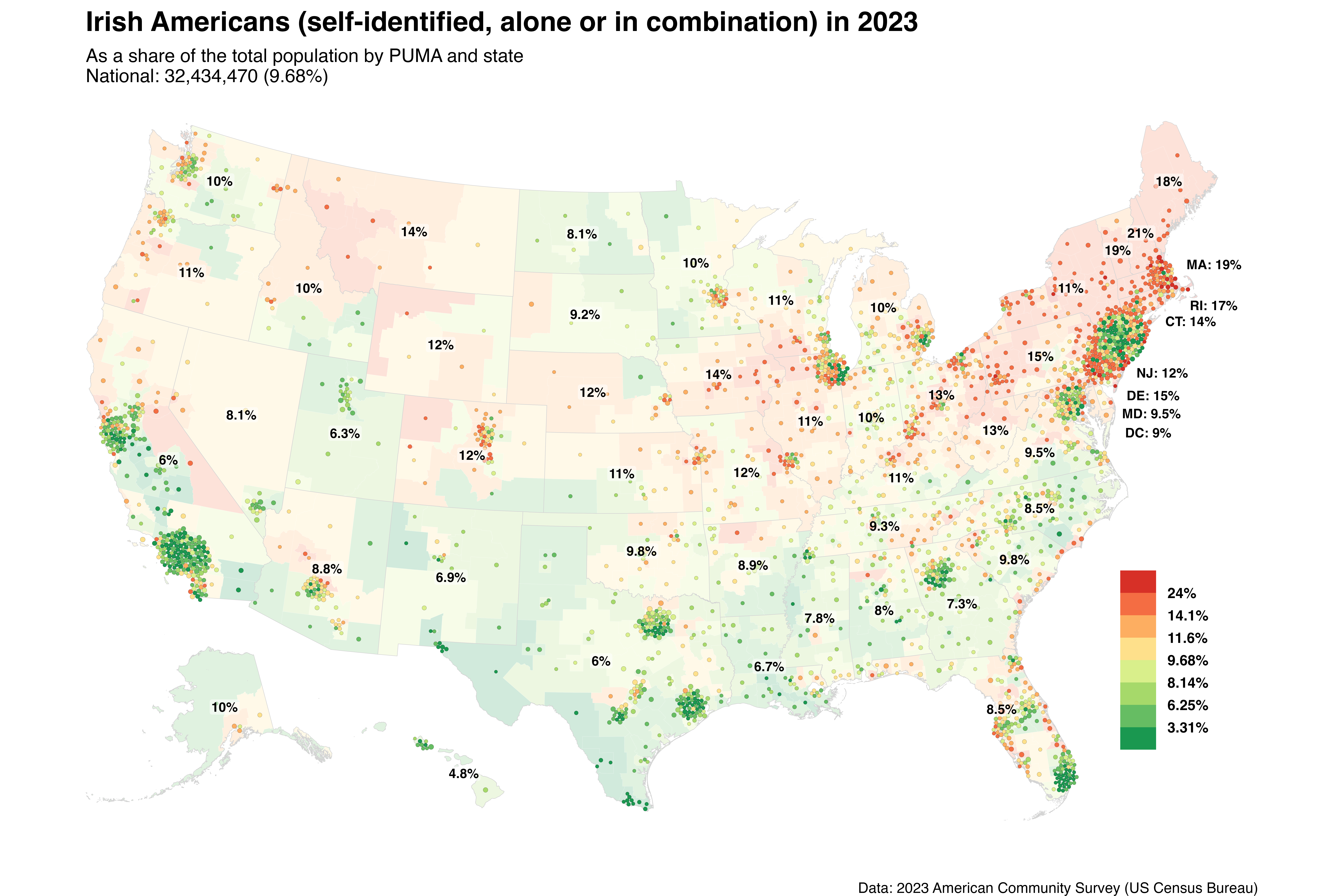
- Irish Americans, % of population by PUMA and state

Total population
- 10,909,542 3.2% Claim full Irish ancestry 38,597,428 11.6% Claim full or partial Irish ancestry (2020 census)

Regions with significant populations
- Significant populations in most urban areas of the United States, but particularly New England (Boston • Rhode Island • New Hampshire • Middlesex • Worcester) • New York (New York City • Long Island • Upstate New York) • Pennsylvania (Philadelphia • Pittsburgh • Philadelphia metropolitan area • Scranton • Coal Region) • Midwestern United States (Chicago • Cleveland • Detroit • Milwaukee • Columbus) • California (Southern California • San Francisco) • Texas (Houston • DFW Area) • Florida • Baltimore • Delaware • DC Beltway • Phoenix • Seattle • Omaha • Savannah, Georgia • Denver

Languages
- Majority English (American English dialects); minority Irish, Shelta

Religion
- Catholicism and Protestantism

Related ethnic groups
- Other Irish • Anglo-Irish • Irish-Traveller Americans • Scotch-Irish Americans • Irish Catholics • Irish Jews • Scottish Americans • Ulster Protestants • Manx Americans • English Americans • Cornish Americans • Welsh Americans • British Americans • Breton Americans • French Americans • Icelandic Americans • Faroese Americans • Spanish Americans • Portuguese Americans • Basque Americans • Galician Americans

Number of Irish Americans
Year	Number
1980	40,165,702
1990	38,735,539
2000	30,528,492
2010	34,670,009
2020	38,597,428

Irish Americans (Irish: Gael-Mheiriceánaigh, pronounced [ɡeːlˠ ˈvʲɛɾʲəcɑːnˠi]) are Americans who have full or partial Irish ancestry or citizenship.

== Irish immigration to the United States ==
=== From the 17th century to the mid-19th century ===
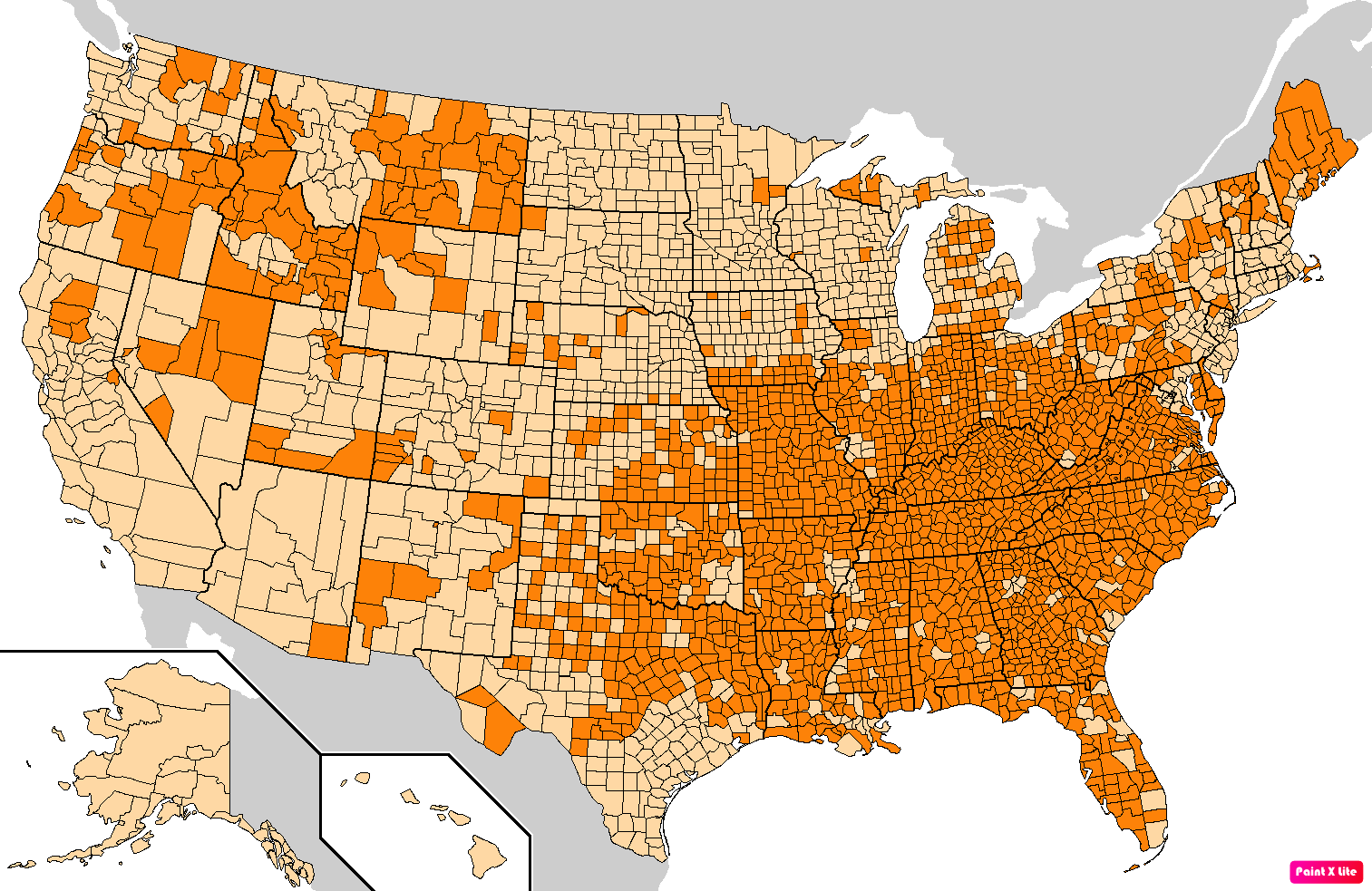
U.S. counties by the percentage of their population self-identifying Scotch-Irish or American ancestry according to the U.S. Census Bureau American Community Survey 2013–2017 5-Year Estimates. Counties where Scotch-Irish and American ancestry combined are greater than the United States as a whole are in full orange.

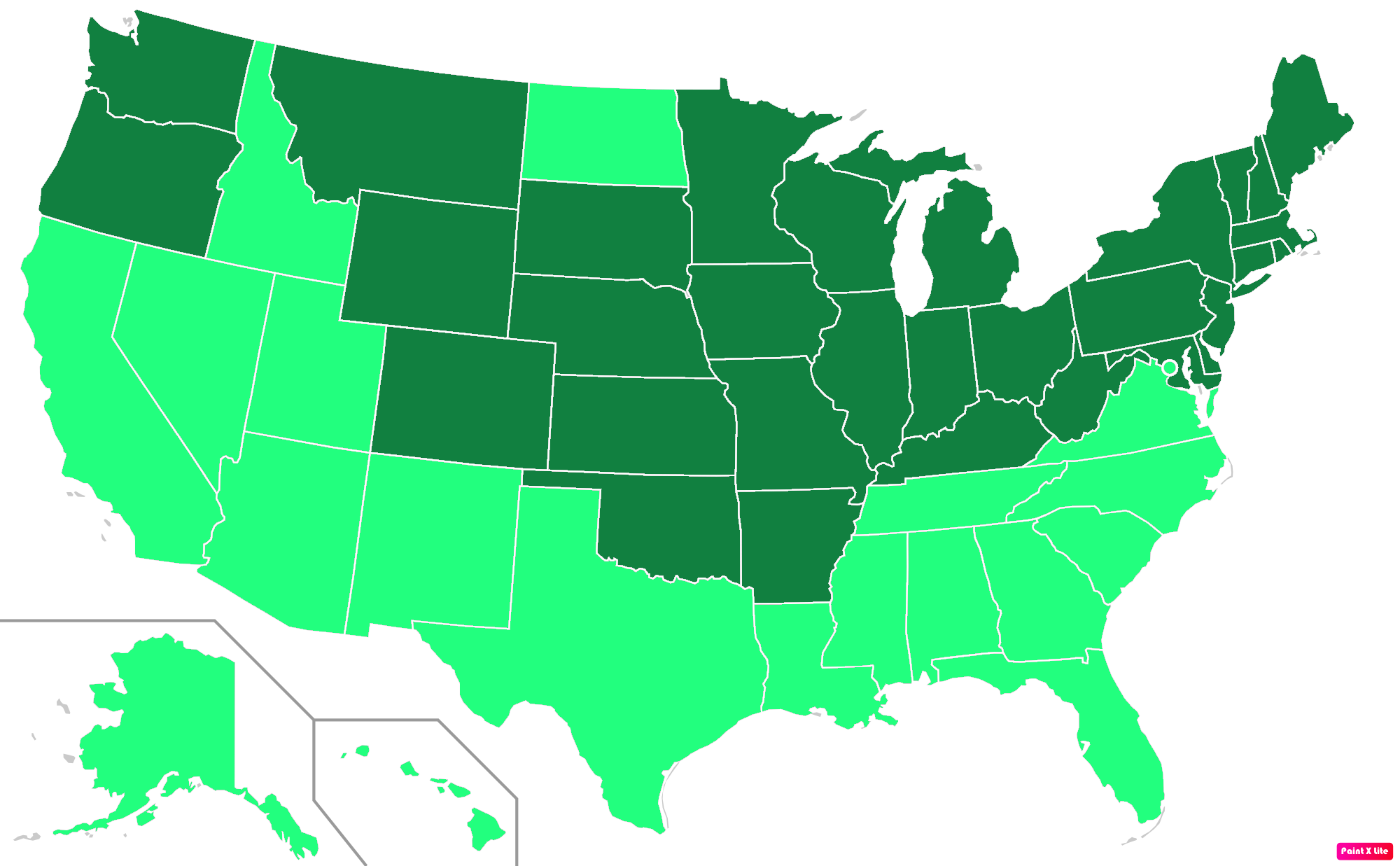
U.S. states by the percentage of their population self-identifying Irish ancestry according to the U.S. Census Bureau. States where Irish ancestry is greater than the United States as a whole are in full green.

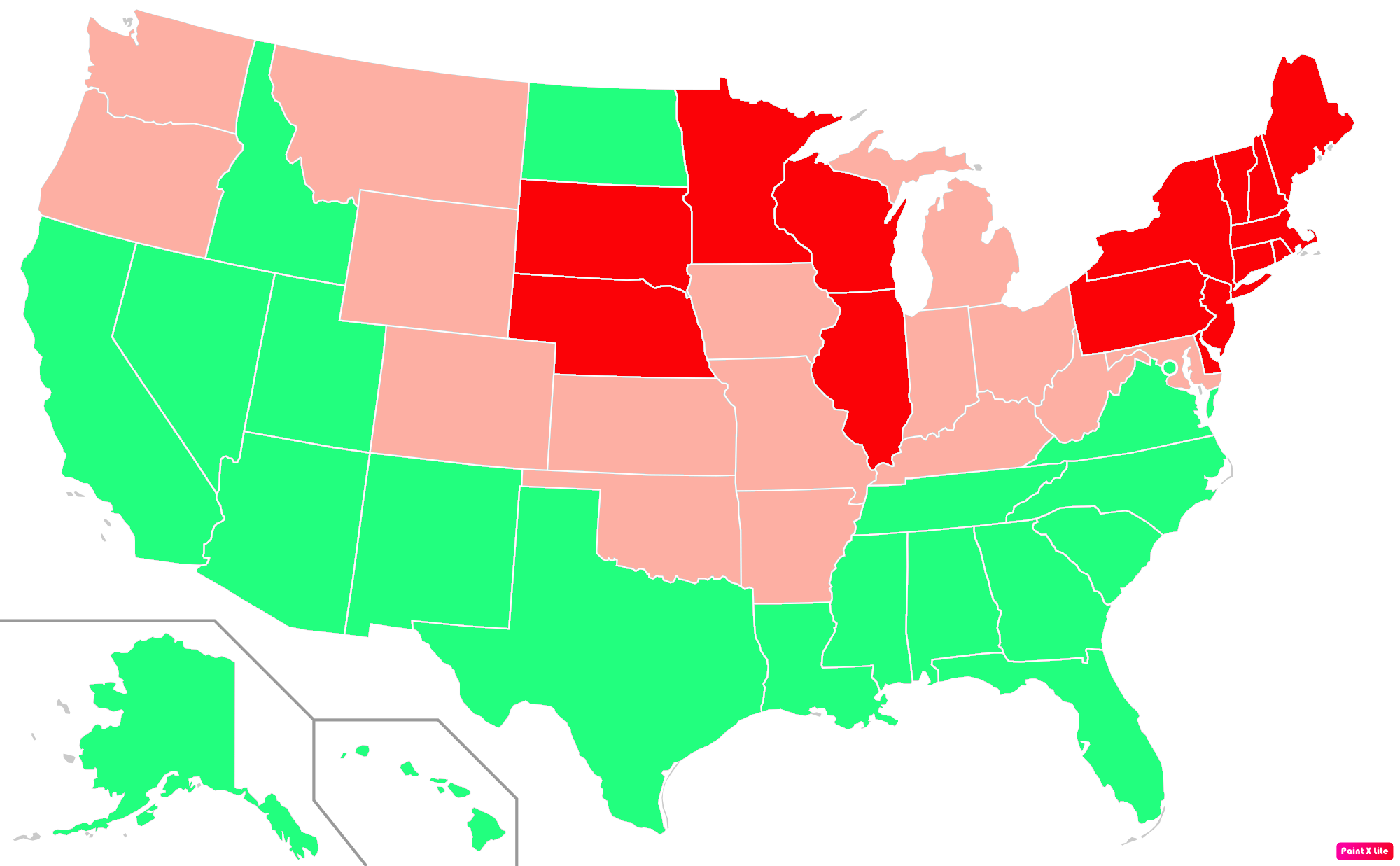
U.S. states where self-identified Irish Americans are overrepresented by the percentage of self-identified Catholics according to the Pew Research Center. States where the percentage of Catholics is greater than the United States as a whole are in full red.

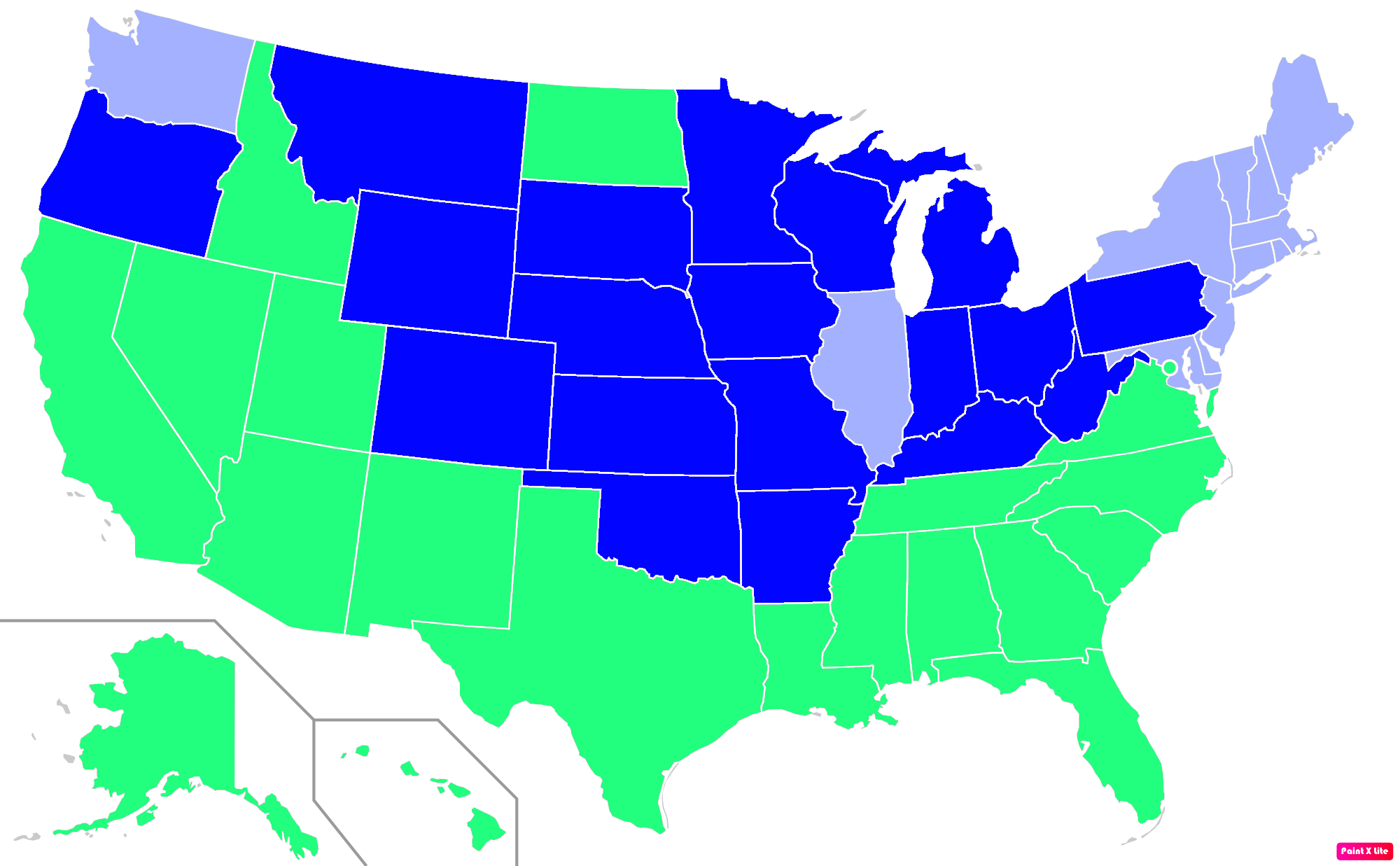
U.S. states where self-identified Irish Americans are over-represented by the percentage of self-identified Protestants (Evangelical or Mainline), according to the Pew Research Center. States where the percentage of Protestants is greater than the United States as a whole are in full blue.

Some of the first Irish people to travel to the New World did so as members of the Spanish garrison in Florida during the 1500s. Irish colonists were involved in efforts to establish colonies in the Amazon region, in Newfoundland, and in Virginia between 1604 and the 1630s. According to historian Donald Akenson, there were "few if any" Irish forcibly transported to the Americas during this period.

Irish immigration to the Americas was the result of a series of complex causes. The Tudor conquest and subsequent colonization by English and Scots people during the 16th and 17th centuries had led to widespread social upheaval in Ireland. Many Irish people tried to seek a better life elsewhere.

At the time European colonies were being founded in the Americas, offering destinations for emigration. Most Irish immigrants to the Americas traveled as indentured servants, with their passage paid for a wealthier person to whom they owed labor for a period of time. Some were merchants and landowners, who served as key players in a variety of different mercantile and colonizing enterprises.

In the 1620s significant numbers of Irish laborers began traveling to English colonies such as Virginia on the continent, and the Leeward Islands and Barbados in the Caribbean region.

Half of the Irish immigrants to the United States in its colonial era (1607–1775) came from the Irish province of Ulster and were largely Protestant, while the other half came from the other three provinces (Leinster, Munster, and Connacht).

In the 17th century, immigration from Ireland to the Thirteen Colonies was minimal, confined mostly to male Irish indentured servants who were primarily Catholic and peaked with 8,000 prisoner-of-war penal transports to the Chesapeake Colonies from the Cromwellian conquest of Ireland in the 1650s (out of a total of approximately 10,000 Catholic immigrants from Ireland to the United States prior to the American Revolutionary War in 1775).

Indentured servitude in British America emerged in part due to the high cost of passage across the Atlantic Ocean. Indentured servants followed their patrons to the latter's choice of colonies as destinations.

While the Colony of Virginia established the Anglican Church as the official religion, and passed laws prohibiting the free exercise of Catholicism during the colonial period, the General Assembly of the Province of Maryland enacted laws in 1639 protecting freedom of religion (following the instructions of a 1632 letter from Cecil Calvert, 2nd Baron Baltimore to his brother Leonard Calvert, the 1st Proprietary-Governor of Maryland). The Maryland General Assembly later passed the 1649 Maryland Toleration Act explicitly guaranteeing those privileges for Catholics.

Like the rest of the indentured servant population (who were mostly men) in the Chesapeake Colonies at the time, 40 to 50 percent died before completing their contracts. Conditions were harsh and the Tidewater region had a highly malignant disease environment, with mosquitoes spreading disease. Most of the men did not establish families and died childless because the population of the Chesapeake Colonies, like the Thirteen Colonies in the aggregate, was not sex-balanced until the 18th century. Three-quarters of the immigrants to the Chesapeake Colonies were male (and in some periods, 4:1 or 6:1 male-to-female) and fewer than 1 percent were over the age of 35. As a consequence, the population grew only because of sustained immigration rather than natural increase. Many of those who survived their indentured servitude contracts left the region.

In 1650, all five Catholic churches with regular services in the eight British American colonies were located in Maryland.

The Province of Carolina did not restrict suffrage (the right to vote) to members of the established Anglican church. In contrast to 17th century Maryland, the New England colonies had a variety of policies. Plymouth, Massachusetts Bay and Connecticut Colonies restricted suffrage to members of the established Puritan church. The Colony of Rhode Island and Providence Plantations had no established church, while the former New Netherland colonies (New York, New Jersey, and Delaware) had no established church under the Duke's Laws. The Frame of Government in William Penn's 1682 land grant established free exercise of religion for all Christians in the Province of Pennsylvania.

Following the Glorious Revolution (1688–1689), colonial governments disenfranchised Catholics in Maryland, New York, Rhode Island, Carolina, and Virginia. In Maryland, suffrage was restored in 1702.

In 1692, the Maryland General Assembly had established the Church of England as the official state church. In 1698 and 1699, Maryland, Virginia, and Carolina passed laws specifically limiting immigration of Irish Catholic indentured servants. In 1700, the estimated population of Maryland was 29,600, about 2,500 of whom were Catholic.

In the 18th century, emigration from Ireland to the Thirteen Colonies shifted from being primarily Catholic to being primarily Protestant. With the exception of the 1790s, it would remain so until the mid-to-late 1830s, with Presbyterians constituting the absolute majority until 1835. These Protestant immigrants were principally descended from Scottish and English pastoralists and colonial administrators (often from the South/Lowlands of Scotland and the bordering North of England) who had in the previous century settled the Plantations of Ireland, the largest of which was the Plantation of Ulster. By the late 18th century, these Protestant immigrants primarily migrated as families rather than as individuals. Most of these Irish Protestants were Ulster Protestants. During the first half of the 18th century, 15,000 Ulster Protestants emigrated to North America, with another 25,000 during the period 1751 to 1775. The reasons for their emigration consisted mainly of: bad harvests, landlords increasing rents as leases fell through, and agrarian violence by Protestant gangs such as the "Hearts of Steel", also known as the "Steelboys", before the American revolution cut off further emigration.

In 1704, the Maryland General Assembly passed a law that banned the Jesuits from proselytizing, or baptizing children other than those with Catholic parents, and publicly conducting Catholic Mass. Two months after its passage, the General Assembly modified the legislation to allow Mass to be privately conducted for an 18-month period. In 1707, the General Assembly passed a law which permanently allowed Mass to be privately conducted. During this period, the General Assembly also began levying taxes on the passage of Irish Catholic indentured servants. In 1718, the General Assembly required a religious test for voting that resumed disenfranchisement of Catholics.

However, lax enforcement of laws in Maryland enabled churches on Jesuit-operated farms and plantations to serve growing populations and become stable parishes.

In 1750, of the 30 Catholic churches with regular services in the Thirteen Colonies, 15 were located in Maryland, 11 in Pennsylvania, and 4 in the former New Netherland colonies. By 1756, the number of Catholics in Maryland had increased to approximately 7,000, which increased further to 20,000 by 1765. In Pennsylvania, there were approximately 3,000 Catholics in 1756 and 6,000 by 1765 (the large majority of the Pennsylvania Catholic population was from provinces of southern Germany).

From 1717 to 1775, though scholarly estimates vary, the most common approximation is that 250,000 immigrants from Ireland emigrated to the Thirteen Colonies. By the beginning of the American Revolutionary War in 1775, approximately only 2 to 3 percent of the colonial labor force was composed of indentured servants, and of those arriving from Britain from 1773 to 1776, fewer than 5 percent were from Ireland (while 85 percent remained male and 72 percent went to the Southern Colonies). Immigration during the war came to a standstill except by 5,000 German mercenaries from Hesse who remained in the country following the war. Out of the 115 killed at the Battle of Bunker Hill, 22 were Irish-born. Their names include Callaghan, Casey, Collins, Connelly, Dillon, Donohue, Flynn, McGrath, Nugent, Shannon, and Sullivan.

By the end of the war in 1783, there were approximately 24,000 to 25,000 Catholics in the United States (including 3,000 slaves) out of a total population of approximately 3 million (or less than 1 percent). The majority of the Catholic population in the United States during the colonial period came from England, Germany, and France, not Ireland. Irish historiographers tried and failed to demonstrate Irish Catholics were more numerous in the colonial period than previous scholarship had indicated. By 1790, approximately 400,000 people of Irish birth or ancestry lived in the United States (or greater than 10 percent of the total population of approximately 3.9 million). The U.S. Bureau of the Census estimates 2% of the United States population in 1776 was of native Irish heritage. The Catholic population grew to approximately 50,000 by 1800 (or less than 1 percent of the total population of approximately 5.3 million) due to increased Catholic emigration from Ireland during the 1790s.

In the 18th century Thirteen Colonies and the independent United States, while interethnic marriage among Catholics remained a dominant pattern, Catholic-Protestant intermarriage became more common (notably in the Shenandoah Valley where intermarriage among Ulster Protestants and the significant minority of Irish Catholics in particular was not uncommon or stigmatized). While fewer Catholic parents required that their children be disinherited in their wills if they renounced Catholicism, compared to the rest of the US population, this response was more common among Catholic parents that Protestants.

Despite such constraints, many Irish Catholics who immigrated to the United States from 1770 to 1830 converted to Baptist and Methodist churches during the Second Great Awakening (1790–1840).

Between the end of the American Revolutionary War in 1783 and the War of 1812, 100,000 immigrants came from Ulster to the United States. During the French Revolutionary Wars (1792–1802) and Napoleonic Wars (1803–1815), there was a 22-year economic expansion in Ireland due to increased need for agricultural products for British soldiers and an expanding population in England. Following the conclusion of the War of the Seventh Coalition and Napoleon's exile to Saint Helena in 1815, there was a six-year international economic depression that led to plummeting grain prices and a cropland rent spike in Ireland.

From 1815 to 1845, 500,000 more Irish Protestant immigrants came from Ireland to the United States, as part of a migration of approximately 1 million immigrants from Ireland from 1820 to 1845. In 1820, following the Louisiana Purchase in 1804 and the Adams–Onís Treaty in 1819, and acquisition of territories formerly controlled by Catholic European nations, the Catholic population of the United States had grown to 195,000 (or approximately 2 percent of the total population of approximately 9.6 million). By 1840, along with resumed immigration from Germany by the 1820s, the Catholic population grew to 663,000 (or approximately 4 percent out of the total population of 17.1 million). Following the potato blight in late 1845 that initiated the Great Famine in Ireland, from 1846 to 1851, more than 1 million more Irish immigrated to the United States, 90 percent of whom were Catholic.

From 1800 to 1844, Irish emigrants were mainly skilled and economically sufficient Ulster Protestants, including artisans, tradesmen and professionals, and farmers. The Famine and the threat of starvation amongst the Irish Catholic population broke down the psychological barriers that had discouraged them from making the passage to America before. After the second potato blight in 1846, panic over the need to escape their difficult situation in Ireland led many to the belief that "anywhere is better than here". Irish Catholics traveled to England, Canada, and America for new lives. Irish immigration increased dramatically during the period 1845–1849, as ships started transporting Irish emigrants during the autumn and winter periods to meet the demand.

Many of the Famine immigrants to New York City were required quarantine on Staten Island or Blackwell's Island. Weakened by famine and diseases of the poor, who suffered lack of sanitation and crowded shipboard conditions, thousands died from typhoid fever or cholera for reasons directly or indirectly related to the Famine. Doctors did not know how to treat or prevent these.

Despite the small increase in Catholic-Protestant intermarriage following the American Revolutionary War, Catholic-Protestant intermarriage remained uncommon in the United States in the 19th century.

==== "Scotch-Irish" ====
Historians have characterized the etymology of the term "Scotch-Irish" as obscure. The term itself is misleading and confusing to the extent that even its usage by authors in historic works of literature about the Scotch-Irish (such as The Mind of the South by W. J. Cash) is often incorrect. Historians David Hackett Fischer and James G. Leyburn note that usage of the term is unique to North American English and it is rarely used by British historians, or in Ireland or Scotland, where Scots-Irish is a term used by Irish Scottish people to describe themselves. The first recorded usage of the term was by Elizabeth I of England in 1573 in reference to Gaelic-speaking Scottish Highlanders who crossed the Irish Sea and intermarried with the Irish Catholic natives of Ireland.

While Protestant immigrants from Ireland in the 18th century were more commonly identified as "Anglo-Irish," and while some preferred to self-identify as "Anglo-Irish," usage of "Scotch-Irish" in reference to Ulster Protestants who immigrated to the United States in the 18th century likely became common among Episcopalians and Quakers in Pennsylvania, where numerous of these immigrants entered through Philadelphia. Records show that usage of the term with this meaning was made as early as 1757 by Anglo-Irish philosopher Edmund Burke.

However, multiple historians have noted that from the time of the American Revolutionary War until 1850, the term largely fell out of usage, because most Ulster Protestants identified as "Irish" until large waves of immigration by Irish Catholics both during and after the 1840s Great Famine in Ireland led those Ulster Protestants in America who lived in proximity to the new immigrants to change their self-identification to "Scotch-Irish," Those Ulster Protestants who did not live in proximity to Irish Catholics continued to self-identify as "Irish" or, as time went on, began to identify as being of "American ancestry."

While those historians note that renewed usage of "Scotch-Irish" after 1850 was motivated by anti-Catholic prejudices among Ulster Protestants, considering the historically low rates of intermarriage between Protestants and Catholics in both Ireland and the United States, as well as the relative frequency of interethnic and interdenominational marriage amongst Protestants in Ulster, and despite the fact that not all Protestant migrants from Ireland historically were of Scottish descent, James G. Leyburn argued for retaining its usage for reasons of utility and preciseness, while historian Wayland F. Dunaway also argued for retention for historical precedent and linguistic description.

During the colonial period, Irish Protestant immigrants settled in the southern Appalachian backcountry and in the Carolina Piedmont. They became the primary cultural group in these areas, and their descendants were in the vanguard of westward movement through Virginia into Tennessee and Kentucky, and thence into Arkansas, Missouri and Texas. By the 19th century, through intermarriage with settlers of English and German ancestry, their descendants lost their identification with Ireland. "This generation of pioneers...was a generation of Americans, not of Englishmen or Germans or Scots-Irish." The two groups had little initial interaction in America, as the 18th-century Ulster immigrants were predominantly Protestant and had become settled largely in upland regions of the American interior, while the huge wave of 19th-century Catholic immigrant families settled primarily in the Northeast and Midwest port cities such as Boston, Philadelphia, New York, Buffalo, or Chicago. However, beginning in the early 19th century, many Irish migrated individually to the interior for work on large-scale infrastructure projects such as canals and, later in the century, railroads.

The Irish Protestants settled mainly in the colonial "back country" of the Appalachian Mountain region, and became the prominent ethnic strain in the culture that developed there. The descendants of Irish Protestant settlers had a great influence on the later culture of the Southern United States in particular and the culture of the United States in general through such contributions as American folk music, country and western music, and stock car racing, which became popular throughout the country in the late 20th century.

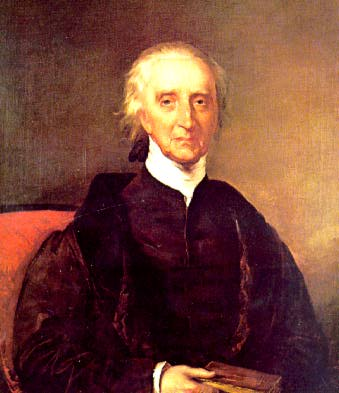
Charles Carroll, the sole Catholic signer of the U.S. Declaration of Independence, was the descendant of Irish nobility in County Tipperary. Signers Matthew Thornton, George Taylor were born in Ireland and were "Ulster" Scots, while Thomas Lynch Jr., for example, was Protestant; he was of Irish ancestry and retained a strong Irish identity.

Irish immigrants of this period participated in significant numbers in the American Revolution, leading one British Army officer to testify at the House of Commons that "half the rebels (referring to soldiers in the Continental Army) were from Ireland and that half of them spoke Irish." Irish Americans - Charles Carroll, Daniel Carroll, Thomas Lynch Jr., James Duane, Cornelius Harnett, and several more signed the foundational documents of the United States—the Declaration of Independence and the Constitution—and, beginning with Andrew Jackson, served as president.

==== 1790 population of Irish origin by state ====
Estimated Irish American population in the Continental United States as of the 1790 Census.

A 1932 report conducted by the American Council of Learned Societies, in collaboration with the United States Census Bureau, concluded that around 6.3% of the White population was of native Irish descent - separate from those of Anglo-Irish and Scots-Irish descent - by determining ancestry based on distinctly native Irish surnames (such as Murphy, Sullivan and Doherty, for example).

It has been noted by several historians - in particular Kerby A. Miller - that a significant portion, if not the vast majority, of native Irish Americans belonged to the Protestant faith, having converted prior to or after settling in the Thirteen Colonies.

State or Territory
State or Territory	Ireland				(Ireland) Irish Total	
State or Territory	Ulster		(Irish Free State) Free State		(Ireland) Irish Total	
State or Territory	#	%	#	%	#	%
Connecticut	4,180	1.80%	2,555	1.10%	6,735	2.90%
Delaware	2,918	6.30%	2,501	5.40%	5,419	11.70%
Georgia	6,082	11.50%	2,010	3.80%	8,092	15.30%
Kentucky & (Tennessee) Tenn.	6,513	7.00%	4,838	5.20%	11,351	12.20%
Maine	7,689	8.00%	3,556	3.70%	11,245	11.70%
Maryland	12,102	5.80%	13,562	6.50%	25,664	12.30%
Massachusetts	9,703	2.60%	4,851	1.30%	14,554	3.90%
New Hampshire	6,491	4.60%	4,092	2.90%	10,583	7.50%
New Jersey	10,707	6.30%	5,439	3.20%	16,146	9.50%
New York	16,033	5.10%	9,431	3.00%	25,464	8.10%
North Carolina	16,483	5.70%	15,616	5.40%	32,099	11.10%
Pennsylvania	46,571	11.00%	14,818	3.50%	61,389	14.50%
Rhode Island	1,293	2.00%	517	0.80%	1,810	2.80%
South Carolina	13,177	9.40%	6,168	4.40%	19,345	13.80%
Vermont	2,722	3.20%	1,616	1.90%	4,338	5.10%
Virginia	27,411	6.20%	24,316	5.50%	51,727	11.70%
(Thirteen Colonies) 1790 Census Area	190,075	5.99%	115,886	3.65%	305,961	9.64%
(Ohio) Northwest Territory	307	2.92%	190	1.81%	497	4.73%
(New France) French America	220	1.10%	135	0.68%	355	1.78%
(Spanish Empire) Spanish America	60	0.25%	37	0.15%	97	0.40%
United States	190,662	5.91%	116,248	3.60%	306,910	9.51%

==== Irish Catholics in the South ====
In 1820 Irish-born John England became the first Catholic bishop in the mainly Protestant city of Charleston, South Carolina. During the 1820s and 1830s, Bishop England defended the Catholic minority against Protestant prejudices. In 1831 and 1835, he established free schools for free African American children. Inflamed by the propaganda of the American Anti-Slavery Society, a mob raided the Charleston post office in 1835 and the next day turned its attention to England's school. England led Charleston's "Irish Volunteers" to defend the school. Soon after this, however, all schools for "free blacks" were closed in Charleston, and England acquiesced.

Two pairs of Irish empresarios founded colonies in coastal Texas in 1828. John McMullen and James McGloin honored the Irish saint when they established the San Patricio Colony south of San Antonio; James Power and James Hewetson contracted to create the Refugio Colony on the Gulf Coast. The two colonies were settled mainly by Irish, but also by Mexicans and other nationalities. At least 87 Irish-surnamed individuals settled in the Peters Colony, which included much of present-day north-central Texas, in the 1840s. The Irish participated in all phases of Texas' war of independence against Mexico. Among those who died defending the Alamo in March 1836 were 12 who were Irish-born, while an additional 14 bore Irish surnames. About 100 Irish-born soldiers participated in the Battle of San Jacinto – about one-seventh of the total force of Texians in that conflict.

The Irish Catholics concentrated in a few medium-sized cities, where they were highly visible, especially in Charleston, Savannah and New Orleans. They often became precinct leaders in the Democratic Party Organizations, opposed abolition of slavery, and generally favored preserving the Union in 1860, when they voted for Stephen Douglas.

After secession in 1861, the Southern Irish Catholic community supported the Confederate States of America and 20,000 Irish Catholics served in the Confederate States Army. Gleason says:

Support for Irish Confederate soldiers from home was vital both for encouraging them to stay in the army and to highlight to native white southerners that the entire Irish community was behind the Confederacy. Civilian leaders of the Irish and the South did embrace the Confederate national project and most became advocates of a 'hard-war' policy.

Irish nationalist John Mitchel lived in Tennessee and Virginia during his exile from Ireland and was one of the Southern United States' most outspoken supporters during the American Civil War through his newspapers the Southern Citizen and the Richmond Enquirer.

Although most began as unskilled laborers, Irish Catholics in the South achieved average or above average economic status by 1900. David T. Gleeson emphasizes how well they were accepted by society:

Native tolerance, however, was also a very important factor in Irish integration [into Southern society].... Upper-class southerners, therefore, did not object to the Irish, because Irish immigration never threatened to overwhelm their cities or states.... The Irish were willing to take on potentially high-mortality occupations, thereby sparing valuable slave property. Some employers objected not only to the cost of Irish labor but also to the rowdiness of their foreign-born employees. Nevertheless, they recognized the importance of the Irish worker to the protection of slavery.... The Catholicism practiced by Irish immigrants was of little concern to Southern natives.

=== Mid-19th century and later ===
Irish immigration to the United States (1820–1975)
Period	Number of immigrants	Period	Number of immigrants
1820–1830	54,338	1911–1920	146,181
1831–1840	207,381	1921–1930	220,591
1841–1850	780,719	1931–1940	13,167
1851–1860	914,119	1941–1950	26,967
1861–1870	435,778	1951–1960	57,332
1871–1880	436,871	1961–1970	37,461
1881–1890	655,482	1971–1975	6,559
1891–1900	388,416		
1901–1910	399,065		
Total : 4,720,427

Before the 1800s, Irish immigrants to North America often moved to the countryside. Some worked in the fur trade, trapping and exploring, but most settled in rural farms and villages. They cleared the land of trees, built homes, and planted fields. Many others worked in coastal areas as fishers, on ships, and as dockworkers. In the 1800s, Irish immigrants in the United States tended to stay in the large cities where they landed.

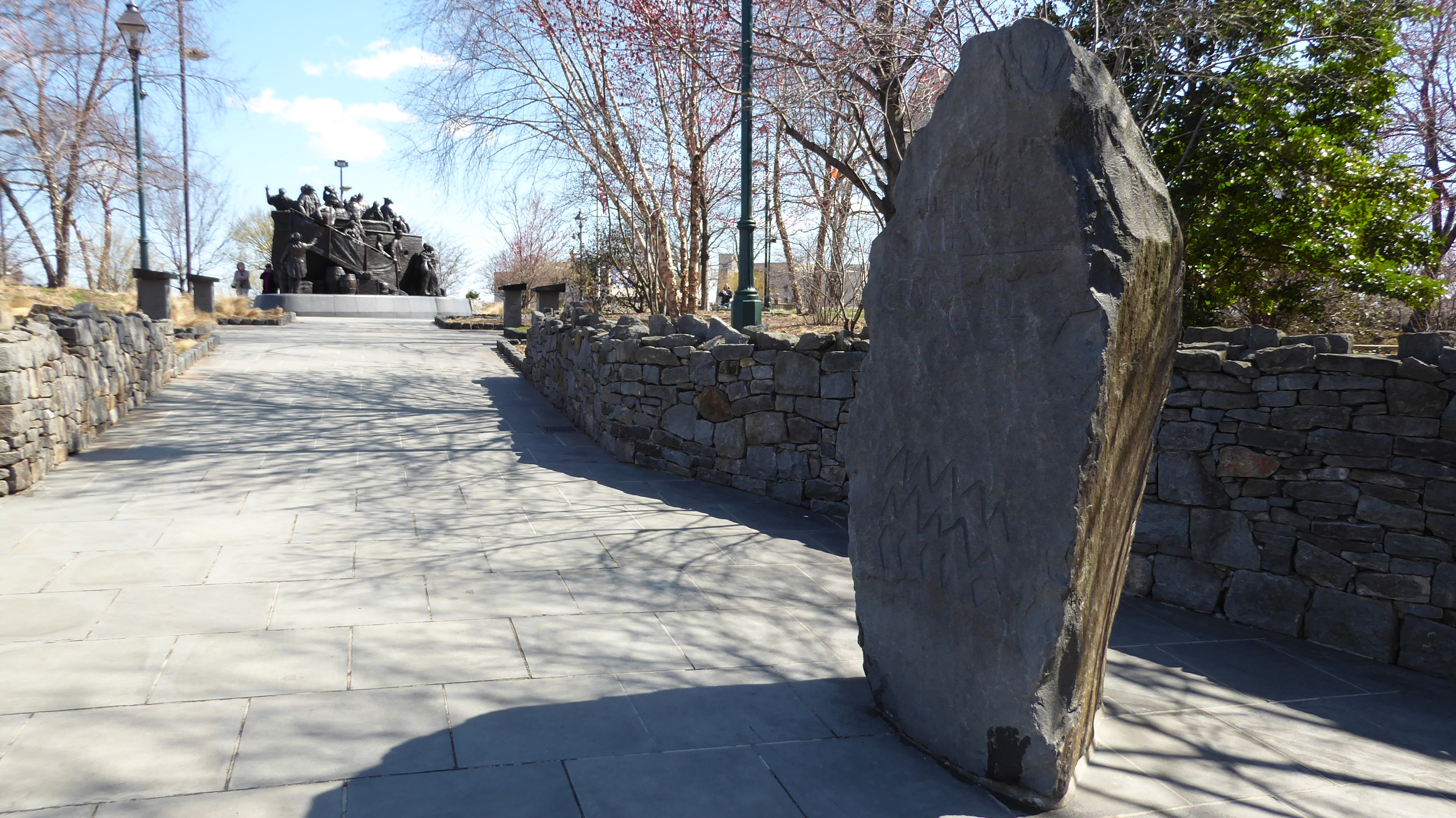
"Leacht Cuimhneacháin na nGael", Irish famine memorial located on Penn's Landing, Philadelphia

From 1820 to 1860, 1,956,557 Irish arrived, 75% of these after the Great Irish Famine (or The Great Hunger, Irish: An Gorta Mór) of 1845–1852, struck. According to a 2019 study, "the sons of farmers and illiterate men were more likely to emigrate than their literate and skilled counterparts. Emigration rates were highest in poorer farming communities with stronger migrant networks."

Of the total Irish immigrants to the U.S. from 1820 to 1860, many died crossing the ocean due to disease and dismal conditions of what became known as coffin ships. Irish immigration had greatly increased beginning in the 1830s due to the need for unskilled labor in canal building, lumbering, and construction works in the Northeast. The large Erie Canal project was one such example where Irishmen were many of the laborers. Small but tight communities developed in growing cities such as Philadelphia, Boston, and New York.

Most Irish immigrants to the United States during this period favored large cities because they could create their own communities for support and protection in a new environment. Cities with large numbers of Irish immigrants included Boston, Philadelphia, and New York, as well as Pittsburgh, Baltimore, Detroit, Chicago, Cleveland, St. Louis, St. Paul, San Francisco, and Los Angeles.

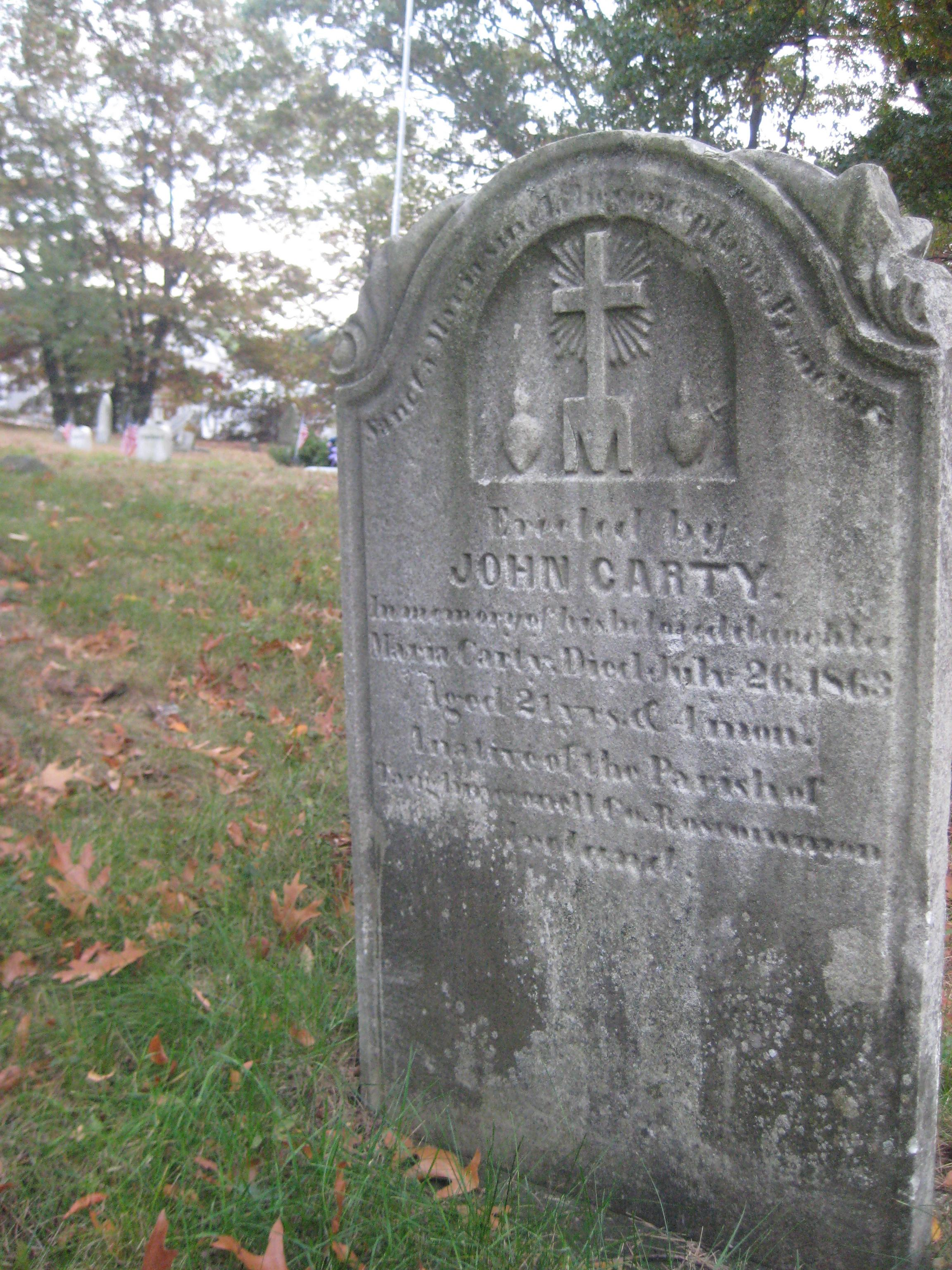
Gravestone in Boston Catholic cemetery erected in memory of County Roscommon native born shortly before the Great Famine

While many Irish did stay near large cities, countless others were part of westward expansion. They were enticed by tales of gold, and by the increasing opportunities for work and land. In 1854, the government opened Kansas Territory to settlers. While many people in general moved to take advantage of the unsettled land, Irish were an important part. Many Irish men were physical laborers. In order to colonize the west, many strong men were needed to build the towns and cities. Kansas City was one city that was built by Irish immigrants. Much of its population today is of Irish descent. Another reason for Irish migration west was the expansion of railroads. Railway work was a common occupation among immigrant men because workers were in such high demand. Many Irish men followed the expansion of railroads, and ended up settling in places that they built in. Since the Irish were a large part of those Americans moving west, much of their culture can still be found today.

Between 1851 and 1920, 3.3 to 3.7 million Irish immigrated to the United States, including more than 90 percent of the more than 1 million Ulster Protestant emigrants out of Ireland from 1851 to 1900. Following the Great Famine (1845–1852), emigration from Ireland came primarily from Munster and Connacht, while 28 percent of all immigrants from Ireland from 1851 to 1900 continued to come from Ulster. Ulster immigration continued to account for as much as 20 percent of all immigration from Ireland to the United States in the 1880s and 1890s, and still accounted for 19 percent of all immigration from Ireland to the United States from 1900 to 1909 and 25 percent from 1910 to 1914. The Catholic population in the United States grew to 3.1 million by 1860 (or approximately 10 percent of the total U.S. population of 31.4 million), to 6.3 million by 1880 (or approximately 13 percent of the total U.S. population of 50.2 million), and further to 19.8 million by 1920 (or approximately 19 percent of the total U.S. population of 106 million).

The 309 Connemara emigrants, selected by their local clergy as suitable for a new life in America, arrived at Boston June 14, 1880, 11 days after departure from Galway Bay on the SS Austrian, an Allen Line ship. The settling of 'The Connemaras', as they became known, was a new venture prompted by a Liverpool priest, Fr Patrick Nugent renowned for his 'philanthropic and truly patriotic exertions to alleviate the social conditions of his fellow countrymen in England'; and Archbishop John Ireland, of St Paul, Minnesota, who was already settling thousands of Irish Catholics who were trapped in the ghettoes of New York and elsewhere, on rich prairie lands.

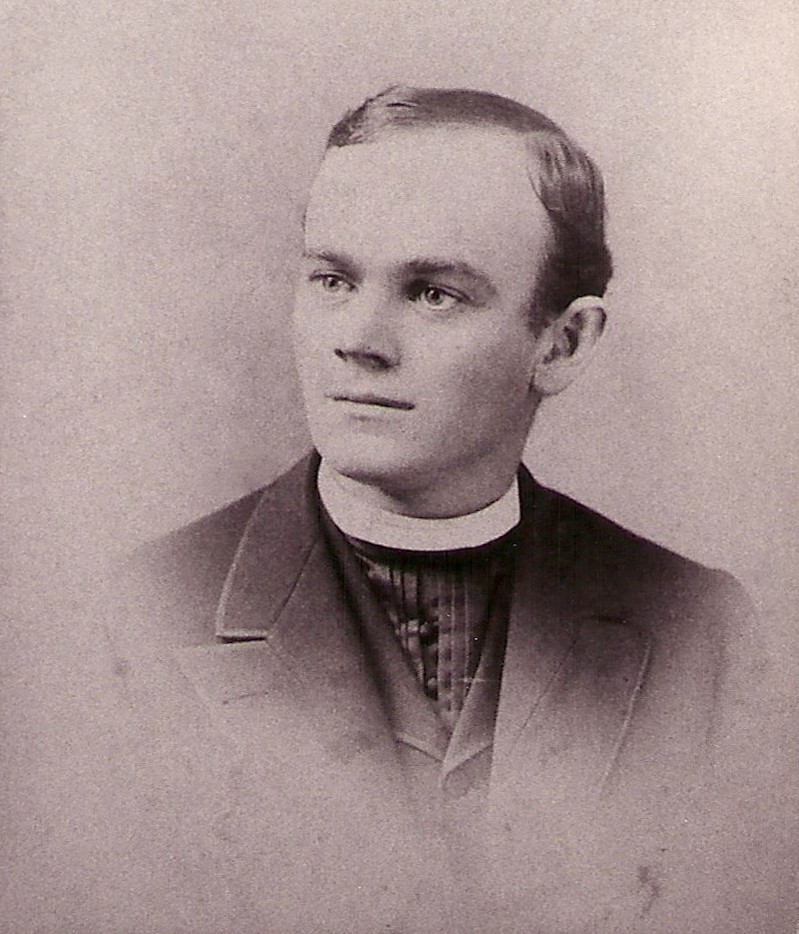
Thomas Ambrose Butler, an Irish Catholic priest, was a leading voice in urging Irish immigrants to colonize Kansas

However, due to continued immigration from Germany, and beginning in the 1880s, waves of immigration from Italy, Poland, and Canada (by French Canadians) as well as from Mexico from 1900 to 1920, Irish Catholics never accounted for a majority of the Catholic population in the United States through 1920. In the 1920s, an additional 220,000 immigrants from Ireland came to the United States, with emigration from Ulster falling off to 10,000 of 126,000 immigrants from Ireland (or less than 10 percent) between 1925 and 1930. Following the Immigration Act of 1924 and the Great Depression, from 1930 to 1975, only 141,000 more immigrants came from Ireland to the United States. Improving economic conditions during the Post–World War II economic expansion and the passage of the restrictive Immigration and Nationality Act of 1965 contributed to the decline in mass immigration from Ireland. Due to the early 1980s recession, 360,000 Irish emigrated out of the country, with the majority going to England and many to the United States (including approximately 40,000 to 150,000 on overstayed travel visas as undocumented aliens).

Beginning in the 1970s, surveys of self-identified Irish Americans found that consistent majorities of Irish Americans also self-identified as being Protestant. While there was a greater total number of immigrants after immigration from Ireland transitioned to being primarily Catholic in the mid-to-late 1830s, fertility rates in the United States were lower from 1840 to 1970 after immigration from Ireland became primarily Catholic than they were from 1700 to 1840 when immigration was primarily Protestant. Also, while Irish immigrants to the United States in the early 20th century had higher fertility rates than the U.S. population as a whole, they had lower fertility rates than German immigrants to the United States during the same time period and lower fertility rates than the contemporaneous population of Ireland, and subsequent generations had lower fertility rates than the emigrant generation. This is due to the fact that despite coming from the rural regions of an agrarian society, Irish immigrants in the post-Famine migration generally immigrated to the urban areas of the United States because by 1850 the costs of moving to a rural area and establishing a farm was beyond the financial means of most Irish immigrants. In the 1990s, the Irish economy began to boom again, and by the turn of the 21st century, immigration to Ireland from the United States began to consistently exceed immigration from Ireland to the United States.

==== Civil War through to the early 20th century ====
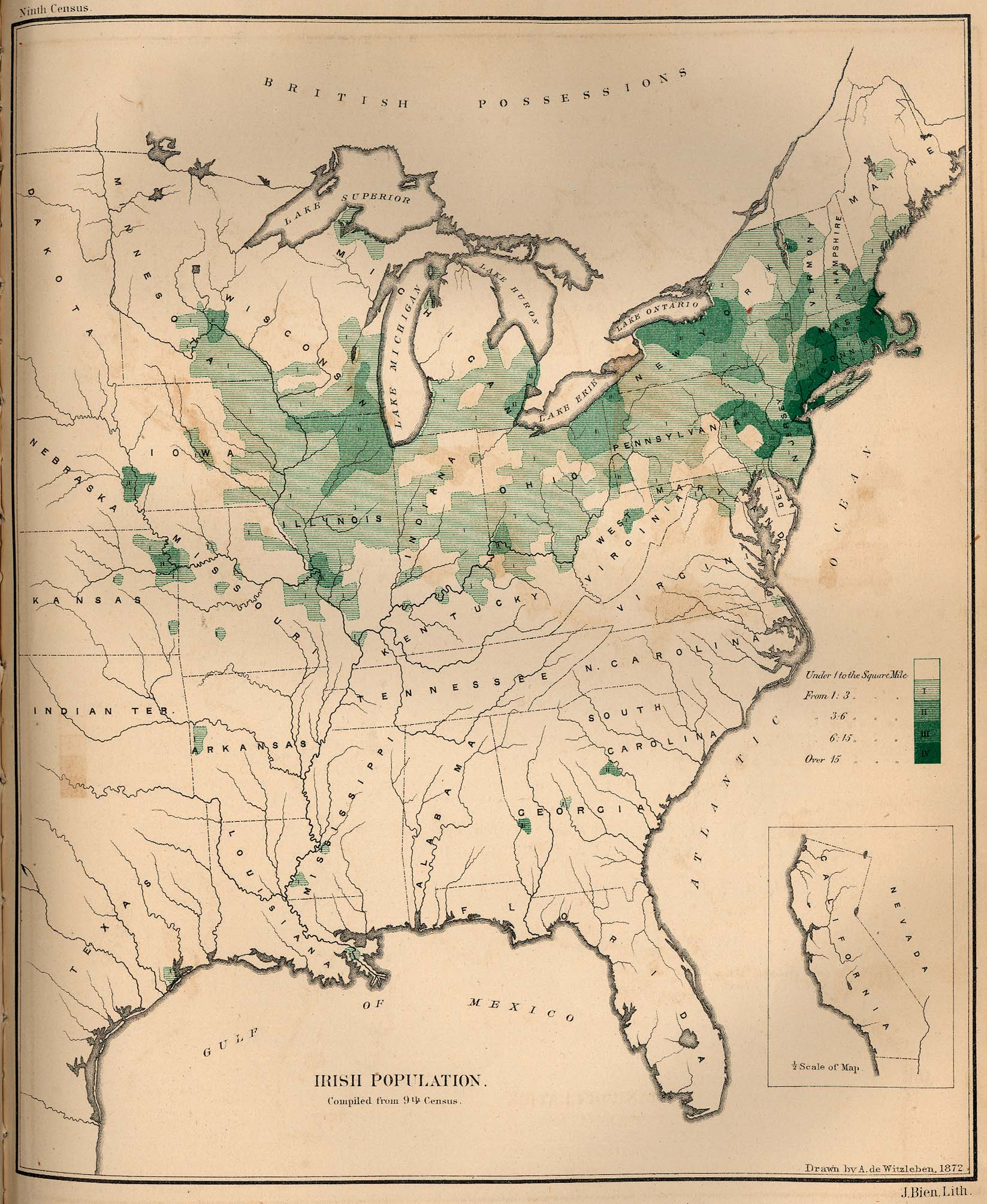
Concentration of people born in Ireland in 1870 Census

During the American Civil War, Irish Americans volunteered for the Union Army and at least 38 Union regiments had the word "Irish" in their titles. 144,221 Union soldiers were born in Ireland; additionally, perhaps an equal number of Union soldiers were of Irish descent. Many immigrant soldiers formed their own regiments, such as the Irish Brigade. However, in proportion to the general population, the Irish were the most underrepresented immigrant group fighting for the Union.

However, conscription was resisted by many Irish as an imposition. Two years into the war, the conscription law was passed in 1863, and major draft riots erupted in New York. It coincided with the efforts of the city's dominant political machine, Tammany Hall, to enroll Irish immigrants as citizens so they could vote in local elections. Many such immigrants suddenly discovered they were now expected to fight for their new country. The Irish, employed primarily as laborers, were usually unable to afford the $300 "commutation fee" to procure a replacement for service. Many of the Irish viewed blacks as competition for scarce jobs, and as the reason why the Civil War was being fought. African Americans who fell into the mob's hands were often beaten or killed. The Colored Orphan Asylum on Fifth Avenue, which provided shelter for hundreds of children, was attacked by a mob. It was seen as a "symbol of white charity to blacks and of black upward mobility," reasons enough for its destruction at the hands of a predominantly Irish mob which looked upon African Americans as direct social and economic competitors. Fortunately, the largely Irish-American police force was able to secure the orphanage for enough time to allow orphans to escape.

30,000 Irish or Irish-descended men joined the Confederate Army. Gleeson wrote that they had higher desertion rates than non-Irish, and sometimes switched sides, suggesting that their support for the Confederacy was tepid. During the Reconstruction era, however, some Irish took a strong position in favor of white supremacy, and some played major roles in attacking blacks in riots in Memphis.

In 1871, New York's Orange Riots broke out when Irish Protestants celebrated the Williamite victory at the Battle of the Boyne by parading through Irish Catholic neighborhoods, taunting the residents who then responded with violence. Police Superintendent James J. Kelso, a Protestant, ordered the parade cancelled as a threat to public safety. Kelso was overruled by the governor, who ordered 5000 militia to protect the marchers. The Catholics attacked but were stopped by the militia and police, who opened fire killing about 63 Catholics.

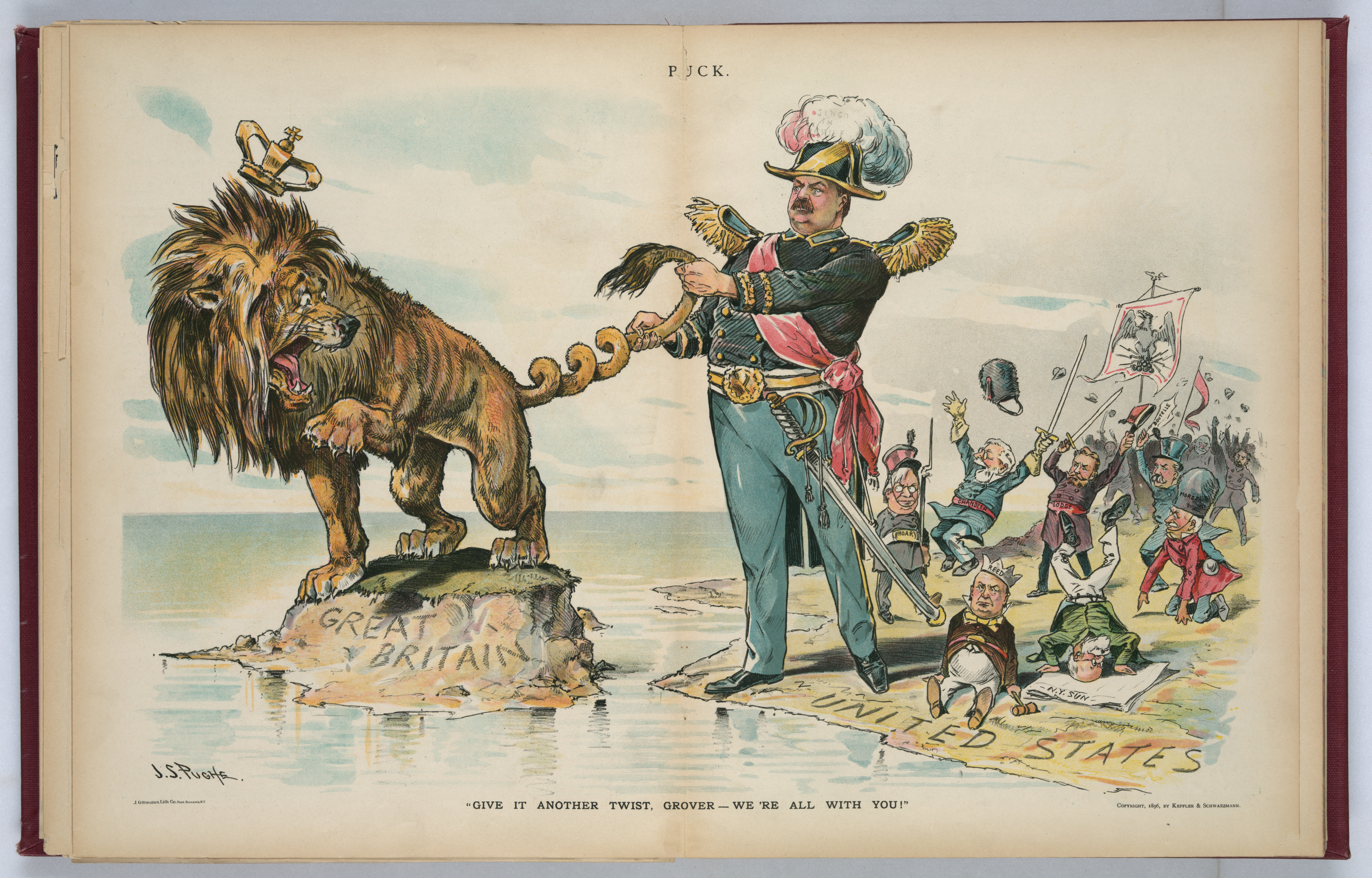
U.S. President Grover Cleveland twisting the tail of the British Lion as Americans cheer in the Venezuelan crisis of 1895; cartoon in Puck by J.S. Pughe

Relations between the U.S. and Britain were chilly during the 1860s as Americans resented instances of British and Canadian support for the Confederacy during the Civil War. After the war American authorities looked the other way as Irish Catholic "Fenians" plotted and even attempted an invasion of Canada. The Fenians proved a failure, but Irish Catholic politicians (Who were a growing power in the Democratic Party) demanded more independence for Ireland and made anti-British rhetoric—called "twisting the lion's tail"—a staple of election campaign appeals to the Irish Catholic vote.

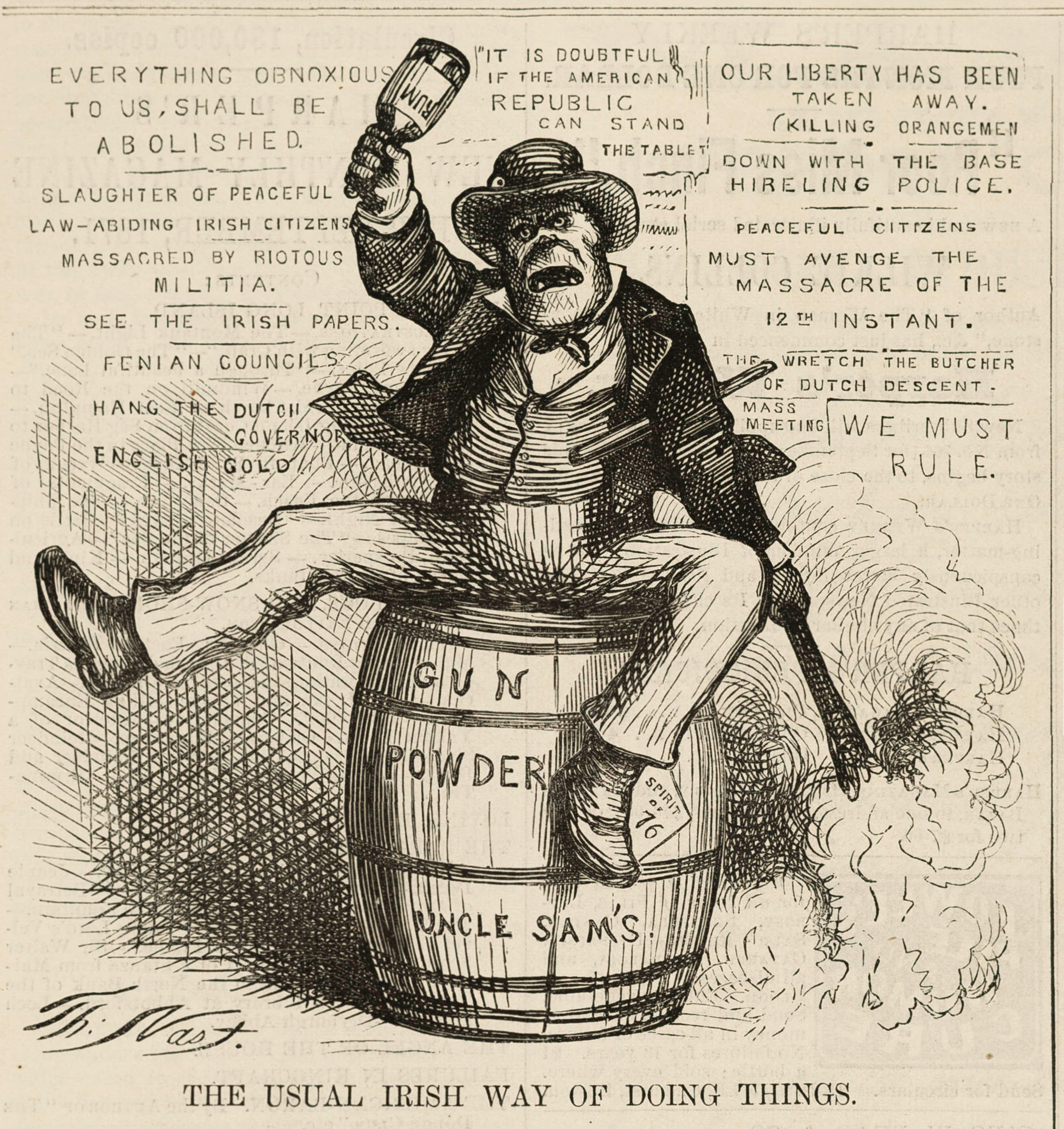
American political cartoon by Thomas Nast titled "The Usual Irish Way of Doing Things", depicting a drunken Irishman lighting a powder keg and swinging a bottle. Published 2 September 1871 in Harper's Weekly

Later immigrants mostly settled in industrial towns and cities of the Northeast and Midwest where Irish American neighborhoods had previously been established.

The Irish were having a huge impact on America as a whole. In 1910, there were more people in New York City of Irish ancestry than Dublin's whole population, and even today, many of these cities still retain a substantial Irish-American community. The best urban economic opportunities for unskilled Irish women and men included "factory and millwork, domestic service, and the physical labor of public work projects."

During the mid-1900s, immigrants from Ireland were coming to the U.S. for the same reasons as those before them; they came looking for jobs.

== Social history in the United States ==
=== Religion and society ===
Religion has been important to the Irish American identity in America, and continues to play a major role in their communities. Surveys conducted since the 1970s have shown consistent majorities or pluralities of those who self-identify as being of Irish ancestry in the United States as also self-identifying as Protestants. The Protestants' ancestors arrived primarily in the colonial era, while Catholics are primarily descended from immigrants of the 19th century. Irish leaders have been prominent in the Catholic Church in the United States for over 150 years. The Irish have been leaders in the Presbyterian and Methodist traditions, as well.

Surveys in the 1990s show that of Americans who identify themselves as "Irish", 51% said they were Protestant and 36% identified as Catholic. In the Southern United States, Protestants account for 73% of those claiming Irish origins, while Catholics account for 19%. In the Northern United States, 45% of those claiming Irish origin are Catholic, while 39% are Protestant.

==== Irish Roman Catholic and Ulster Protestant relations ====
Between 1607 and the 1830s, the majority of immigrants from Ireland to America were Protestants who were described simply as "Irish". The religious distinction became important after 1820, when large numbers of Irish Roman Catholics began to emigrate to the United States. Some of the descendants of the colonial Irish Protestant settlers from Ulster began thereafter to redefine themselves as "Scotch Irish", to stress their historic origins, and distanced themselves from Irish Roman Catholics; others continued to call themselves Irish, especially in areas of the South which saw little Irish Roman Catholic immigration. By the 1830s, Irish diaspora demographics had changed rapidly, with over 60% of all Irish immigrant settlers in the U.S. being Roman Catholics from rural areas of Ireland.

Some Protestant Irish immigrants became active in explicitly anti-Catholic organizations such as the Orange Institution and the American Protective Association. However, participation in the Orange Institution was never as large in the United States as it was in Canada. In the early nineteenth century, the post-Revolutionary republican spirit of the new United States attracted exiled United Irishmen such as Theobald Wolf Tone and others, with the presidency of Andrew Jackson exemplifying this attitude. Most Protestant Irish immigrants in the first several decades of the nineteenth century were those who held to the republicanism of the 1790s, and who were unable to accept Orangeism. Loyalists and Orangemen made up a minority of Irish Protestant immigrants to the United States during this period. Most of the Irish loyalist emigration was bound for Upper Canada and the Canadian Maritime provinces, where Orange lodges were able to flourish under the British flag.

By 1870, when there were about 930 Orange lodges in the Canadian province of Ontario, there were only 43 in the entire eastern United States. These few American lodges were founded by newly arriving Protestant Irish immigrants in coastal cities such as Philadelphia and New York. These ventures were short-lived and of limited political and social impact, although there were specific instances of violence involving Orangemen between Catholic and Protestant Irish immigrants, such as the Orange Riots in New York City in 1824, 1870, and 1871.

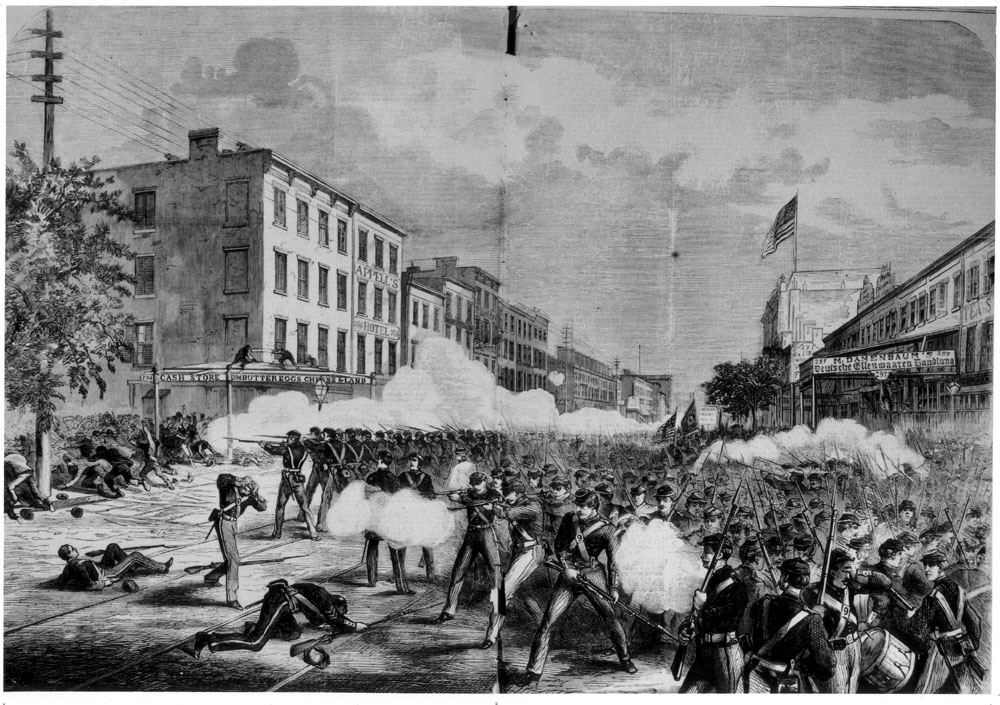
The Orange riot of 1871 as depicted in Frank Leslie's Illustrated Newspaper. The view is at 25th Street in Manhattan looking south down Eighth Avenue.

The first "Orange riot" on record was in 1824, in Abingdon Square, New York, resulting from a 12 July march. Several Orangemen were arrested and found guilty of inciting the riot. According to the State prosecutor in the court record, "the Orange celebration was until then unknown in the country." The immigrants involved were admonished: "In the United States the oppressed of all nations find an asylum, and all that is asked in return is that they become law-abiding citizens. Orangemen, Ribbonmen, and United Irishmen are alike unknown. They are all entitled to protection by the laws of the country." The later Orange Riots of 1870 and 1871 killed nearly 70 people, and were fought out between Irish Protestant and Catholic immigrants. After this the activities of the Orange Order were banned for a time, the Order dissolved, and most members joined Masonic orders. After 1871, there were no more riots between Irish Roman Catholics and Protestants.

America offered a new beginning, and "...most descendents of the Ulster Presbyterians of the eighteenth century and even many new Protestant Irish immigrants turned their backs on all associations with Ireland and melted into the American Protestant mainstream."

==== Catholics ====
Irish priests (especially Dominicans, Franciscans, Augustinians and Capuchins) came to the large cities of the East in the 1790s, and when new dioceses were erected in 1808 the first bishop of New York was an Irishman in recognition of the contribution of the early Irish clergy.

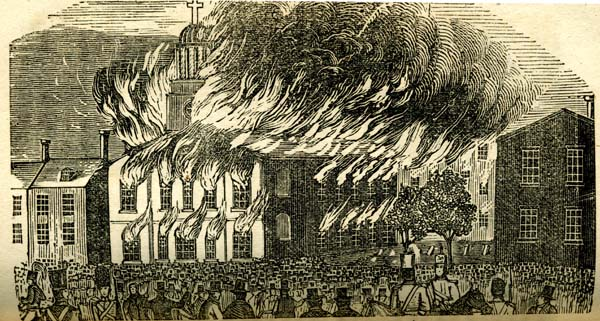
St. Augustine's Church on fire. Anti-Irish, anti-Catholic Nativist riots in Philadelphia in 1844.

Saint Patrick's Battalion (San Patricios) was a group of several hundred immigrant soldiers, the majority Irish, who deserted the U.S. Army during the Mexican–American War because of ill treatment or sympathetic leanings to fellow Mexican Catholics. They joined the Mexican army.

In Boston between 1810 and 1840 there had been serious tensions between the bishop and the laity who wanted to control the local parishes. By 1845, the Catholic population in Boston had increased to 30,000 from around 5,000 in 1825, due to the influx of Irish immigrants. With the appointment of John B. Fitzpatrick as bishop in 1845, tensions subsided as the increasingly Irish Catholic community grew to support Fitzpatrick's assertion of the bishop's control of parish government.

In New York, Archbishop John Hughes (1797–1864), an Irish immigrant himself, was deeply involved in "the Irish question"—Irish independence from British rule. Hughes supported Daniel O'Connell's Catholic emancipation movement in Ireland, but rejected such radical and violent societies as the Young Irelanders and the National Brotherhood. Hughes also disapproved of American Irish radical fringe groups, urging immigrants to assimilate themselves into American life while remaining patriotic to Ireland "only individually". In Hughes's view, a large-scale movement to form Irish settlements in the western United States was too isolationist and ultimately detrimental to immigrants' success in the New World.

In the 1840s, Hughes campaigned for publicly funded schools for Catholic immigrants from Ireland modelled after the successful Irish public school system in Lowell, Massachusetts. Hughes made speeches denouncing the Public School Society of New York, which mandated that all educational institutions use the King James Bible, an unacceptable proposition to Catholics. The dispute between Catholics and Protestants over the funding of schools led the New York Legislature to pass the Maclay Act in 1842, giving New York City an elective Board of Education empowered to build and supervise schools and distribute the education fund—but with the proviso that none of the money should go to schools which taught religion. Hughes responded by building an elaborate parochial school system that stretched to the college level, setting a policy followed in other large cities. Efforts to get city or state funding failed because of vehement Protestant opposition to a system that rivaled the public schools.

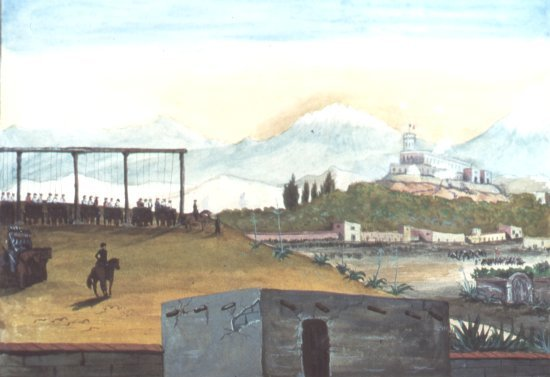
The mass hanging of Irish Catholic soldiers who joined the Mexican army

Many Irish Catholics that had made the passage across the Atlantic, especially after the rapid increase in Irish Catholic emigration after the Great Famine in 1845, had formed their own communities inside urban cities. The Irish Roman Catholic community did not share the same patterns of life, coming from a peasant society, as Protestant Americans the same way that the Ulster Protestants did before them and therefore couldn't integrate as easily into American society. They quickly found themselves on the bottom of the socioeconomic ladder due to their lack of skills from agricultural serfdom and lack of funds which resulted in many Catholics moving into Irish ghettos. In 1870, 72% of Irish Americans were concentrated in the urban industrial estates of Massachusetts, Connecticut, New York, New Jersey, Pennsylvania, Ohio, and Illinois. Catholics found that urban living suited their lifestyle as a gregarious, community-minded population. Urban areas offered close proximity to other ethnic Irish peoples in their community that rural America was unable to offer.

In the west, Catholic Irish were having a large effect as well. The open west attracted many Irish immigrants. Many of these immigrants were Catholic. When they migrated west, they would form "little pockets" with other Irish immigrants. Irish Roman Catholic communities were made in "supportive, village style neighborhoods centered around a Catholic church and called 'parishes'". These neighborhoods affected the overall lifestyle and atmosphere of the communities. Other ways religion played a part in these towns was the fact that many were started by Irish Catholic priests. Father Bernard Donnelly started "Town of Kansas" which would later become Kansas City. His influence over early stages Kansas City was great, and so the Catholic religion was spread to other settlers who arrived. While not all settlers became Catholics, a great number of the early settlers were Catholic. In other western communities, Irish priests wanted to convert the Native Americans to Catholicism. These Catholic Irish would contribute not only to the growth of Catholic population in America, but to the values and traditions in America.

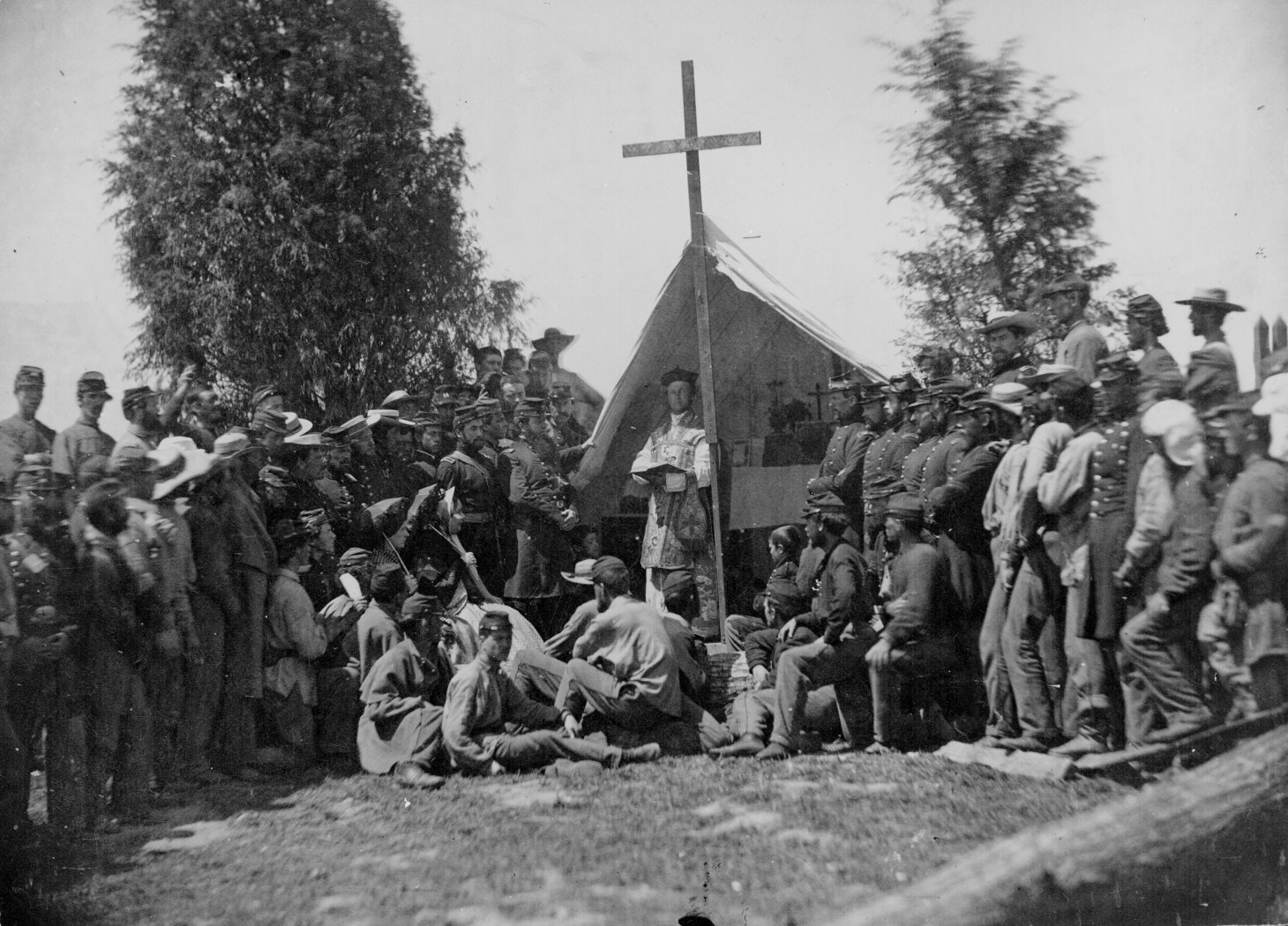
Officers and men of the Irish-Catholic 69th New York Volunteer Regiment attend church services at Fort Corcoran in 1861.

Jesuits established a network of colleges in major cities, including Boston College, Fordham University in New York, and Georgetown University in Washington, D.C. Fordham was founded in 1841 and attracted students from other regions of the United States, and even South America and the Caribbean. At first exclusively a liberal arts institution, it built a science building in 1886, lending more legitimacy to science in the curriculum there. In addition, a three-year Bachelor of Science degree was created. Boston College, by contrast, was established over twenty years later in 1863 to appeal to urban Irish Roman Catholics. It offered a rather limited intellectual curriculum, however, with the priests at Boston College prioritizing spiritual and sacramental activities over intellectual pursuits. One consequence was that Harvard Law School would not admit Boston College graduates to its law school. Modern Jesuit leadership in American academia was not to become their hallmark across all institutions until the 20th century.

The Irish became prominent in the leadership of the Catholic Church in the U.S. by the 1850s—by 1890 there were 7.3 million Catholics in the U.S. and growing, and most bishops were Irish. As late as the 1970s, when Irish were 17% of American Roman Catholics, they were 35% of the priests and 50% of the bishops, together with a similar proportion of presidents of Catholic colleges and hospitals.

==== Protestants ====
The Scots-Irish who settled in the back country of colonial America were largely Presbyterians. The establishment of many settlements in the remote back-country put a strain on the ability of the Presbyterian Church to meet the new demand for qualified, college-educated clergy. Religious groups such as the Baptists and Methodists did not require higher education of their ministers, so they could more readily supply ministers to meet the demand of the growing Scots-Irish settlements. By about 1810, Baptist and Methodist churches were in the majority, and the descendants of the Scotch-Irish today remain predominantly Baptist or Methodist. They were avid participants in the revivals taking place during the Great Awakening from the 1740s to the 1840s. They take pride in their Irish heritage because they identify with the values ascribed to the Scotch-Irish who played a major role in the American Revolution and in the development of American culture.

===== Presbyterians =====
The first Presbyterian community in America was established in 1640 in Southampton, Long Island New York. Francis Makemie, an Irish Presbyterian immigrant later established churches in Maryland and Virginia. Makemie was born and raised near Ramelton, County Donegal, to Ulster Scots parents. He was educated in the University of Glasgow and set out to organize and initiate the construction of several Presbyterian Churches throughout Maryland and Virginia. He founded the first Presbyterian congregation in Snow Hill, Maryland in 1683. By 1706, Makemie and his followers constructed a Presbyterian Church in Rehobeth, Maryland. In 1707, after traveling to New York to establish a presbytery, Francis Makemie was charged with preaching without a license by the English immigrant and Governor of New York, Edward Hyde. Makemie won a vital victory for the fight of religious freedom for Scots-Irish immigrants when he was acquitted and gained recognition for having "stood up to Anglican authorities". Makemie became one of the wealthiest immigrants to colonial America, owning more than 5,000 acres and 33 slaves.

New Light Presbyterians founded the College of New Jersey, later renamed Princeton University, in 1746 in order to train ministers dedicated to their views. The college was the educational and religious capital of Scots-Irish America. By 1808, loss of confidence in the college within the Presbyterian Church led to the establishment of the separate Princeton Theological Seminary, but deep Presbyterian influence at the college continued through the 1910s, as typified by university president Woodrow Wilson.

Out on the frontier, the Scots-Irish Presbyterians of the Muskingum Valley in Ohio established Muskingum College at New Concord in 1837. It was led by two clergymen, Samuel Wilson and Benjamin Waddle, who served as trustees, president, and professors during the first few years. During the 1840s and 1850s the college survived the rapid turnover of very young presidents who used the post as a stepping stone in their clerical careers, and in the late 1850s it weathered a storm of student protest. Under the leadership of L. B. W. Shryock during the Civil War, Muskingum gradually evolved from a local and locally controlled institution to one serving the entire Muskingum Valley. It is still affiliated with the Presbyterian church.

Brought up in a Scots-Irish Presbyterian home, Cyrus McCormick of Chicago developed a strong sense of devotion to the Presbyterian Church. Throughout his later life, he used the wealth gained through invention of the mechanical reaper to further the work of the church. His benefactions were responsible for the establishment in Chicago of the Presbyterian Theological Seminary of the Northwest (after his death renamed the McCormick Theological Seminary of the Presbyterian Church). He assisted the Union Presbyterian Seminary in Richmond, Virginia. He also supported a series of religious publications, beginning with the Presbyterian Expositor in 1857 and ending with the Interior (later called The Continent), which his widow continued until her death.

===== Methodists =====
Irish immigrants were the first immigrant group to America to build and organize Methodist churches. Many of the early Irish immigrants who did so came from a German-Irish background. Barbara Heck, an Irish woman of German descent from County Limerick, Ireland, immigrated to America in 1760, with her husband, Paul. She is often considered to be the "Mother of American Methodism." Heck guided and mentored her cousin, Philip Embury, who was also an "Irish Palatine" immigrant. Heck and Embury constructed the John Street Methodist Church, which today is usually recognized as the oldest Methodist Church in the United States. However, another church constructed by prominent Irish Methodist immigrant, Robert Strawbridge, may have preceded the John Street Methodist Church.

==== Irish Jews ====
While most Irish Americans are from Christian religious backgrounds, some are Irish Jews. A 1927 news article published by The American Hebrew reported that New York City was home to 1,000 Irish American Jews and that several thousand more lived elsewhere in the United States. In the same year, an organization formed in Brooklyn called "The Irish Jews of America" and planned to establish an Irish-American synagogue.

In 1969, an organization of Irish American Jews in New York City called the "Loyal Yiddish Sons of Erin" celebrated when Purim and St. Patrick's Day fell on the same date. Members of the group also celebrated Erev St. Patrick's Day Banquet each year, serving corned beef, green bagels, and green matzo balls.

==== Women ====
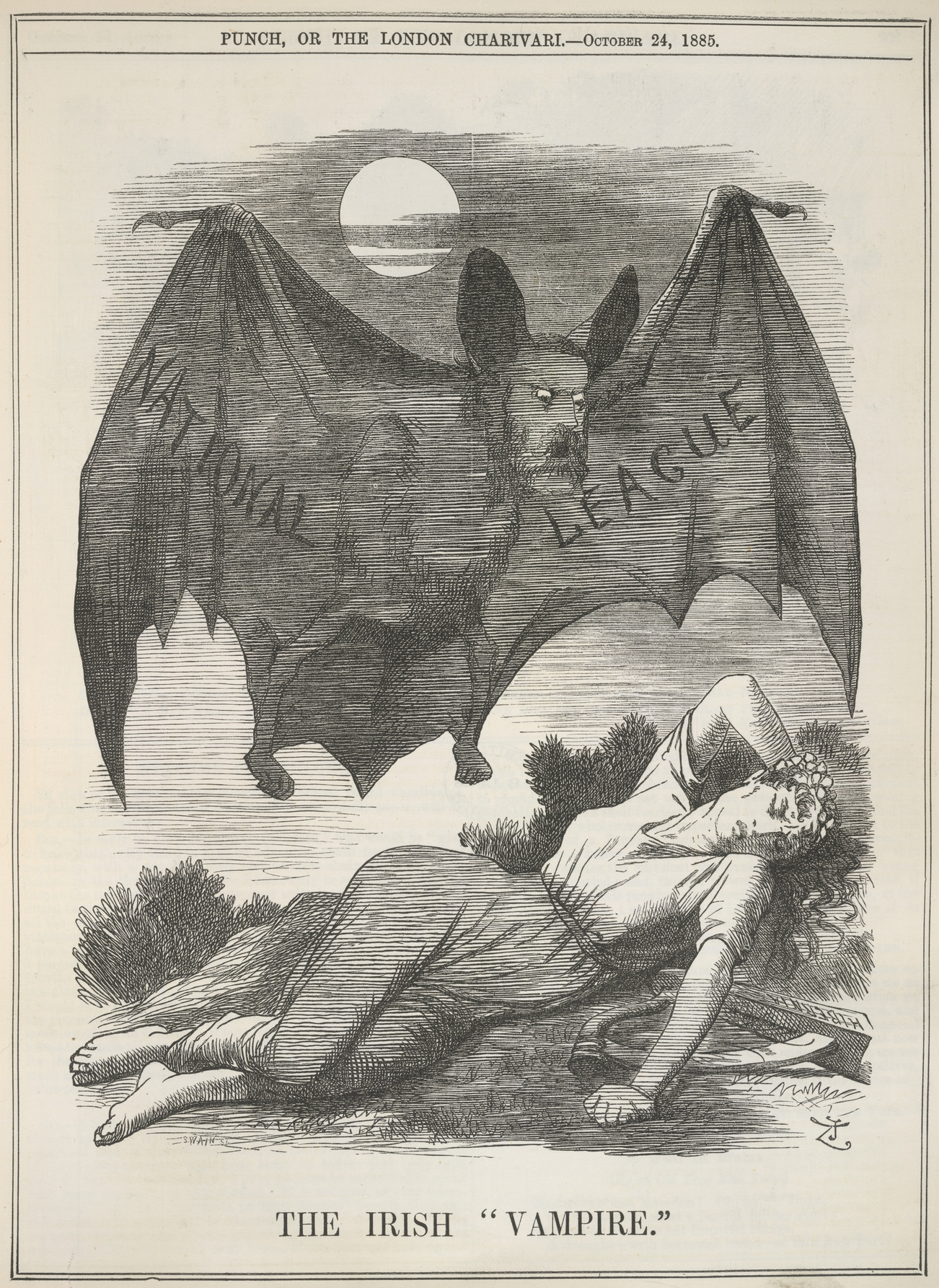
Irish Lass depiction in 1885.

The Irish people were the first of many to immigrate to the U.S. in mass waves, including large groups of single young women between the ages of 16 and 24. Up until this point, free women who settled in the colonies mostly came after their husbands had already made the journey and could afford their trip, or were brought over to be married to an eligible colonist who paid for their journey. Many Irish fled their home country to escape unemployment and starvation during the Great Irish Famine. The richest of the Irish resettled in England, where their skilled work was greatly accepted, but lower class Irish and women could find little work in Western Europe, leading them to cross the Atlantic in search of greater financial opportunities.

Some Irish women resorted to prostitution in large cities such as Boston and New York City. They were often arrested for intoxication, public lewdness, and petty larceny. Most of the single Irish women preferred service labor as a form of income. These women made a higher wage than most by serving the middle and high-class in their own homes as nannies, cooks and cleaners. The wages for domestic service were higher than that of factory workers and they lived in the attics of upscale mansions. By 1870, forty percent of Irish women worked as domestic servants in New York City, making them over fifty percent of the service industry at the time.

Prejudices ran deep in the north and could be seen in newspaper cartoons depicting Irish men as hot-headed, violent drunkards. The initial backlash the Irish received in America lead to their self-imposed seclusion, making assimilation into society a long and painful process.

==== Irish Americans of African American descent ====
Historians of the Irish diaspora have tended to overlook the history of Black Irish Americans. The New Deal's Federal Writers' Project includes many narratives of Irish American slave owners and poor Irish American workers engaging in sexual relations with both enslaved and free Black people, and numerous children were born of mixed Irish and Black heritage.

The African American Irish Diaspora Network is an organization founded in 2020 that is dedicated to Black Irish Americans and their history and culture. Black Irish American activists and scholars have pushed to increase awareness of Black Irish history and advocate for greater inclusion of Black people within the Irish-American community.

In 2021, New York University marked the beginning of Black History Month Ireland by publishing a report on Black and Brown Irish Americans. The report was created to bring visibility to Irish Americans of color and increase awareness of the racial diversity within the Irish-American community.

==== Language ====
Down to the end of the 19th century a large number of Irish immigrants arrived speaking Irish as their first language. This continued to be the case with immigrants from certain counties even in the 20th century. The Irish language was first mentioned as being spoken in North America in the 17th century. Large numbers of Irish emigrated to America throughout the 18th century, bringing the language with them, and it was particularly strong in Pennsylvania. It was also widely spoken in such places as New York City, where it proved a useful recruiting tool for Loyalists during the American Revolution.

Irish speakers continued to arrive in large numbers throughout the 19th century, particularly after the Famine. There was a certain amount of literacy in Irish, as shown by the many Irish-language manuscripts which immigrants brought with them. In 1881 An Gaodhal was founded, being the first newspaper in the world to be largely in Irish. It continued to be published into the 20th century, and now has an online successor in An Gael, an international literary magazine. A number of Irish immigrant newspapers in the 19th and 20th centuries had Irish language columns.

Irish immigrants fell into three linguistic categories: monolingual Irish speakers, bilingual speakers of both Irish and English, and monolingual English speakers. Estimates indicate that there were around 400,000 Irish speakers in the United States in the 1890s, located primarily in New York City, Philadelphia, Boston, Chicago and Yonkers. The Irish-speaking population of New York reached its height in this period, when speakers of Irish numbered between 70,000 and 80,000. This number declined during the early 20th century, dropping to 40,000 in 1939, 10,000 in 1979, and 5,000 in 1995.

According to the 2000 census, the Irish language ranks 66th out of the 322 languages spoken today in the U.S., with over 25,000 speakers. New York state has the most Irish speakers of the 50 states, and Massachusetts the highest percentage.

Daltaí na Gaeilge, a nonprofit Irish language advocacy group based in Elberon, New Jersey, estimated that about 30,000 people spoke the language in America as of 2006. This, the organization claimed, was a remarkable increase from only a few thousand at the time of the group's founding in 1981.

=== Occupations ===
Before 1800, significant numbers of Irish Protestant immigrants became farmers; many headed to the frontier where land was cheap or free and it was easier to start a farm or herding operation. Many Irish Protestants and Catholics alike were indentured servants, unable to pay their own passage or sentenced to servitude.

After 1840, most Irish Catholic immigrants went directly to the cities, mill towns, and railroad or canal construction sites on the East Coast. In Upstate New York, the Great Lakes area, the Midwest and the Far West, many became farmers or ranchers. In the East, male Irish laborers were hired by Irish contractors to work on canals, railroads, streets, sewers and other construction projects, particularly in New York state and New England. The Irish men also worked in these labor positions in the mid-west. They worked to construct towns where there had been none previously. Kansas City was one such town, and eventually became an important cattle town and railroad center. William Scully (1821–1906), from a wealthy landowning Catholic family in West Tipperary, Ireland, immigrated to Chicago in 1851. He bought up hundreds of thousands of acres of prime Corn Belt farmland in the Midwest, and rented it to tenants. By 1906 he owned and 225,000 acres in Illinois, Kansas, Nebraska, and Missouri, renting it out to 1200 tenants.

Labor positions were not the only occupations for Irish, though. Some moved to New England mill towns, such as Holyoke, Lowell, Taunton, Brockton, Fall River, and Milford, Massachusetts, where owners of textile mills welcomed the new, low-wage workers. They took the jobs previously held by Yankee women known as Lowell girls. A large percentage of Irish Catholic women took jobs as maids in hotels and private households.

Large numbers of unemployed or very poor Irish Catholics lived in squalid conditions in the new city slums and tenements.

Single, Irish immigrant women quickly assumed jobs in high demand but for very low pay. The majority of them worked in mills, factories, and private households and were considered the bottommost group in the female job hierarchy, alongside African American women. Workers considered mill work in cotton textiles and needle trades the least desirable because of the dangerous and unpleasant conditions. Factory work was primarily a worst-case scenario for widows or daughters of families already involved in the industry.

Unlike many other immigrants, Irish women preferred domestic work because it was constantly in great demand among middle- and upper-class American households. Although wages differed across the country, they were consistently higher than those of the other occupations available to Irish women and could often be negotiated because of the lack of competition. Also, the working conditions in well-off households were significantly better than those of factories or mills, and free room and board allowed domestic servants to save money or send it back to their families in Ireland.

Despite some of the benefits of domestic work, Irish women's job requirements were difficult and demeaning. Subject to their employers around the clock, Irish women cooked, cleaned, babysat and more. Because most servants lived in the home where they worked, they were separated from their communities. Most of all, the American stigma on domestic work suggested that Irish women were failures who had "about the same intelligence as that of an old grey-headed negro." This quote illustrates how, in a period of extreme racism towards African Americans, society similarly viewed Irish immigrants as inferior beings.

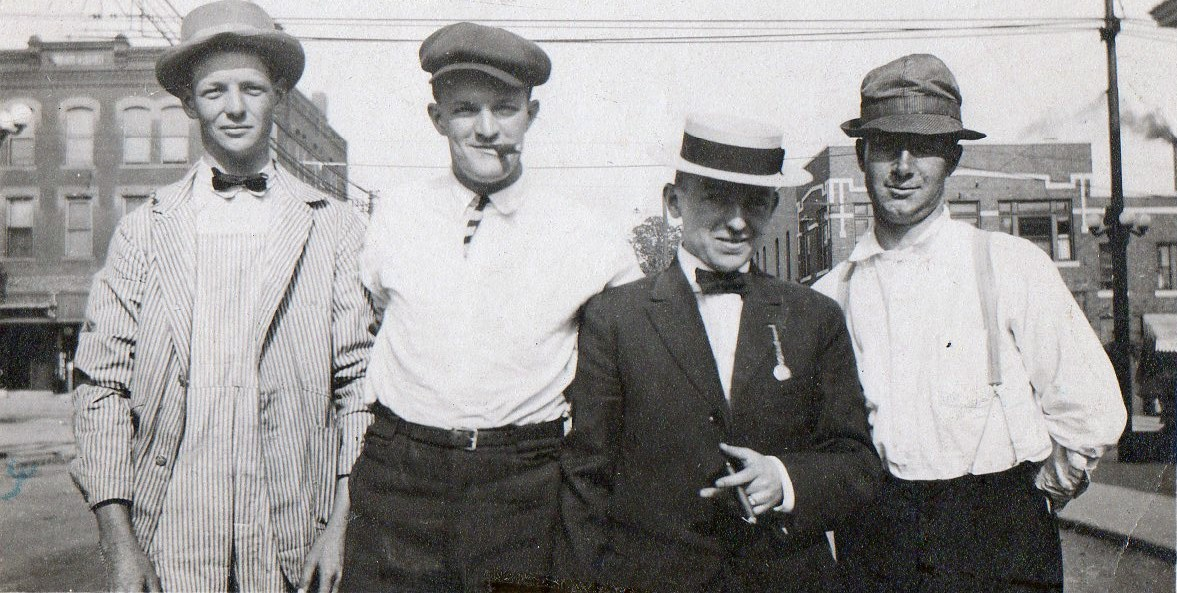
Irish immigrants in Kansas City, Missouri, c. 1909

Although the Irish Catholics started very low on the social status scale, by 1900 they had jobs and earnings about equal on average to their neighbors. This was largely due to their ability to speak English when they arrived. The Irish were able to rise quickly within the working world, unlike non-English speaking immigrants. Yet there were still many shanty and lower working class communities in Chicago, Philadelphia, Boston, New York, and other parts of the country.

After 1945, the Catholic Irish consistently ranked at the top of the social hierarchy, thanks especially to their high rate of college attendance, and due to that many Irish American men have risen to higher socio-economic table.

==== Local government ====
In the 19th century, jobs in local government were distributed by politicians to their supporters, and with significant strength in city hall the Irish became candidates for positions in all departments, such as police departments, fire departments, public schools and other public services of major cities. In 1897 New York City was formed by consolidating its five boroughs. That created 20,000 new patronage jobs. New York invested heavily in large-scale public works. This produced thousands of unskilled and semi-skilled jobs in subways, street railroads, waterworks, and port facilities. Over half the Irish men employed by the city worked in utilities. Across all ethnic groups In New York City, municipal employment grew from 54,000 workers in 1900 to 148,000 in 1930. In New York City, Albany, and Jersey City, about one third of the Irish of the first and second generation had municipal jobs in 1900.

==== Police ====
By 1855, according to New York Police Commissioner George W. Matsell (1811–1877), almost 17 percent of the police department's officers were Irish-born (compared to 28.2 percent of the city) in a report to the Board of Aldermen; of the NYPD's 1,149 men, Irish-born officers made up 304 of 431 foreign-born policemen. In the 1860s more than half of those arrested in New York City were Irish born or of Irish descent but nearly half of the city's law enforcement officers were also Irish. By the turn of the 20th century, five out of six NYPD officers were Irish born or of Irish descent. As late as the 1960s, 42% of the NYPD were Irish Americans.

Up to the 20th and early 21st century, Irish Catholics continue to be prominent in the law enforcement community, especially in the Northeastern United States. The Emerald Society, an Irish American fraternal organization, was founded in 1953 by the NYPD. When the Boston chapter of the Emerald Society formed in 1973, half of the city's police officers became members.

==== Teachers ====
Towards the end of the 19th century, schoolteaching became the most desirable occupation for the second generation of female Irish immigrants. Teaching was similar to domestic work for the first generation of Irish immigrants in that it was a popular job and one that relied on a woman's decision to remain unmarried. The disproportionate number of Irish-American Catholic women who entered the job market as teachers in the late 19th century and early 20th century from Boston to San Francisco was a beneficial result of the Irish National school system. Irish schools prepared young single women to support themselves in a new country, which inspired them to instill the importance of education, college training, and a profession in their American-born daughters even more than in their sons.

Evidence from schools in New York City illustrate the upward trend of Irish women as teachers: "as early as 1870, twenty percent of all schoolteachers were Irish women, and...by 1890 Irish females comprised two-thirds of those in the Sixth Ward schools." Irish women attained admirable reputations as schoolteachers, which enabled some to pursue professions of even higher stature.

==== Nuns ====
Upon arrival in the United States, many Irish women became Catholic nuns and participated in the many American sisterhoods, especially those in St. Louis in Missouri, St. Paul in Minnesota, and Troy in New York. Additionally, the women who settled in these communities were often sent back to Ireland to recruit. This kind of religious lifestyle appealed to Irish female immigrants because they outnumbered their male counterparts and the Irish cultural tendency to postpone marriage often promoted gender separation and celibacy. Furthermore, "the Catholic church, clergy, and women religious were highly respected in Ireland," making the sisterhoods particularly attractive to Irish immigrants.

Nuns provided extensive support for Irish immigrants in large cities, especially in fields such as nursing and teaching but also through orphanages, widows' homes, and housing for young, single women in domestic work. Although many Irish communities built parish schools run by nuns, the majority of Irish parents in large cities in the East enrolled their children in the public school system, where daughters or granddaughters of Irish immigrants had already established themselves as teachers.

=== Discrimination ===
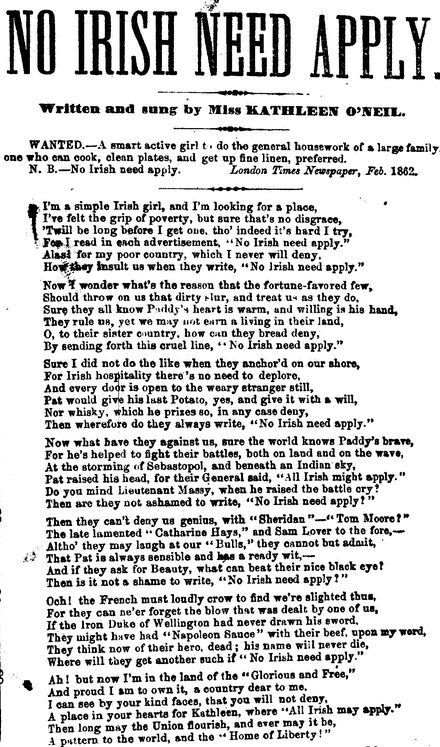
1862 song (Female version)

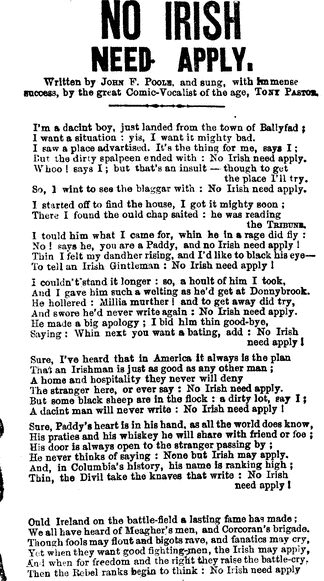
1862 song that used the "No Irish Need Apply" slogan. It was copied from a similar London song.

Anti-Irish sentiment was rampant in the United States during the 19th and early 20th centuries. Rising anti-Catholic and Nativist sentiments among Protestant Americans led to increasing discrimination against Irish Americans in the 1850s. Prejudice against Irish Catholics in the U.S. reached a peak in the mid-1850s with the founding of the Know Nothing Movement, which tried to oust Catholics from public office. After a year or two of local success, the Know Nothing Party vanished.

Catholics and Protestants kept their distance; intermarriage between Catholics and Protestants was uncommon, and strongly discouraged by both Protestant ministers and Catholic priests. As Dolan notes, "'Mixed marriages', as they were called, were allowed in rare cases, though warned against repeatedly, and were uncommon." Rather, intermarriage was primarily with other ethnic groups who shared their religion. Irish Catholics, for example, would commonly intermarry with German Catholics or Poles in the Midwest and Italians in the Northeast.

Irish-American journalists "scoured the cultural landscape for evidence of insults directed at the Irish in America." Much of what historians know about hostility to the Irish comes from their reports in Irish and in Democratic newspapers.

While the parishes were struggling to build parochial schools, many Catholic children attended public schools. The Protestant King James Version of the Bible was widely used in public schools, but Catholics were forbidden by their church from reading or reciting from it. Many Irish children complained that Catholicism was openly mocked in the classroom. In New York City, the curriculum vividly portrayed Catholics, and specifically the Irish, as villainous.

The Catholic archbishop John Hughes, an immigrant to America from County Tyrone, Ireland, campaigned for public funding of Catholic education in response to the bigotry. While never successful in obtaining public money for private education, the debate with the city's Protestant elite spurred by Hughes' passionate campaign paved the way for the secularization of public education nationwide. In addition, Catholic higher education expanded during this period with colleges and universities that evolved into such institutions as Fordham University and Boston College providing alternatives to Irish who were not otherwise permitted to apply to other colleges.

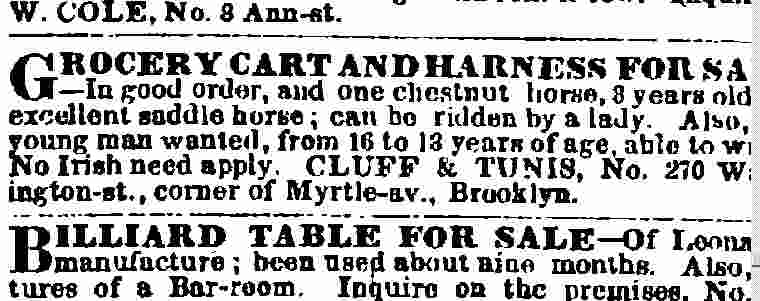
New York Times want ad 1854—the only New York Times ad with NINA for men.

Many Irish work gangs were hired by contractors to build canals, railroads, city streets and sewers across the country. In the South, they underbid slave labor. One result was that small cities that served as railroad centers came to have large Irish populations.

In 1895, the Knights of Equity was founded, to combat discrimination against Irish Catholics in the U.S., and to assist them financially when needed.

==== Stereotypes ====
Irish Catholics were popular targets of stereotyping in the 19th century. According to historian George Potter, the media often stereotyped the Irish in America as being boss-controlled, violent (both among themselves and with those of other ethnic groups), voting illegally, prone to alcoholism and dependent on street gangs that were often violent or criminal. Potter quotes contemporary newspaper images:

You will scarcely ever find an Irishman dabbling in counterfeit money, or breaking into houses, or swindling; but if there is any fighting to be done, he is very apt to have a hand in it." Even though Pat might "'meet with a friend and for love knock him down,'" noted a Montreal paper, the fighting usually resulted from a sudden excitement, allowing there was "but little 'malice prepense' in his whole composition." The Catholic Telegraph of Cincinnati in 1853, saying that the "name of 'Irish' has become identified in the minds of many, with almost every species of outlawry," distinguished the Irish vices as "not of a deep malignant nature," arising rather from the "transient burst of undisciplined passion," like "drunk, disorderly, fighting, etc., not like robbery, cheating, swindling, counterfeiting, slandering, calumniating, blasphemy, using obscene language, &c.

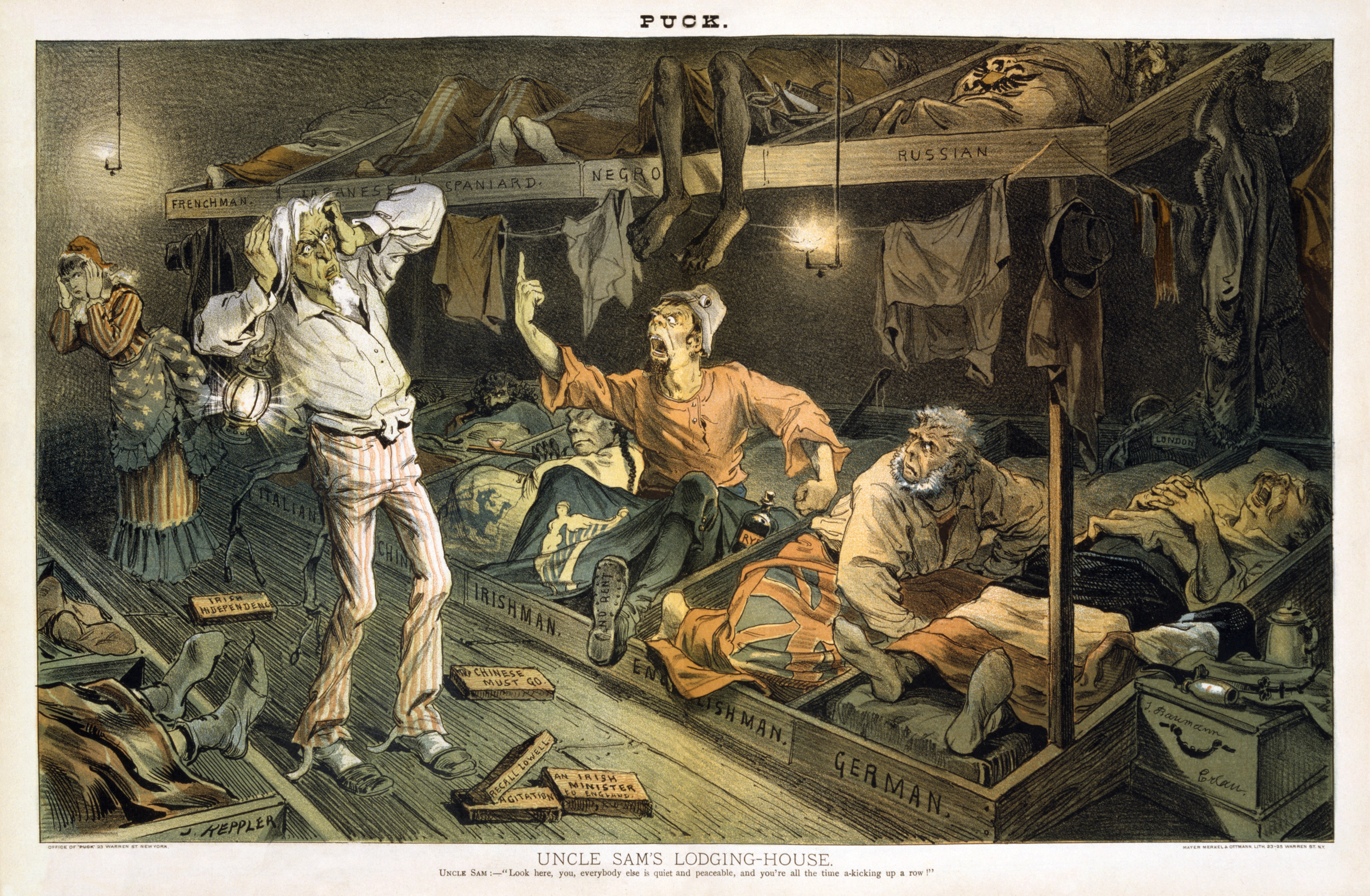
1882 illustration from Puck depicting Irish immigrants as troublemakers, as compared to those of other nationalities

The Irish had many humorists of their own, but were scathingly attacked in political cartoons, especially those in Puck magazine from the 1870s to 1900; it was edited by secular Germans who opposed the Catholic Irish in politics. In addition, the cartoons of Thomas Nast were especially hostile; for example, he depicted the Irish-dominated Tammany Hall machine in New York City as a ferocious tiger.

The stereotype of the Irish as violent drunks has lasted well beyond its high point in the mid-19th century. For example, President Richard Nixon once told advisor Charles Colson that "[t]he Irish have certain — for example, the Irish can't drink. What you always have to remember with the Irish is they get mean. Virtually every Irish I've known gets mean when he drinks. Particularly the real Irish."

Discrimination against Irish Americans differed depending on gender. For example, Irish women were sometimes stereotyped as "reckless breeders" because some American Protestants feared high Catholic birth rates would eventually result in a Protestant minority. Many native-born Americans claimed that "their incessant childbearing [would] ensure an Irish political takeover of American cities [and that] Catholicism would become the reigning faith of the hitherto Protestant nation." Irish men were also targeted, but in a different way than women were. The difference between the Irish female "Bridget" and the Irish male "Pat" was distinct; while she was impulsive but fairly harmless, he was "always drunk, eternally fighting, lazy, and shiftless". In contrast to the view that Irish women were shiftless, slovenly and stupid (like their male counterparts), girls were said to be "industrious, willing, cheerful, and honest—they work hard, and they are very strictly moral".

There were also Social Darwinian-inspired excuses for the discrimination of the Irish in America. Many Americans believed that since the Irish were Celts and not Anglo-Saxons, they were racially inferior and deserved second-class citizenship. The Irish being of inferior intelligence was a belief held by many Americans. This notion was held due to the fact that the Irish topped the charts demographically in terms of arrests and imprisonment. They also had more people confined to insane asylums and poorhouses than any other group. The racial supremacy belief that many Americans had at the time contributed significantly to Irish discrimination.

From the 1860s onwards, Irish Americans were stereotyped as terrorists and gangsters, although this stereotyping began to diminish by the end of the 19th century. This image as terrorists emerged due to the antics of the Fenian Brotherhood and its associated organizations. Expeditions across the border into Canada to battle British forces and the dynamite campaign of the 1880s contributed to American fears of the radical and unstable nature of the Irish and beliefs of racial inferiority.

=== Contributions to American culture ===
The annual celebration of Saint Patrick's Day is a widely recognized symbol of the Irish presence in America. The largest celebration of the holiday takes place in New York, where the annual St. Patrick's Day Parade draws an average of two million people. The second-largest celebration is held in Boston. The South Boston Parade is one of the United States's oldest, dating back to 1737. Savannah, Georgia, also holds one of the largest parades in the United States.

While these archetypal images are especially well known, Irish Americans have contributed to U.S. culture in a wide variety of fields: the fine and performing arts, film, literature, politics, sports, and religion. The Irish-American contribution to popular entertainment is reflected in the careers of figures such as James Cagney, Bing Crosby, Walt Disney, John Ford, Judy Garland, Gene Kelly, Grace Kelly, Tyrone Power, Chuck Connors, Ada Rehan, Jena Malone, and Spencer Tracy. Irish-born actress Maureen O'Hara, who became an American citizen, defined for U.S. audiences the archetypal, feisty Irish "colleen" in popular films such as The Quiet Man and The Long Gray Line. More recently, the Irish-born Pierce Brosnan gained screen celebrity as James Bond. During the early years of television, popular figures with Irish roots included Gracie Allen, Art Carney, Joe Flynn, Jackie Gleason, Luke Gordon, and Ed Sullivan.

The Irish American contribution to politics spans the entire ideological spectrum. Two prominent American socialists, Mary Harris "Mother" Jones and Elizabeth Gurley Flynn, were Irish Americans. In the 1960s, Irish-American writer Michael Harrington became an influential advocate of social welfare programs. Harrington's views profoundly influenced President John F. Kennedy and his brother, Robert F. Kennedy. Meanwhile, Irish-American political writer William F. Buckley emerged as a major intellectual force in American conservative politics in the latter half of the 20th century. Buckley's magazine, National Review, proved an effective advocate of successful Republican candidates such as Ronald Reagan.

Notorious Irish Americans include the legendary New Mexico outlaw Billy the Kid. Many historians believe he was born in New York City to Famine-era immigrants from Ireland. Mary Mallon, also known as Typhoid Mary, was an Irish immigrant, as was madam Josephine Airey, who also went by the name of "Chicago Joe" Hensley. New Orleans socialite and murderer Delphine LaLaurie, whose maiden name was Macarty, was of partial paternal Irish ancestry. Irish-American mobsters include, amongst others, Dean O'Banion, Jack "Legs" Diamond, Buddy McLean, Howie Winter and Whitey Bulger. Lee Harvey Oswald, the assassin of John F. Kennedy, had an Irish-born great-grandmother by the name of Mary Tonry. Colorful Irish Americans also include Margaret Tobin of RMS Titanic fame, scandalous model Evelyn Nesbit, dancer Isadora Duncan, San Francisco madam Tessie Wall, and Nellie Cashman, nurse and gold prospector in the American West.

==== Music ====
The wide popularity of Celtic music has fostered the rise of Irish American bands that draw heavily on traditional Irish themes and music. Such groups include New York City's Black 47, founded in the late 1980s, blending punk rock, rock and roll, Irish music, rap/hip-hop, reggae, and soul; and the Dropkick Murphys, a Celtic punk band formed in Quincy, Massachusetts, nearly a decade later. The Decemberists, a band featuring Irish-American singer Colin Meloy, released "Shankill Butchers", a song that deals with the Ulster Loyalist gang of the same name. The song appears on their album The Crane Wife. Flogging Molly, led by Dublin-born Dave King, are relative newcomers building upon this new tradition.

==== Food ====
Irish immigrants brought many traditional Irish recipes with them when they emigrated to the United States, which they adapted to meet the different ingredients available to them there. Irish Americans introduced foods like soda bread and colcannon to American cuisine. The famous Irish American meal of corned beef and cabbage was developed by Irish immigrants in the U.S., who adapted it from the traditional Irish recipe for bacon and cabbage. Irish beer such as Guinness is widely consumed in the United States, including an estimated 13 million pints on Saint Patrick's Day alone.

==== Sports ====
Starting with the sons of the famine generation, the Irish dominated baseball and boxing, and played a major role in other sports.

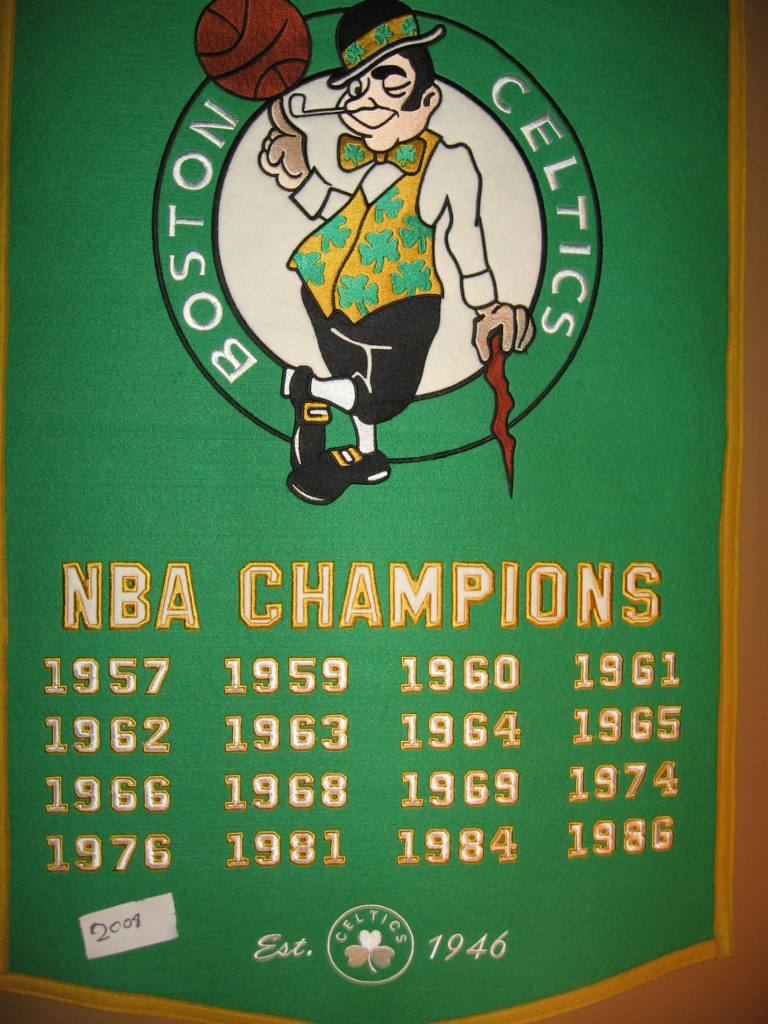
Logo of the Boston Celtics basketball team

Famous in their day were NFL quarterbacks and Super Bowl champions John Elway and Tom Brady, NBA forward Rick Barry, tennis greats Jimmy Connors and John McEnroe, baseball pitcher Nolan Ryan, baseball shortstop Derek Jeter, basketball point guard Jason Kidd, boxing legend Jack Dempsey and Muhammad Ali, world champion pro surfer Kelly Slater, national champion skier Ryan Max Riley, and legendary golfer Ben Hogan.

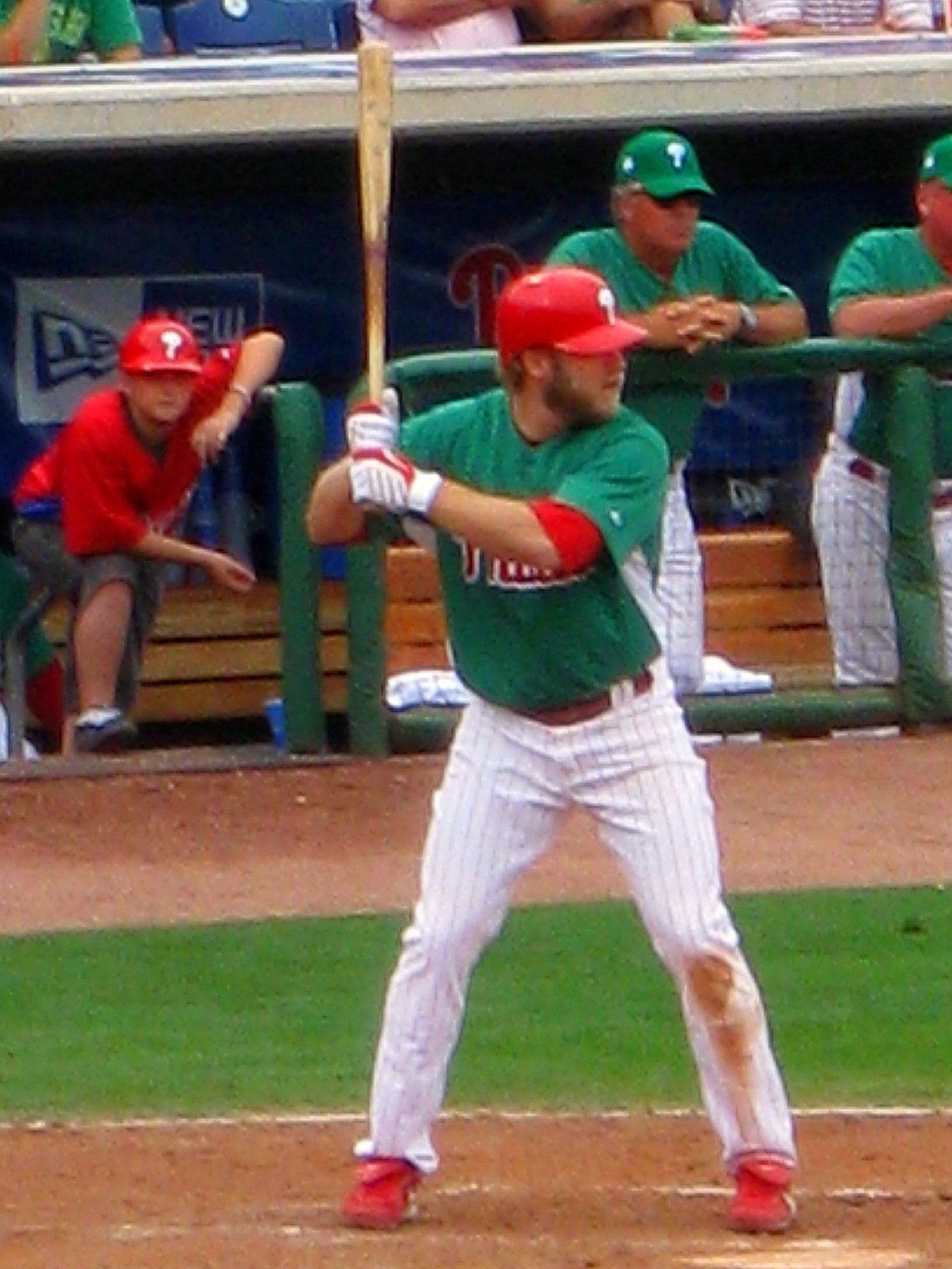
The Philadelphia Phillies started the tradition of wearing green uniforms on St. Patrick's day.

The Irish dominated professional baseball in the late 19th century, making up a third or more of the players and many of the top stars and managers. The professional teams played in northeastern cities with large Irish populations that provided a fan base, as well as training for ambitious youth. Casway argues that:

Baseball for Irish kids was a shortcut to the American dream and to self-indulgent glory and fortune. By the mid-1880s these young Irish men dominated the sport and popularized a style of play that was termed heady, daring, and spontaneous.... Ed Delahanty personified the flamboyant, exciting spectator-favorite, the Casey-at-the-bat, Irish slugger. The handsome masculine athlete who is expected to live as large as he played.

Irish stars included Charles Comiskey, Connie Mack, Michael "King" Kelly, Roger Connor, Eddie Collins, Roger Bresnahan, Ed Walsh and New York Giants manager John McGraw. The large 1945 class of inductees enshrined in the National Baseball Hall of Fame in Cooperstown included nine Irish Americans.

The Philadelphia Phillies always play at home during spring training on St. Patrick's Day. The Phillies hold the distinction of being the first baseball team to wear green uniforms on St. Patrick's Day. The tradition was started by Phillies pitcher Tug McGraw, who dyed his uniform green the night before March 17, 1981.

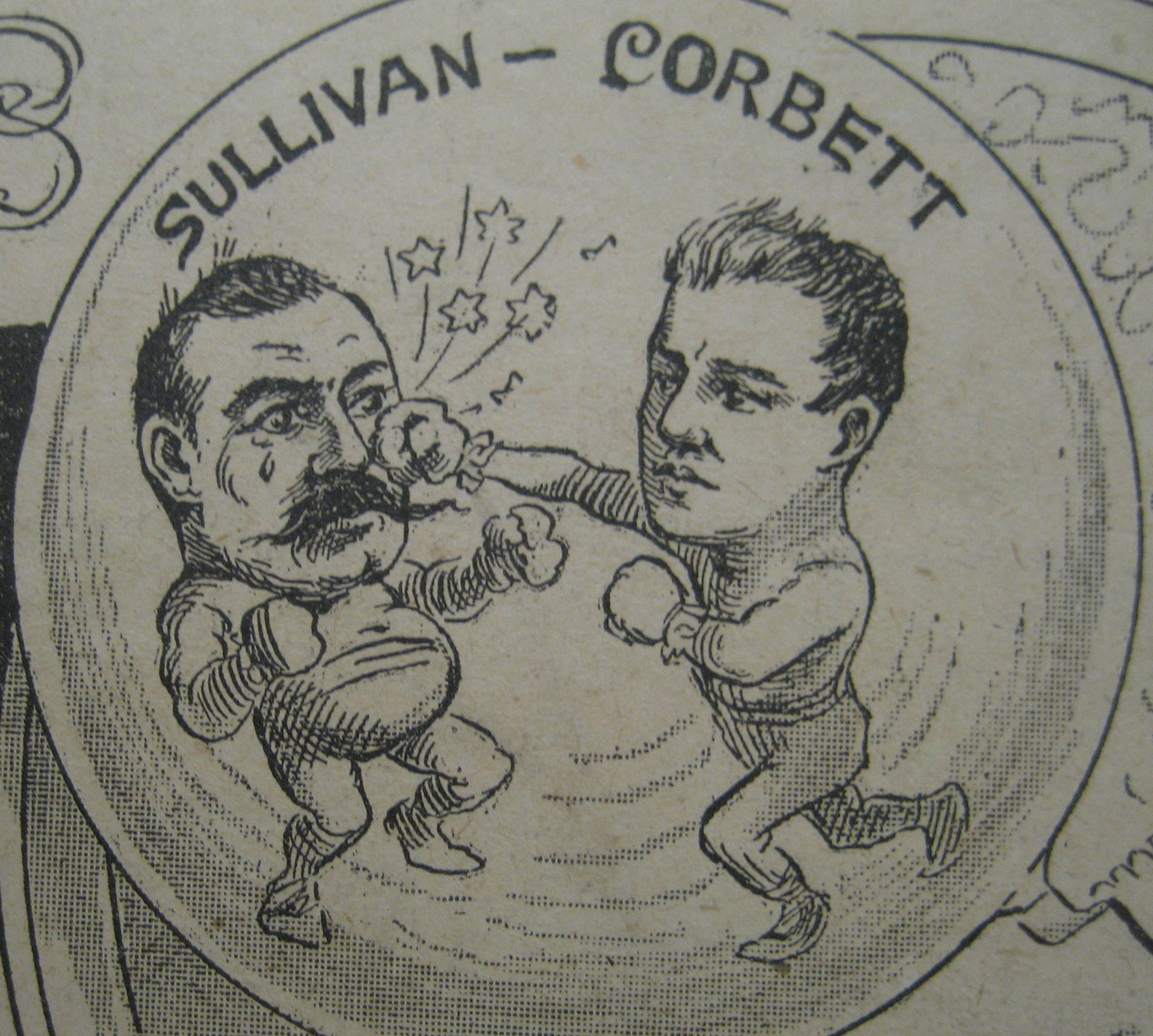
Two Irish stars: "Gentleman Jim" Corbett licks John L. Sullivan in 1892

John L. Sullivan (1858–1918), The heavyweight boxing champion, was the first of the modern sports superstars, winning scores of contests – perhaps as many as 200—with a purse that reached the sum of one million dollars.

The Irish brought their native games of handball, hurling and Gaelic football to America. Along with camogie, these sports are part of the Gaelic Athletic Association. The North American GAA organization is still strong, with 128 clubs across its ten divisions.

==== Entertainment ====
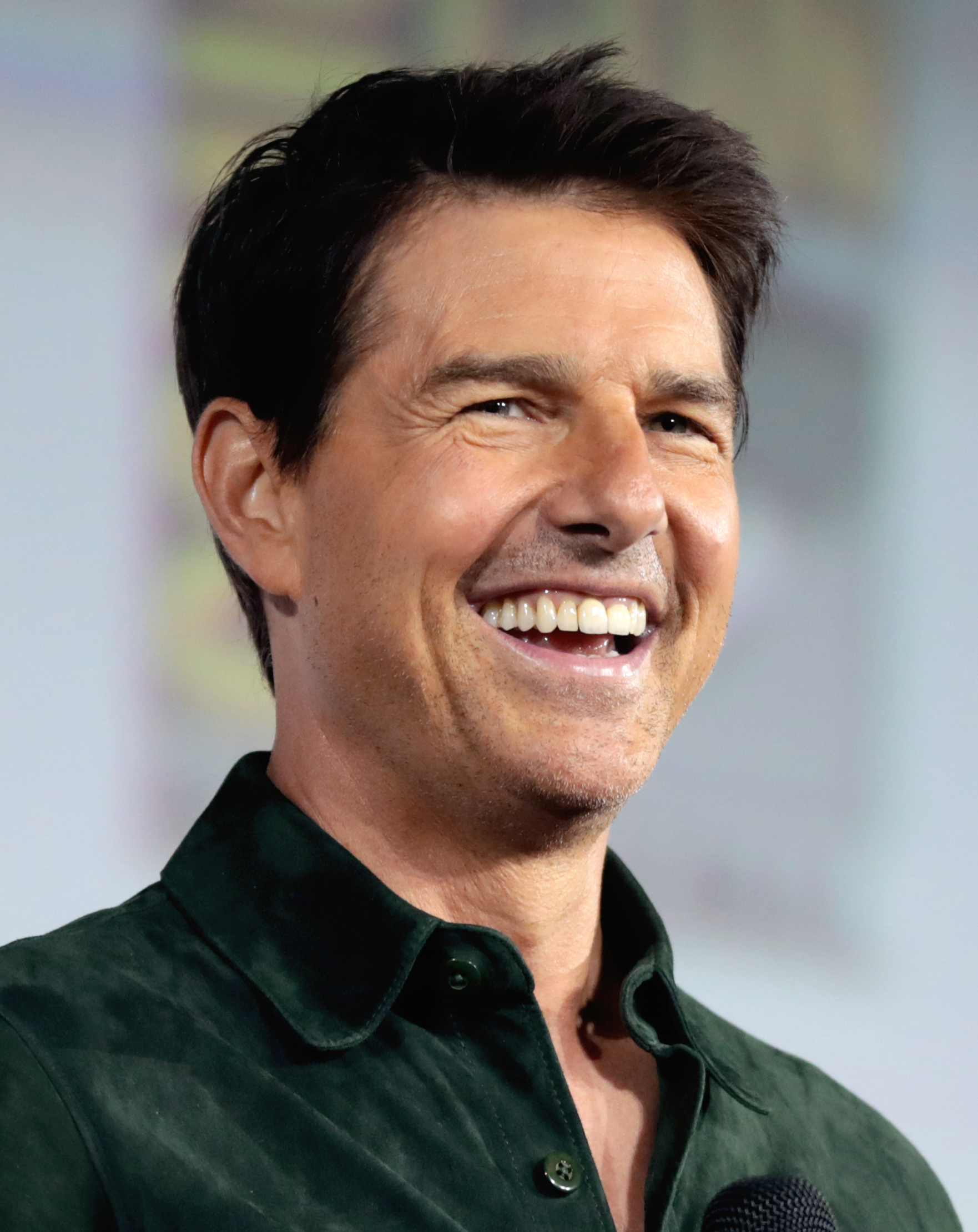
Actor Tom Cruise descends from paternal Irish ("Cruise" and "O'Mara") lineage around County Dublin.

Irish Americans have been prominent in comedy. Notable comedians of Irish descent include Jimmy Dore, Jackie Gleason, George Carlin, Bill Burr, Bill Murray, Will Ferrell, Louis C.K., Shane Gillis, Bryan Callen, Pete Holmes, Joe Rogan, Ben Stiller, Chris Farley, Stephen Colbert, Conan O'Brien, Denis Leary (holds dual American and Irish citizenship), Colin Quinn, Charles Nelson Reilly, Bill Maher, Molly Shannon, John Mulaney, Kathleen Madigan, Jimmy Fallon, Des Bishop, and Jim Gaffigan, among others.

Musicians of Irish descent include Billie Eilish, Christina Aguilera, Kelly Clarkson, Kurt Cobain, Bing Crosby, Tori Kelly, Tim McGraw, Mandy Moore, Hilary Duff, Fergie, Jerry Garcia, Judy Garland, Katy Perry, Tom Petty, Pink, Michael McDonald, Bruce Springsteen, Gwen Stefani, Lindsay Lohan, Mariah Carey, George M. Cohan, Paris Hilton, Alicia Keys and others.

==== Holidays ====
Halloween is of Irish origin.

=== Sense of heritage ===
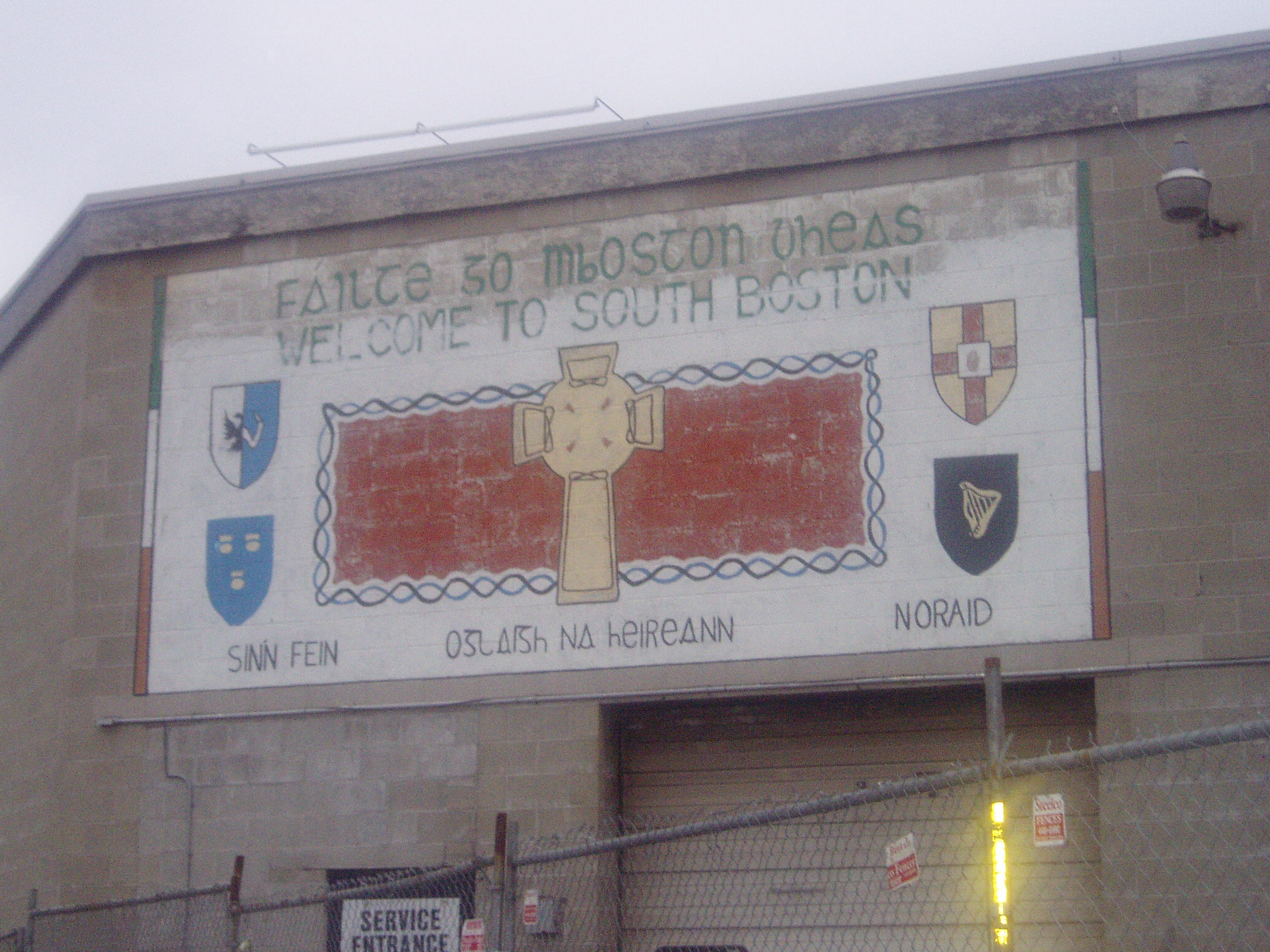
Irish Republican mural in South Boston, Massachusetts

Many Americans of Irish descent still identify their ethnicity as Irish.

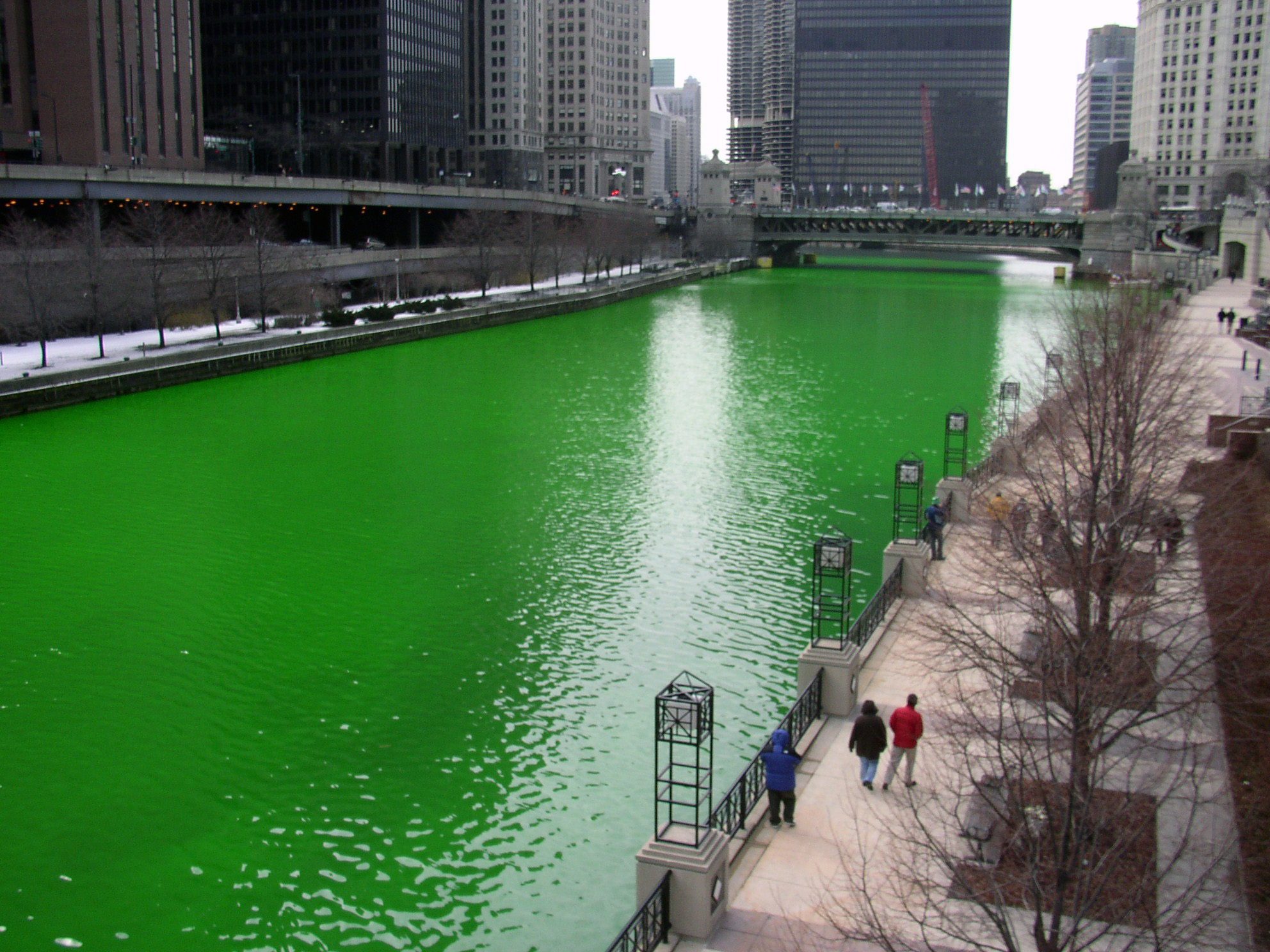
The Chicago River, dyed green for the 2005 St. Patrick's Day celebration

Movements like the Fenian Brotherhood were early examples of a history of the Irish diaspora in America continuing to support Irish independence from the United Kingdom. The Fenian Brotherhood was a specific movement based in the United States that launched several unsuccessful attacks on British-controlled Canada known as the "Fenian Raids" in the 1860s. The Friends of Irish Freedom raised millions of dollars from its inception in 1916 until 1932. The Irish Republican organization Clan na Gael also provided large amounts of money and support for Irish republican movements in Ireland. The Irish American fund-raising organization NORAID (founded by Irish immigrant and former IRA veteran Michael Flannery) received money from Irish American donators, officially stated to support the families of imprisoned or dead Provisional Irish Republican Army members—in 1984, the U.S. Department of Justice succeeded in forcing NORAID to acknowledge the Provisional IRA as its "foreign principal" under the Foreign Agents Registration Act.

Irish heritage organizations, such as the Ancient Order of Hibernians, intend to foster and promote the preservation of Irish culture, including dance, language, music, and sports in the United States.

Many Americans continue to celebrate Saint Patrick’s Day. Traditionally, corned beef and boiled cabbage are served in Irish-American households. This dish is not of direct Irish origin. Instead, it originated in the Northeastern United States. Corned beef’s popularity relative to back bacon among the Irish immigrant population may have been due to corned beef being considered a luxury product in Ireland. In the United States, it was cheap and readily available. It is said that Irish immigrants originally purchased corned beef from Jewish butchers.

Some Americans, both of Irish descent and otherwise, have been occasionally criticized over misunderstandings of Irish culture, or a disconnect from the cultural evolution and daily realities of modern Ireland, The term "Plastic Paddy" originally was coined by the British media in response to musician Shane MacGowan after he released Streets of Sorrow/Birmingham Six, and was thereafter frequently applied to the working class British Irish who inhabited English cities such as London and Manchester, often by Irish university graduates from South Dublin who emigrated to the United Kingdom in the 1990s. With the rise of globalization and the internet, this term against the Irish Diaspora has been extended to refer to Americans of Irish ancestry as a whole in the 2000s and 2010s, whose ties to Ireland are dismissed by the newly cosmopolitan Irish upper middle class as tenuous.

Certain American conservatives have also been criticized for making exaggerated claims about the treatment of the Irish within the United States in comparison to the treatment of other minority groups in the United States, particularly in the context of attempting to delegitimize inequalities certain groups may face by comparing the circumstances of the Irish to these groups. Such parties have faced criticisms for exaggerating the oppression of the Irish within the United States relative to the oppression that other disenfranchised groups within the United States faced, not acknowledging the general assimilation of the Irish into the general concept of Whiteness in America.

== Demographics ==
=== Cities ===
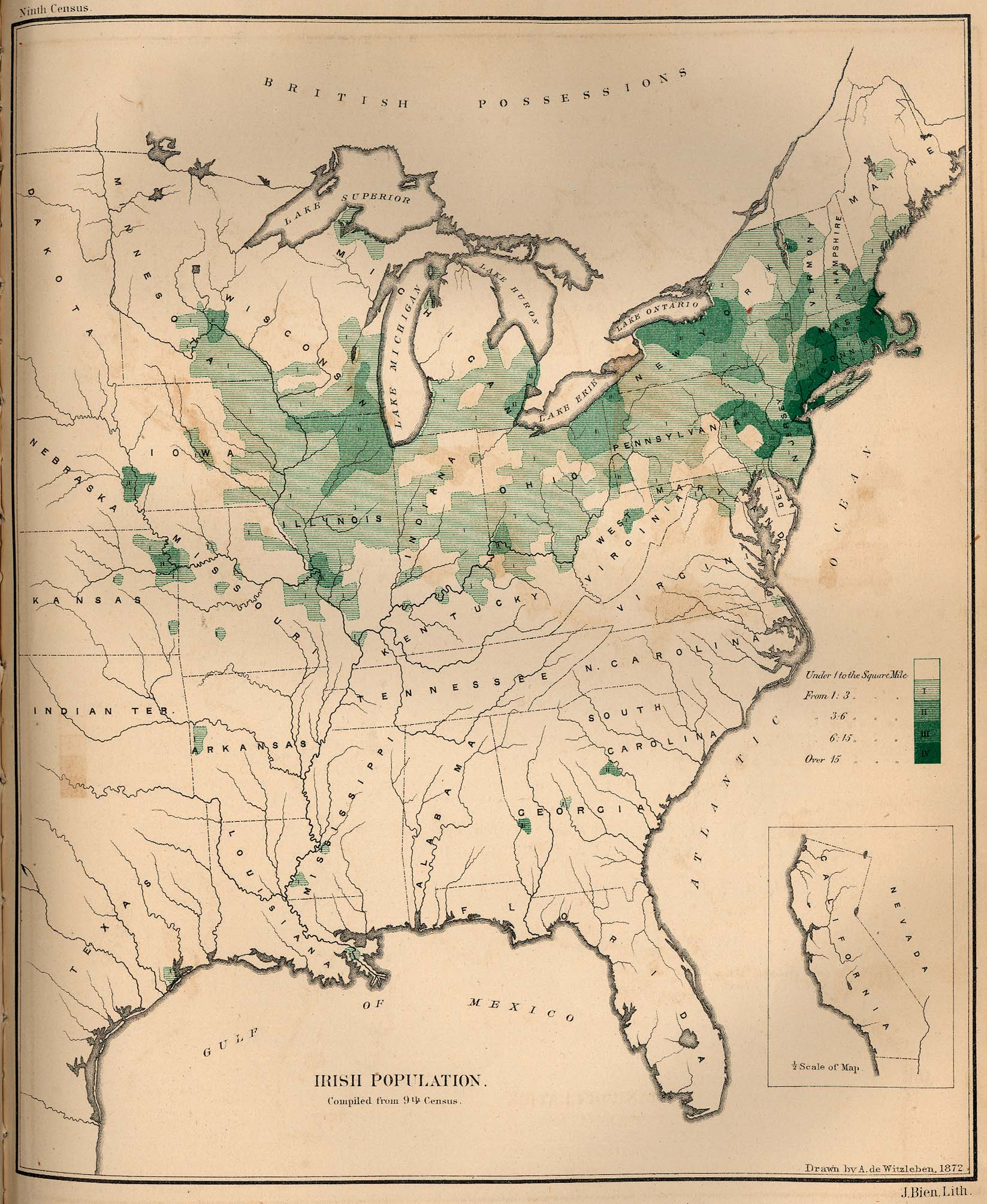
Population density of people born in Ireland, 1870; these were mostly Catholics; the older Scots Irish immigration is not shown.

The vast majority of Irish Catholic Americans settled in large and small cities across the North, particularly railroad centers and mill towns. They became perhaps the most urbanized group in America, as few became farmers. Areas that retain a significant Irish American population include the metropolitan areas of Boston, New York City, Philadelphia, Wyoming Valley, Providence, Hartford, Pittsburgh, Buffalo, Albany, Syracuse, Baltimore, St. Louis, Chicago, Cleveland, San Francisco, Savannah, and Los Angeles, where most new arrivals of the 1830–1910 period settled. As a percentage of the population, Massachusetts has the greatest percentage of people with Irish ancestry, with around 21.2% of the population claiming Irish descent. Likewise the United States' towns and cities with the highest percentage of Irish-descended Americans are in Massachusetts. These are the towns of Scituate, Massachusetts, with 47.5% of its residents being of Irish descent; Milton, Massachusetts, with 44.6% of its 26,000 being of Irish descent; and Braintree, Massachusetts, with 46.5% of its 34,000 being of Irish descent. (Weymouth, Massachusetts, at 39% of its 54,000 citizens, and Quincy, Massachusetts, at 34% of its population of 90,000, are the cities with the highest Irish-descended population within the United States. Squantum, a peninsula in the northern part of Quincy, is the neighborhood with the highest amount of Irish-descended people with the United States, with close to 60% of its 2600 residents claiming Irish descent.)

Philadelphia, Boston, New York, and Chicago have historically had neighborhoods with higher percentages of Irish American residents. Regionally, the most Irish American states are Massachusetts, New Hampshire, Maine, Vermont, Rhode Island, Delaware, Pennsylvania, and Connecticut, according to the U.S. Census Bureau American Community Survey in 2013. In consequence of its unique history as a mining center, Butte, Montana, is also one of the country's most thoroughly Irish American cities. Smaller towns, such as Greeley, Nebraska (population 466), with an estimated 51.7% of the residents identifying as Irish American as of 2009–13 were part of the Irish Catholic Colonization effort of Bishop O'Connor of New York in the 1880s.

==== 2020 population of Irish ancestry by state ====
As of 2020, the distribution of Irish Americans across the 50 states and DC is as presented in the following table:

(Republic of Ireland) Estimated Irish American population by state (United States)
State	Number	Percentage
Alabama	392,052	8.01%
Alaska	71,425	9.69%
Arizona	617,231	8.60%
Arkansas	283,345	9.41%
California	2,331,714	5.93%
Colorado	619,321	10.89%
Connecticut	537,144	15.04%
Delaware	137,609	14.22%
District of Columbia	49,498	7.05%
Florida	1,776,586	8.37%
Georgia	738,036	7.02%
Hawaii	62,439	4.40%
Idaho	159,301	9.08%
Illinois	1,401,831	11.02%
Indiana	697,417	10.41%
Iowa	409,015	12.98%
Kansas	329,541	11.31%
Kentucky	500,792	11.22%
Louisiana	305,477	6.55%
Maine	223,464	16.67%
Maryland	594,307	9.84%
Massachusetts	1,354,532	19.71%
Michigan	1,017,747	10.20%
Minnesota	560,185	10.00%
Mississippi	201,669	6.76%
Missouri	750,732	12.26%
Montana	144,683	13.63%
Nebraska	229,468	11.93%
Nevada	246,595	8.14%
New Hampshire	278,913	20.58%
New Jersey	1,181,301	13.29%
New Mexico	127,440	6.08%
New York	2,167,420	11.11%
North Carolina	832,880	8.02%
North Dakota	56,241	7.40%
Ohio	1,480,335	12.68%
Oklahoma	400,967	10.15%
Oregon	460,088	11.02%
Pennsylvania	1,978,043	15.46%
Rhode Island	182,012	17.21%
South Carolina	435,703	8.56%
South Dakota	88,957	10.12%
Tennessee	628,562	9.28%
Texas	1,745,532	6.10%
Utah	185,927	5.90%
Vermont	103,241	16.54%
Virginia	767,238	9.02%
Washington	759,024	10.10%
West Virginia	232,834	12.88%
Wisconsin	615,730	10.60%
Wyoming	66,585	11.45%
United States	31,518,129	9.65%

=== Irish-American communities ===
According to the 2010 U.S. Census, the city of Butte, Montana has the highest percentage of Irish Americans per capita of any city in the United States, with around one-quarter of the population reporting Irish ancestry. Butte's Irish Catholic population originated with the waves of Irish immigrants who arrived in the city in the late-nineteenth century to work in the industrial mines. By population Boston and Philadelphia have the two largest Irish American populations in the country.

There are Irish neighborhoods scattered all throughout Boston, most notably South Boston. Many of Philadelphia's Irish neighborhoods are located in the Northeast Philadelphia section of the city, particularly in the Fishtown, Mayfair, and Kensington neighborhoods, as well as the South Philadelphia section, most notably the Pennsport ("Two Street" to the locals) neighborhood. There are large Irish populations in the Boston and Philadelphia metropolitan areas as well. The South Side of Chicago, Illinois also has a large Irish community, who refer to themselves as the South Side Irish.

There are approximately 10,000 Irish Travelers living in the United States.

=== Socioeconomic demographics and status ===
In 2023 Irish Americans had a per capita income of $53,408, higher than $43,313 which is the per capita income for the total population and higher than $50,675 for all white Americans. Irish-Italian-American males and females had median earnings of $75,488 and $61,660, respectively. This is higher than $63,975 and $52,370 for the total population. Irish Americans have a median household income of $88,257 which is higher than the total population and all non-Hispanic whites despite having a smaller household size (2.29) than the total population.

In terms of education, Irish Americans are significantly more educated than the total population. 96.2% have graduated from high school, and 44.3% have attained a bachelor's degree or higher.

64% of Irish Americans are in the workplace, with 51.1% working in management, business, science, and arts occupations. The Irish-American community also has a large population working in sales and office occupations (19.8%). In terms of industry, a large number of Irish Americans work in educational services, and health care and social assistance as well as professional, scientific, and management, and administrative and waste management services and retail trade.

== People ==
=== In politics and government ===
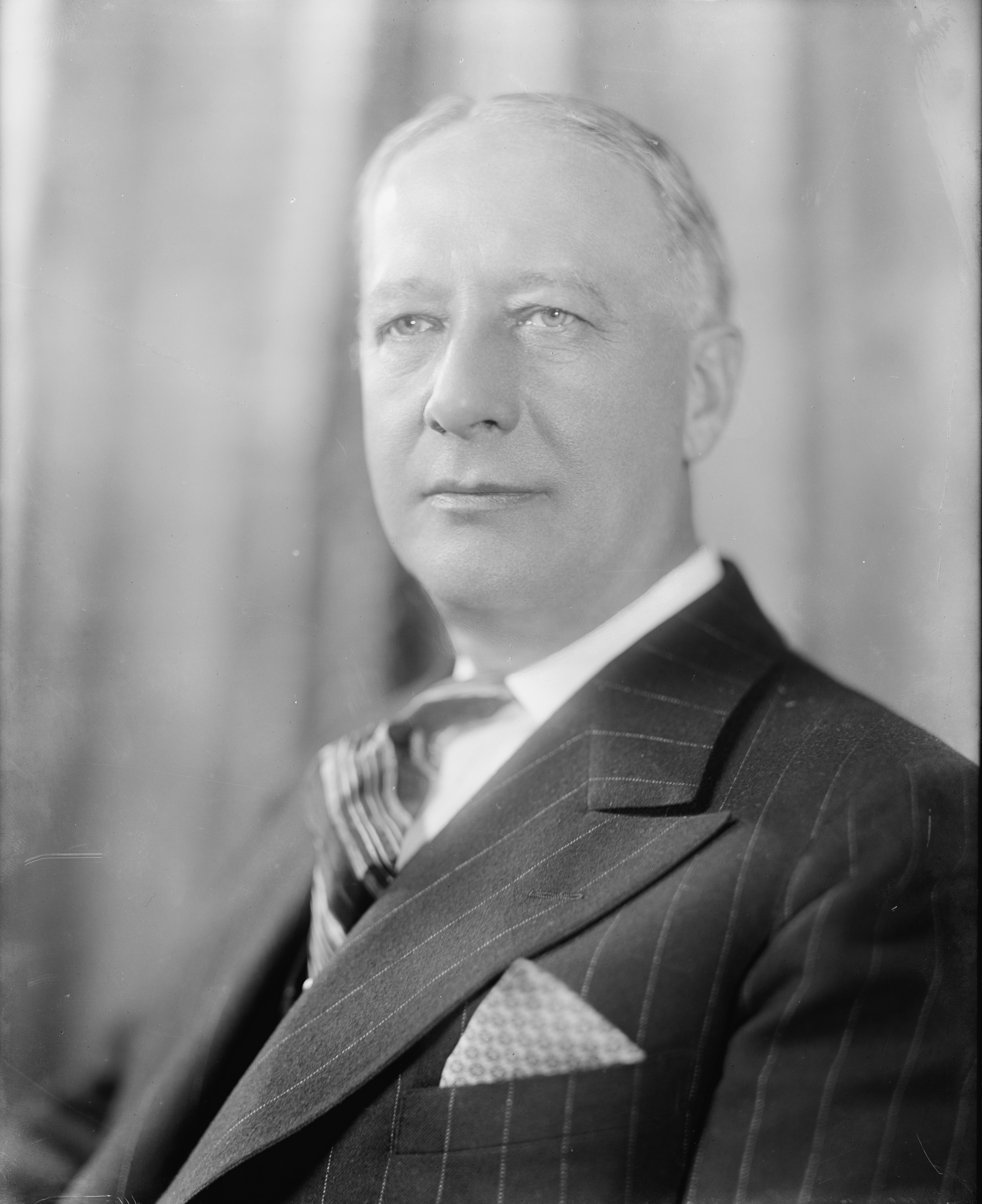
1928 Democratic Presidential Nominee Al Smith was the first Irish Catholic nominee of a major political party.

By the 1850s, the Irish were already a major presence in the police departments of large cities. In New York City in 1855, of the city's 1,149 policemen, 305 were natives of Ireland. Within 30 years, Irish Americans in the NYPD were almost twice their proportion of the city's population. Both Boston's police and fire departments provided many Irish immigrants with their first jobs. The creation of a unified police force in Philadelphia opened the door to the Irish in that city. By 1860 in Chicago, 49 of the 107 on the police force were Irish. Chief O'Leary headed the police force in New Orleans, and Malachi Fallon was chief of police of San Francisco.

The Irish Catholic diaspora since 1850 have produced a majority of the leaders of the U.S. Catholic Church, labor unions, the Democratic Party in larger cities, and Catholic high schools, colleges and universities.

The cities of Milwaukee (Tom Barrett; 2004-) and Detroit (Mike Duggan; 2012-) currently (as of 2018) have Irish American mayors. Pittsburgh mayor Bob O'Connor died in office in 2006. New York City has had at least three Irish-born mayors and over eight Irish American mayors. The most recent one was County Mayo native William O'Dwyer, first elected in 1945. Beginning in the 1909 mayoral election, every Democratic candidate for mayor of New York City was a man of Irish descent until 1950, when a special election saw three Italian Americans as the top vote getters.

The Irish Protestant vote has not been studied nearly as much. Historian Timothy J. Meagher argues that by the late 19th century, most of the Protestant Irish "turned their backs on all associations with Ireland and melted into the American Protestant mainstream." A minority insisted on a "Scots-Irish" identity.

In Canada, by contrast, Irish Protestants remained a political force, with many belonging to the Orange Order. It was an anti-Catholic social organization with chapters across Canada. It was most powerful during the late 19th century.

=== Political leanings ===
Al Smith and later John F. Kennedy were political heroes for American Catholics. Al Smith, who had an Irish mother and an Italian-German father, in 1928 became the first Catholic to run for president. From the 1830s to the 1960s, Irish Catholics voted heavily Democratic, with occasional exceptions like the 1920 United States presidential election. Their precincts showed average support levels of 80%. As historian Lawrence McCaffrey notes, "until recently they have been so closely associated with the Democratic party that Irish, Catholic, and Democrat composed a trinity of associations, serving mutual interests and needs. "

American politicians who identify as Irish have been prominent members of both the Republican and Democratic parties. Ronald Reagan, a Republican president, and Joe Biden, a Democrat president, both often spoke of their Irish heritage during their presidencies.

The great majority of Irish Catholic politicians were Democrats, with a few exceptions before 1970 such as Connecticut Senator John A. Danaher and Wisconsin Senator Joseph McCarthy. Today, Irish politicians are associated with both parties. Ronald Reagan boasted of his Irishness. Historically, Irish Catholics controlled prominent Democratic city organizations. Among the most prominent were New York, Philadelphia, Chicago, Boston, San Francisco, Pittsburgh, Jersey City, and Albany. Many served as chairmen of the Democratic National Committee, including County Monaghan native Thomas Taggart, Vance McCormick, James Farley, Edward J. Flynn, Robert E. Hannegan, J. Howard McGrath, William H. Boyle, Jr., John Moran Bailey, Larry O'Brien, Christopher J. Dodd, Terry McAuliffe and Tim Kaine. In Congress, the Irish are represented in both parties; currently, Susan Collins of Maine, Ed Markey of Massachusetts, Dan Sullivan of Alaska, Lisa Murkowski of Alaska, Dick Durbin of Illinois, Patrick Leahy of Vermont, and Maria Cantwell of Washington are Irish Americans serving in the United States Senate. Former Speaker of the House of Representatives and Vice Presidential Candidate Paul Ryan is another prominent Irish-American Republican. Exit polls show that in recent presidential elections Irish Catholics have split about 50–50 for Democratic and Republican candidates. The pro-life faction in the Democratic party includes many Irish Catholic politicians, such as the former Boston mayor and ambassador to the Vatican Ray Flynn and senator Bob Casey, Jr., who defeated Senator Rick Santorum in a high visibility race in Pennsylvania in 2006.

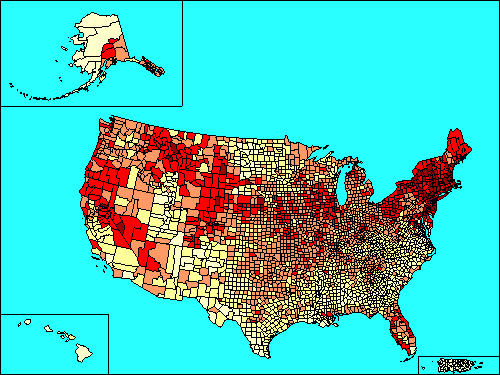
Distribution of Irish Americans according to the 2000 Census

In New York State where fusion voting is practiced, Irish Americans were instrumental in the founding of the Conservative party in opposition to Nelson Rockefeller and other liberal Republicans who dominated the state GOP during the 1960s and 70s. The party, founded by Irish American lawyers J. Daniel Mahoney and Kieran O'Doherty would serve as a vehicle for William F. Buckley when he ran for mayor of New York in 1965 against liberal WASP Republican John V. Lindsay and establishment Democrat Abe Beame. Elsewhere, significant majorities of the local Irish stayed with the Democratic party, such as in Massachusetts and in other parts of Southern New England.

In some heavily Irish small towns in northern New England and central New Jersey the Irish vote is quite Republican, but other places like Gloucester, New Jersey and Butte, Montana retain strongly liberal and Democratic-leaning Irish populations. In the 1984 United States Presidential Election Irish Catholics in Massachusetts voted 56% to 43% for Walter Mondale while their cousins in New York State voted 68% to 32% for Ronald Reagan.

The voting intentions of Irish Americans and other white ethnic groups attracted attention in the 2016 U.S. election. In the Democratic primaries, Boston's Irish were said to break strongly for Hillary Clinton, whose victories in Irish-heavy Boston suburbs may have helped her narrowly carry the state over Bernie Sanders. A 2016 March survey by Irish Central showed that 45% of Irish Americans nationwide supported Donald Trump, although the majority of those in Massachusetts supported Hillary Clinton. An October poll by Buzzfeed showed that Irish respondents nationwide split nearly evenly between Trump (40%) and Clinton (39%), with large numbers either undecided or supporting other candidates (21%), and that the Irish were more supportive of Clinton than all the other West European-descended Americans including fellow Catholic Italian Americans.

In early November 2016, six days before the election, another poll by IrishCentral showed Clinton ahead at 52% among Irish Americans, while Trump was at 40% and the third-party candidates together had 8%; Irish respondents in Massachusetts similarly favored Clinton by majority. In 2017, a survey with 3,181 Irish American respondents (slightly over half being beyond third generation) by Irish Times found that 41% identified as Democrats while 23% identified as Republicans; moreover, 45% used NBC (typically considered left-leaning) for their news while 36% used Fox News (considered right-leaning).

The presence of supporters of Trump among Irish and other white ethnic communities which had once themselves been marginalized immigrants generated controversy, with progressive Irish American media figures admonishing their co-ethnics against "myopia" and "amnesia". However, such criticisms by left leaning pundits were frequently leveled against Irish-American conservatives prior to Trump's presidential run, with one columnist from the liberal online magazine Salon calling Irish-American conservatives "disgusting". In New York City, ongoing trends of suburbanization, gentrification, and the increased tendency of Irish-Americans to vote Republican, as well as the increasingly left wing politics of the Democratic Party, led to the collapse of Irish political power in the city during the 2010s. This trend was exemplified by the defeat of Queens Representative and former House Democratic Caucus Chairman Joe Crowley by democratic socialist Alexandria Ocasio-Cortez in the 2018 Democratic primary. The 2020s have seen the emergence of a distinctly left-wing Irish-American identity, marked by the rise of groups such as New York Irish for Palestine, The Gurley Flynn Society, The New 32 Project, and the revitalization of the Charitable Irish Society of Boston.

==== Irish-American justices of the Supreme Court ====
- Joseph McKenna
- Edward D. White
- Pierce Butler
- Frank Murphy
- James Francis Byrnes
- William J. Brennan
- Anthony Kennedy
- Neil Gorsuch Partial maternal Irish ancestry
- Brett Kavanaugh
- Amy Coney Barrett

== See also ==
- 69th Infantry Regiment (New York)
- Ethnocultural politics in the United States
- Irish American Athletic Club
- Irish American Cultural Institute
- Irish-American Heritage Month
- Irish Americans in the American Civil War
- Irish Brigade (U.S.)
- Irish Mob, criminals in large cities
- Irish Race Conventions, 19th-century international conventions
- Irish Whales, athletes
- List of Irish Americans, notable individuals
- List of Irish-American Medal of Honor recipients, notable individuals
- List of Scotch-Irish Americans, notable individuals
- Saint Patrick's Battalion, Mexican–American War
- Irish Traveller Americans

== Other sources ==
- Corrigan, Michael, Confessions of a Shanty Irishman, 2014, Virtual Bookworm, eBook and audio book. ISBN 978-1602642973
