= Outward holiness =

Wesleyan–Arminian Christian concept

Outward holiness, or external holiness, is a Wesleyan–Arminian doctrine emphasizing holy living, service, modest dress and sober speech. Additionally, outward holiness manifests as "the expression of love through a life characterised by 'justice, mercy and truth'". It is a testimony of a Christian believer's regeneration, done in obedience to God. The doctrine is prevalent among denominations emerging during the revival movements, including the Methodists (especially those in the Holiness Movement), as well as Pentecostals. It is taken from 1 Peter 1:15: "He which hath called you is Holy, so be ye holy in all manner of conversation".

== History ==
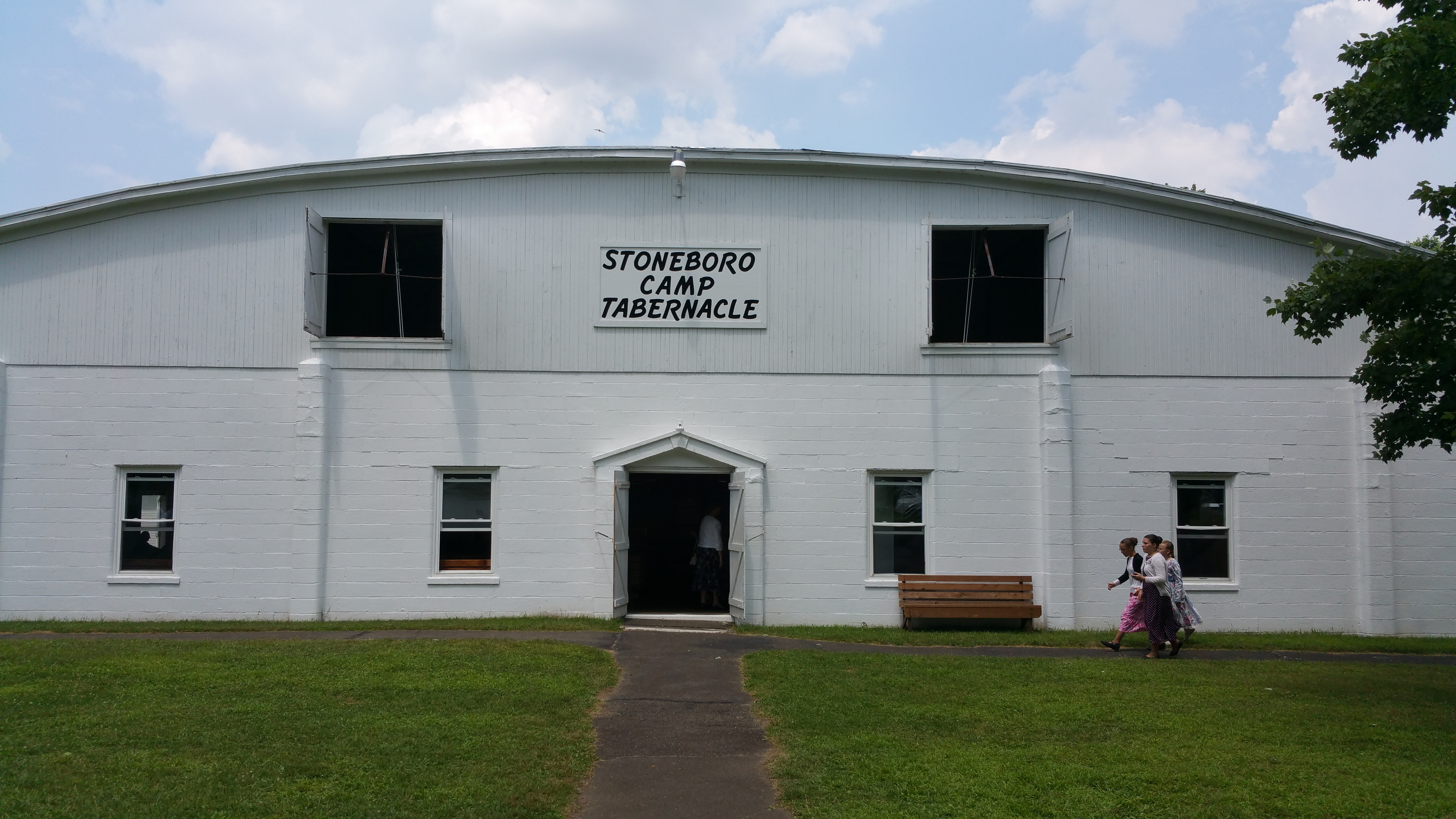
Wesleyan Methodist girls enter the tabernacle at a camp meeting.

In Methodist theology, in regeneration, a person has an "experience of God's Spirit enabling faith and new birth and witnessing that we are loved by God as God's children". As a result of the New Birth, an individual is transformed and into a new creature in Christ. Outward holiness manifests as "the expression of love through a life characterised by 'justice, mercy and truth'". This has led to an emphasis on the importance of holy living, which has included an emphasis on clean speech, modesty, and abstinence from alcohol. Outward holiness additionally included service to God and others, with the early Methodists being engaged in ministry, including "setting up schools for children (including a grammar text Wesley himself wrote), sick ministries, medical care, food and clothing distribution, ministry to unwed and destitute mothers, The Stranger's Friend Society (a charity for non-Methodists), ministry to paupers in London, establishing a home for widows in London, establishing an orphanage in Newcastle, unemployment relief, small business loan fund, and prison ministries".

The aspects of modesty and plain dress as related to outward holiness have been emphasized in early Methodism and in the holiness movement. According to Methodist theology held by the holiness movement, before the fall of man, "Nakedness was 'very good' from the beginning, but its innocence was corrupted by the fall", a concept taught in Genesis 1:31 and 2:25. Genesis 3:8–10 and Revelation 16:15 teach that after the fall of man, "publicly exposed nakedness is a symbol of the shame of sin". In Genesis 3:7, Adam and Eve tried to cover their nakedness, though their attempt was inadequate for God; this reflects the tendency in humans to "invent inadequate coverings for our nakedness". Genesis 3:21 and Revelation 3:18 teach that God properly clothed humans and that a "fully-clothed person is a God-ordained symbol of the full clothing of Christ's righteousness". Exodus 20:26 and 28:42–43 teach that nakedness is inclusive of anything that includes the torso and thighs. As taught in the early Christian text Paedagogus, the early Church stressed the importance of wearing modest clothing in the practice of Christianity, with the Church Father Clement of Alexandria declaring in it:

Woman and man are to go to church decently attired, with natural step, embracing silence, possessing unfeigned love, pure in body, pure in heart, fit to pray to God. Let the woman observe this, further. Let her be entirely covered, unless she happen to be at home. For that style of dress is grave, and protects from being gazed at. And she will never fall, who puts before her eyes modesty, and her shawl; nor will she invite another to fall into sin by uncovering her face. For this is the wish of the Word, since it is becoming for her to pray veiled.

— (The Instructor 3.11)

More specifically, with regard to proper apparel, Clement commanded:

As, then, in the fashioning of our clothes, we must keep clear of all strangeness, so in the use of them we must beware of extravagance. For neither is it seemly for the clothes to be above the knee, as they say was the case with the Lacedaemonian virgins; nor is it becoming for any part of a woman to be exposed. Though you may with great propriety use the language addressed to him who said, "Your arm is beautiful; yes, but it is not for the public gaze. Your thighs are beautiful but, was the reply, for my husband alone. And your face is comely. Yes; but only for him who has married me." But I do not wish chaste women to afford cause for such praises to those who, by praises, hunt after grounds of censure; and not only because it is prohibited to expose the ankle, but because it has been enjoined that the head should be veiled and the face covered; for it is a wicked thing for beauty to be a snare to men.

The Paedagogus teaches against the wearing of extravagant clothing, in addition to forbidding the wearing of jewelry. It emphasizes instead that people should seek piety. In the same vein, the Didascalia Apostolorum, an early Christian manual, directed: "Thou therefore who art a Christian [woman] [...] if thou wishest to be faithful, please thy husband only, and when thou walkest in the market-place, cover thy head with thy garment, that by thy veil the greatness of thy beauty may be covered; do not adorn the face of thine eyes, but look down and walk veiled; be watchful, not to wash in the baths with men."

Reviving these early Christian teachings on modesty as an integral part of Christian living, the founder of the Methodist Churches, John Wesley, emphasized "inward and outward holiness", which "emphasized the essential link between heart holiness and holy living". Outward holiness in the form of "right living and right actions" is practiced in obedience to God and as a testimony of faith after a person experiences the New Birth. The General Rules of the Methodist Church (1739), written up by the father of Methodism John Wesley, enjoin the faithful against "Doing what we know is not for the glory of God, as: The putting on of gold and costly apparel. The taking such diversions as cannot be used in the name of the Lord Jesus. The singing those songs, or reading those books, which do not tend to the knowledge or love of God. Softness and needless self-indulgence. Laying up treasure upon earth." The Shield of the Young Methodist notes that diversions "Diversions include those popular amusements—such as dancing, theaters, circuses, etc.—which divert or turn the heart away from God, to be fascinated by worldly things." With regard to that criminals are made "by reading bad books, bad newspapers, and blood-and-murder stories in cheap novels"; "such reading as glorifies cunning tricks, falsehood, the dirk and pistol, corupt the young and lead them in the paths of sin." Popular music "taints the heart and generates worldlness [and] must be avoided."

Early Methodists wore plain dress, with Methodist clergy condemning "high headdresses, ruffles, laces, gold, and 'costly apparel' in general". John Wesley, the founder of the Methodist movement, recommended that Methodists read his thoughts On Dress, in which he detailed acceptable types and colors of fabrics, in addition to "shapes and sizes of hats, coats, sleeves, and hairstyles"; in that sermon, John Wesley expressed his desire for Methodists: "Let me see, before I die, a Methodist congregation, full as plain dressed as a Quaker congregation." He also taught, with respect to Christian headcovering, that a woman, "especially in a religious assembly", should "keep on her veil". Those who tried to attend Methodist services in costly apparel were denied admittance. Wesley's teaching was based on his interpretation of 1 Timothy 2:9–10 and 1 Peter 3:3–4, which he stated led him to conclude that "expensive clothes puff up their wearers, promote vanity, incite anger, inflame lust, retard the pursuit of holiness, and steal from God and the poor." The 1858 Discipline of the Wesleyan Methodist Connection stated that "we would not only enjoin on all who fear God plain dress, but we would recommend to our preachers and people, according to Mr. Wesley's views expressed in his sermon on the inefficiency of Christianity, published but a few years before his death, and containing his matured judgment, distinguishing plainness—Plainness which will publicly comment them to the maintenance of their Christian profession wherever they may be." The "men among the Methodists all wore the low-crowned hat with a broad brim, and a shad-bellied coat, much after the fashion of a Quaker coat, and their women wore generally a long scoop black silk bonnet, plain, without any gay trimmings, plain dress and no ear-rings, nor any kind of ornaments". The 1859 novel Adam Bede portrayed the Methodist itinerant preacher, Dinah Morris, wearing plain dress, with the words "I saw she was a Methodist, or Quaker, or something of that sort, by her dress". In the 14 April 1903 edition of The Free Methodist, an article on "Woman in the Public Service" written by a bishop of the Free Methodist Church (a Methodist denomination aligned with the holiness movement), Walter Ashbel Sellew, taught the importance of the woman's headcovering and modest dress:

Perhaps the strongest passage of scripture in all the Bible which warrants women praying and preaching in public is that one which reads as follows: "But every woman that prayeth or prophesieth with her head uncovered dishonoreth her head, for that is all one as if she were shaven" (1 Cor. 11.5). Prophesying is generally accepted as speaking (or acting) under the inspiration of the Holy Spirit. So that here we have full warrant for women to preach, testify and pray as moved by the Spirit. [...] Those who take part in religious worship with uncovered heads may do so innocently, but by doing so they undermine the very foundation on which they stand when they testify. [...] There should be no disposition to invalidate or evade these instructions or the proper relations therein taught. In fact the covering on the head is intended to be a constant reminder and acknowledgment of this relation. While in Christ the woman is always in a relation of absolute equality with the man, and in official positions in the church and in spiritual things may be the superior of her husband, yet in the family she is in a measure at least subject to her husband. Therefore, while she asserts her spiritual equality in praying or prophesying, by wearing a covering on her head, she acknowledges her proper position in the family relation. There are two reasons especially why women should have some kind of covering on their heads when taking part in religious services. One of them is the fact that they appear to many persons immodest when they are bareheaded. [...] No reputable woman would willingly appear alone on the streets or in any public place with bare head. [...] The principal reason, however, of this position is that the word of God commands it. That should settle all controversy. [...] Let something be worn on the head so that, while our sisters shall maintain that equality in the spirit and in their public ministrations that is given them by God's word, they may at the same time acknowledge that measure of subjection to man which nature and the word of God so plainly teach.

Peter Cartwright, a Methodist revivalist, emphasized the importance of outward holiness in the history of Methodism, stating:

The Methodists in that early day dressed plain; attended their meetings faithfully, especially preaching, prayer and class meetings; they wore no jewelry, no ruffles; they would frequently walk three or four miles to class-meetings and home again, on Sundays; they would go thirty or forty miles to their quarterly meetings, and think it a glorious privilege to meet their presiding elder, and the rest of the preachers. They could, nearly every soul of them, sing our hymns and spiritual songs. They religiously kept the Sabbath day: many of them abstained from dram-drinking, not because the temperance reformation was ever heard of in that day, but because it was interdicted in the General Rules of our Discipline. The Methodists of that day stood up and faced their preacher when they sung; they kneeled down in the public congregation as well as elsewhere, when the preacher said, "Let us pray." There was no standing among the members in time of prayer, especially the abominable practice of sitting down during that exercise was unknown among early Methodists. Parents did not allow their children to go to balls or plays; they did not send them to dancing schools; they generally fasted once a week, and almost universally on Friday before each quarterly meeting. If the Methodists had dressed in the same "superfluity of naughtiness" then as they do now, there were very few even out of the Church that would have had any confidence in their religion. But O, how have things changed for the worse in this educational age of the world!

While few wear plain dress in mainline Methodism today, some Methodist Churches of the conservative holiness movement, such as the Allegheny Wesleyan Methodist Connection and Evangelical Wesleyan Church, continue to dress modestly and plainly, also avoiding the wearing of jewelry (sometimes inclusive of wedding rings). The Fellowship of Independent Methodist Churches continues the practice of headcovering. The 2015 Discipline of the Evangelical Wesleyan Church details these holiness standards in its General Rules:

Members shall conform to the scriptural standards of attire, adorning themselves in a meek and quiet spirit, not with gold, pearls, or costly array. This applies specifically to the wearing of finger rings of any kind (including wedding rings), all forms of symbolic or ornamental jewelry, and any apparel which does not modestly or properly clothe the person. Women shall refrain from cutting their hair or curling it either by commercial processes or by home permanent methods, wearing apparel pertaining to men, or painting their faces or fingernails.

In its Special Rules and Advices, the Evangelical Wesleyan Church further teaches that:

We require our women to appear in public with dresses of modest length, sleeves of modest length, modest necklines and modest hose; the wearing of split skirts, slacks, jeans, artificial flowers or feathers is forbidden. Moreover, we require our men to conform to the scriptural standards of decent and modest attire; we require that when they appear in public they wear shirts with sleeves of modest length. We require that all our people appear in public with sleeves below the elbows. Women's hemlines are to be modestly below the knees. Our people are forbidden to appear in public with transparent or immodest apparel, including shorts or bathing suits. Parents are required to dress their children modestly in conformity with our general principles of Christian attire. We further prohibit our people from participating in the practices of body-piercing, tattooing or body art.

The same denomination, in its 2018 Handbook for the Evangelical Wesleyan Bible Institute (EWBI), teaches the following "Principles of Christian Living" for its seminary students:

Hence it is required that those who profess to be disciples of Christ should come out from the world and be separate, and touch not the unclean thing, abstaining from worldly indulgences, such as the use of tobacco, alcoholic beverages, or harmful drugs or agents, worldly amusements, including theatre-going and television-viewing, video-viewing, inappropriate computer usages, card playing, gambling, dancing, the skating rink, amusements fairs, mixed bathing, listening to "rock" and other types of worldly, un-Christian music; the adoring of worldly dress, such as jewelry, attire which does not modestly and/or properly clothe the person or which pertains to the opposite sex, or women cutting or curling their hair or men letting their hair grow too long; tattooing or body piercing; the profanation of the Lord's Day into a day of secular work, business and/or pleasure; and from all other sinful practices.

The Book of Discipline of the Calvary Holiness Church specifies the standard for the headcovering worn by Christian women:

- a. The Calvary Holiness Church practices the ordinance of the Prayer and Prophesy Veil for women. It is scripturally taught in I Corinthians 11:1-16.
- b. The Veiling is to be worn by the sisters while praying and prophesying.
- (1) We understand praying is a means of communication with God by the individual whether it be public, private or being in a spirit of prayer which is "praying without ceasing."
- (2) We understand prophesying to mean not only preaching but witnessing or testifying whether in a public scene or in a more private surrounding.
- (3) Therefore, the sisters are enjoined to wear their veilings during all waking hours.
- c. The minimum weight of the veiling shall be that of white stiff nylon. It shall be made in the fashion of a bonnet and shall closely fit the hair which has been fashioned into the form of a bun at the crown of the head.

The Methodist doctrine of outward holiness applies to Home Furnishing as well, with the Metropolitan Church Association teaching:

Modesty and economy should be observed in the furnishing of the home. Costly furniture or needless home equipment should not be provided. The world is in great need of all the help the church can possibly give; and it becomes those who are walking in the footsteps of Jesus, to economize on all lines, that they may help the needy.

== Standards ==
Holiness Methodist doctrine teaches that biblical standards of dress and behaviour are followed "an act of obedience and they keep one from nullifying his testimony of grace", being required for all Christians after the first work of grace—regeneration.

The father of Methodism John Wesley's view of biblical standards was further grounded in the principle of stewardship—dressing plainly so that money could go to help the needy: "Everything about thee which cost more than Christian duty required thee to lay out is the blood of the poor!" Methodist evangelist Phoebe Palmer wrote the following prayer of consecration for those seeking to be entirely sanctified, which "involves a submitting to any behavioral standards which might be enjoined upon the believer by God":

With comminglings of intense yet solemn joy, and holy fear, I do at this eventful hour resolve, in the strength of the Lord Jehovah, on minute circumspection in the sustainment and adornment of my body, to indulge in only such things as may be enjoyed in the name of the Lord, and bear the inscription, "HOLINESS UNTO THE LORD".

Daniel Stafford, a Nazarene evangelist, preached that those not adhering to biblical standards of dress and behaviour are not even candidates for the second work of grace: "It would be an insult to the blessed Holy Ghost to ask Him to house a body that is decked out with the things of the world". The 2012 Book of Discipline of the African Methodist Episcopal Zion Church teaches the following standards that are typical of traditional Methodist practice:

¶77. Conditions of Membership—There is only one condition previously required of those who desire admission into these Societies: "A desire to flee from the wrath to come, and to be saved from their sins." But wherever this is really fixed in the soul it will be shown by its fruits. ¶78. It is therefore expected of all who desire to continue therein, that they shall continue to evidence their desire of salvation, first: by doing no harm, by avoiding evil of every kind, especially that which is most generally practiced, such as: The taking of the Name of God in vain, profaning the day of the Lord, either by doing ordinary work therein, or by buying or selling. Drunkenness, buying or selling or using spirituous liquors, unless cases of extreme necessity; fighting, quarreling, brawling; brother going to law with brother; returning evil for evil, or railing for railing; the using of many words in buying and selling; the buying or selling of goods that have not paid the duty; giving or taking things on usury (that is, unlawful interest); uncharitable or unprofitable conversation particularly speaking evil of ministers and magistrates; doing unto others what we would not they should do unto us; doing what we know that is not for the glory of God; the putting on the gold as a useless ornament; and taking such diversion as cannot be done in the name of the Lord Jesus—such as dancing, card-playing, lottery, policy, and other, games of chance; going to circuses and theaters; the singing of those songs and the reading of those books that do not tend to the knowledge and love of God; softness and needless of self-indulgence; laying up treasures on earth; buying goods without the probability of paying for them. ¶79. It is expected of all those who wish to continue in these Societies, that they should continue to evidence their desire of salvation. Secondly: By doing good; by being in every kind merciful after their power; doing good of every possible sort, and, as far as possible, to all men. To their bodies, of the ability which God gives; by giving food to the hungry; by clothing the naked; by visiting or helping them that are sick or in prison; To their souls, by instructing, reproving, or exhorting all whom they have any intercourse with; trampling under foot that enthusiastic doctrine that "We are not to do good unless our hearts be free to it." By doing good especially to them that are of the household of faith, or groaning so to be; employing them preferably to others; buying one of another; helping one another in business and so much the more because the world will love its own, and them only. By all possible diligence and frugality, that the Gospel be not blamed. By running with patience the race set before them, denying themselves and taking up their cross daily; submitting to bear the reproach of Christ; to be as the filth and off scouring of the world; and looking, that men should say all manner of evil against them falsely, for the Lord's sake. It is expected of all who desire in these Societies that they should continue to evidence their desire of salvation. Thirdly: By attending on all the ordinances of God; such as, the Public worship of God; the Ministry of the Word, either read or explained; the Lord's Supper, searching the Scriptures, fasting, and abstinence; family and private prayer. —The Doctrine and Discipline of the African Methodist Episcopal Zion Church

Many of the following standards are those practiced by those who adhere to the doctrine of outward holiness, though certain connexions have relaxed them, especially those in the mainline tradition:

- Modest and plain dress (1 Tim. 2:9), which is defined as loose covering from the neck to below the knee in all normal body postures (Exod. 20:26; 28:42-43) with women's styles including cape dresses and prairie dresses for example; women often wear a Christian headcovering (1 Corinthians 11:2–10). This would include the wearing of swimming dresses by women rather than revealing bathing suits, as well as the strict prohibition of mixed bathing.
- Moderate or no use of jewelry or ornaments of gold, silver, and jewels for personal adornment (1 Tim. 2:9-10; 1 Pet. 3:1-6); some denominations will only allow the use of a wedding band or ring while others proscribe it too.
- A distinction of the sexes in clothing, forbidding such style as trousers and pant suits for women even if required by work or public service. (Deut. 22:5).
- Christian men are to wear their hair short and Christian women must never cut or remove their hair, wearing it long in order to have a definitive distinction of male and female sexes. (1 Cor. 11:14-15).

Outward Holiness can also include the following which reveal an inward character:

- Impeccable honesty (Prov. 11:1; Rom. 12:7)
- Civil obedience (Rom. 13:1-7)
- Subjection to parental authority (Eph. 6:1)
- Submission to the spiritual authority (Heb. 13:17)
- No profanity or vulgar joking or explicit conversation (Eph. 4:29; 5:4; Col. 3:8)
- Keeping the Ten Commandments, such as observing the Christian Sabbath (John 14:15; 1 John 2:3-4; Heb. 10:25)
- Regular prayer and fasting (Acts 14:21-23)
- Abstinence from alcohol and other drugs (Prov. 20:1; Rom. 13:13; Eph. 5:18; 1 Thes. 5:7-8)
- Avoidance of social dances (Rom. 13:11-14; Gal. 5:19-21)

== Observing denominations ==
Outward Holiness is a part of Wesleyan-Arminian (Methodist) theology and practice, being inherited in many Holiness Pentecostal traditions. Methodism, along with other traditions aligned with the holiness movement, in addition to Holiness Pentecostalism, teach the doctrine of Holiness (also known as entire sanctification). While Finished Work Pentecostalism (and its derivative Oneness Pentecostalism) rejected the doctrine of entire sanctification, certain Finished Work Pentecostal and Oneness Pentecostal denominations have preserved the doctrine of outward holiness. Denominations that observe Outward Holiness are:

=== Methodist (inclusive of the holiness movement) ===
- Allegheny Wesleyan Methodist Connection
- Bible Methodist Connection of Churches
- Bible Holiness Church
- Bible Missionary Church
- Emmanuel Association of Churches
- Evangelical Wesleyan Church
- Fellowship of Independent Methodist Churches
- God's Missionary Church
- Wesleyan Holiness Alliance
- Wesleyan Holiness Association of Churches

=== Holiness Pentecostal ===
- Apostolic Faith Church
- Fire-Baptized Holiness Church
- Free Gospel Church
- Free Holiness Church (Arkansas)

=== Finished Work Pentecostal ===
- New Testament Christian Churches of America (few)

=== Oneness Pentecostal ===
- Apostolic Assembly of the Faith in Christ Jesus
- Assemblies of the Lord Jesus Christ
- Church of Our Lord Jesus Christ of the Apostolic Faith
- Church of the Lord Jesus Christ
- Gospel Assembly Churches
- Pentecostal Assemblies of the World
- United Pentecostal Church International

=== Restorationism ===
- Church of God (Anderson, Indiana) (few)
- Church of God (Holiness)
- Church of God (Guthrie, Oklahoma)
- Church of God (Restoration)

Conservative Anabaptist and Old Order Anabaptist communities from the Amish, Apostolic Christian, Bruderhof, Charity Christian, Hutterite, Mennonite, Schwarzenau Brethren and River Brethren traditions are considered plain people for their simple lifestyle and plain dress, which includes Christian headcoverings for women. Likewise, Quakers of the Conservative Friends and Holiness Friends traditions practice a testimony of simplicity. As these churches have a different origin from those of the Wesleyan-Arminian tradition, they do not call this outward holiness although their beliefs often produce the same externals as those of the Wesleyan-Arminian tradition, e.g. plain dress; the Calvary Holiness Church, a River Brethren denomination that was influenced by the holiness movement, is an exception given its dual theological roots. Other people with a similar lifestyle include communicants of the Laestadian Lutheran churches and some Reformed denominations, such as the Free Presbyterian Church of Scotland and the Netherlands Reformed Congregations. Congregants in Independent Baptist churches, as well as those of the Plymouth Brethren, are also known for their modest dress. Some Traditionalist Catholics, such as the communicants of the Congregation of Mary Immaculate Queen and the Palmarian Catholic Church, follow principles of modesty known as "Marylike standards" (this too produces modesty externals similar to those in the Wesleyan-Arminian tradition).

== See also ==
- Works of Piety
- Works of Mercy
- Growth in grace
- Nonconformity to the world
- Plain people
