= Reformed Free Methodist Church =

Methodist church

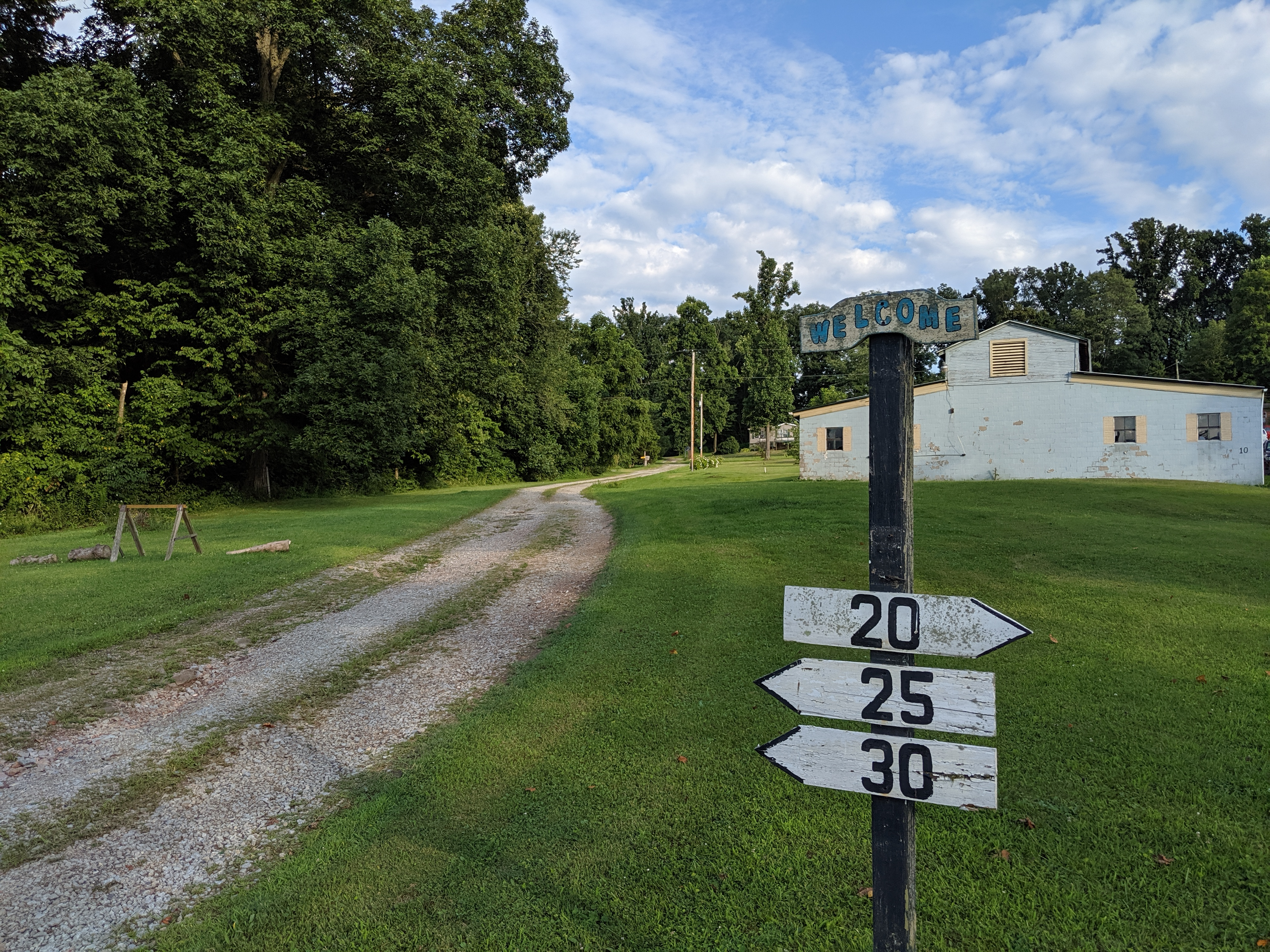
- Tabernacle of Flatwoods Reformed Free Methodist Campground, which served as the location of the Reformed Free Methodist Church's annual camp meeting in Perryopolis, Pennsylvania
- Classification: Methodism
- Orientation: Conservative holiness movement
- Polity: Connexionalism
- Associations: Interchurch Holiness Convention
- Origin: 1932
- Separated from: Free Methodist Church (1932)

The Reformed Free Methodist Church (RFMC) was a Wesleyan Methodist denomination in the conservative holiness movement.

== History ==
The formation of the Reformed Free Methodist Church is a part of the history of Methodism in the United States; it was founded in 1932 as a result of a schism with the Free Methodist Church spearheaded by Samuel E. West. The Reformed Free Methodist Church was one of the first denominations in the conservative holiness movement.

After its formation, some members of the Reformed Free Methodist Church attended the Interchurch Holiness Convention.

== Name ==
The name of the denomination derives from the Church it left, the Free Methodist Church, as well as the word "Reformed", which does not refer to the theology of the denomination, but invokes the meaning of the word in plain English, "refined" or "improved". The Reformed Free Methodist Church upheld traditional Wesleyan-Arminian theology.

== Traditions ==
Communicants of the Reformed Free Methodist Church sung hymns in corporate worship a cappella and wore plain dress (with black and white clothing preferred at the liturgy), in keeping with historic Holiness Methodist standards. The denomination published The Reformed Free Methodist Standard.

== Camp Meetings ==
The earlier camp meetings of the Reformed Free Methodist Church were held at McClain's Grove in Belle Vernon, Pennsylvania. The Reformed Free Methodist Church then held its annual camp meeting, the Flatwoods Camp Meeting, at Perryopolis, Pennsylvania after acquiring property there. It was free of cost, running only off of the free-will offerings of those who attended it.

== Churches ==
The Reformed Free Methodist Church had congregations throughout North America, with notable churches existing in Buffalo, Perryopolis, Fairmont, Morgantown and Havelock, among many others. The church building of the Reformed Free Methodist Church in Alliance, Ohio was the oldest one in that city until it was demolished on 25 January 2019; the congregation, ministered by the Rev. Herbert Smith, is now located at the Home Mission in Alliance. The Reformed Free Methodist Church of Morgantown, West Virginia, with a membership of around two hundred people, was unique in that its architecture resembled a tabernacle.

== See also ==
- Evangelical Wesleyan Church
- Fellowship of Independent Methodist Churches
