= House of Prayer (denomination) =

Protestant Christian denomination

- Classification: Protestant
- Orientation: Conservative Holiness movement
- Theology: Wesleyan-Arminian theology
- Polity: Congregational-Connectional
- Region: Ohio
- Origin: 1919
- Separated from: Churches of Christ in Christian Union (partially)
- Congregations: 2
- Members: Approx. 200 (1999)

House of Prayer is a Christian denomination aligned with the conservative holiness movement. It has roots in the Wesleyan-Holiness movement, Christian communalism, and restorationism.

== Background ==
House of Prayer founder Edward Wayne Runyan (1864–1945) followed the example of the "Holy Jumpers" of the Metropolitan Church Association, a Holiness Methodist denomination that taught that Christians should live communally in accordance with the teachings in Acts 2:44–47, the teaching referred to as "All Things Common".

In 1917, several converts were made among the Churches of Christ in Christian Union (CCCU), including one of the denomination's founders, Henry C. Leeth (died 1967). Leeth started a Christian commune with Runyan. The commune consisted of a farm and a store near Urbana, Ohio.

The CCCU expelled Leeth and 13 other ministers in 1918 for holding to Runyan's teachings. At first inclined to participate in Runyan's plan for a fully integrated church community, once the leadership became fully aware of the implications of the teaching—the scrapping of tithing, along with the complete community pooling of all members' income—the annual council of the CCCU speedily resolved that those promoting the "All Things Common" movement have their recognition as CCCU ministers revoked. Leeth became the House of Prayer's first bishop (or elder) in 1919. The movement and churches went by many names over the years in addition to House of Prayer (HP for short): All Things Common, God's Non-Sectarian Tabernacle, and simply "The Church."

Though the commune failed, the House of Prayer set up many churches and an annual camp meeting which at its peak attracted a thousand visitors per year. It published the periodicals the Herald of Perfect Christianity and Repairer of the Breach, of which no copies are extant or locatable. Its headquarters were in Washington Court House, Ohio—where a church still met as of 2014.

In 1999, the denomination reported two churches and around 200 members, as well as the annual camp meeting.

House of Prayer pastors and congregants have attended the Interchurch Holiness Convention (IHC).

== See also ==
- Holiness movement
- Communitarianism
