= Church of God (Guthrie, Oklahoma) =

Christian denomination

Coordinates: 35.8812°N 97.4396°W

- Classification: Protestant
- Orientation: Conservative holiness movement
- Theology: Wesleyan-Arminian
- Separated from: Church of God (Anderson, Indiana) (1910s)

The Church of God (Guthrie, Oklahoma), also known as the Church of God Evening Light, is a Christian denomination in the Wesleyan-Arminian and Restorationist traditions, being aligned with the conservative holiness movement.

== History ==
The origin of the Church of God lies in the Wesleyan-Holiness movement, particularly the teaching of Daniel Sidney Warner that led to the establishment of the Church of God (Anderson). Tenets of the church included the teaching that "all believers are members of the church of God" and the "concept of unity among believers". The Church of God taught nonresistance and held that "interracial worship was a sign of the true Church", with both white and black people ministering regularly in Church of God congregations Those who were entirely sanctified testified that they were "saved, sanctified, and prejudice removed".

George Winn, an ex-slave, founded the Guthrie congregation itself at Guthrie in 1905. Its early work toward racial integration gained it the pejorative title The Church of God (Holstein). The Guthrie congregation and associated congregations are from a group who under the leadership of C.E. Orr dissolved fellowship with Church of God (Anderson) as a result of controversies, chiefly "worldly conformity in dress", that arose regarding liberal versus conservative issues during the years 1910-1917; the Church of God is thus among the original denominations of the conservative holiness movement though it remains generally isolated due to its anti-sectarian position. It is therefore not well represented in the Interchurch Holiness Convention, with only a few Church of God (Guthrie, Oklahoma) adherents in attendance. The Guthrie congregation felt that the larger Church of God (Anderson) was compromising the original teachings of the Evening Light Reformation and chose to remain with what they believed to be the original standards.

In 2003, the Church of God (Guthrie, Oklahoma) had 43 congregations in 18 states in the United States; (the largest concentrations being in Oklahoma and California). The church does not keep membership rolls. Faith and Victory (founded 1923) is a monthly publication of the church. Through mission efforts the church has extended into at least 11 other countries outside of the U.S., including India, Mexico, Nigeria and the Philippines.

== Theology and practices ==
This body teaches that believers should closely follow the teachings of the Bible. They see an example in spiritual leaders of the holiness movement such as Daniel Sidney Warner, among others, that were instrumental in bringing about the "Evening Light Reformation". They believe that God began to restore the church to the standards and light of the early morning church era through Warner and others in 1880.

The doctrines and practices of the church reflect those of the Church of God (Anderson) in its earlier days. In comparison, the church maintains a stronger emphasis on outward, practical holiness and separation from cultural trends of the world than the present Anderson Movement. Entire Sanctification is held as a second work of grace after the New Birth. The Church of God teaches that "Acts of benevolence and charity are foundational to the life of a Christian" and that "True godly love and religious faith are demonstrated through sacrifice in ministering to the needy and less fortunate." In keeping with the standard of holiness, a ministerial statement was issued in 1959 taking a stand against people in leadership positions in the church having televisions in their homes. Those who attend the Church of God practice plain dress and do not wear jewelry, inclusive of wedding rings. Women do not wear makeup or cut their hair; "plaiting or interweaving material or other items into the hair is forbidden". In keeping with the doctrine of outward holiness, men keep their hair cut short and wear pants, while women wear long skirts or dresses. The church teaches that the committing of willful sin, and that alone, disqualifies someone from being a member.

As the Church of God teaches nonresistance, it falls into the subcategory of Holiness Pacifists (along with other denominations such as the Emmanuel Association of Churches). It teaches that marriage is "a lifetime union between one man and one woman" and forbids the remarriage of divorced persons.

Practices of the church include baptism by immersion, the Lord's supper, feet washing, lifting up holy hands, anointing with oil, divine healing, fasting and a cappella singing. With regard to the administration of Holy Communion, the Church of God teaches that "communion of the body and blood of the Lord among believers could not be signified in any other way than by all of them partaking of one loaf and one cup .... A number of small individual glasses and a number of small individual wafers or pieces of bread may be a proper signification of sectism and division, or maybe of individualism, but not of the unity and oneness of believers as they partake of that one bread and one body." The Church of God has a ministry of elders and deacons. Teaching on the end of time is that the second coming of the Lord represents the end of the world and the end of life on the world for all people, both good and evil, without there being a one thousand-year reign on earth or second chance for the wicked to repent. Free-will offering is taught rather than tithing, and the ministry believes in living by faith rather than accepting salaries. Although Guthrie is home to one of the larger congregations in this fellowship, Guthrie is not the headquarters. The church teaches that Christ is the head of the church and that the headquarters is in heaven. An ecclesiastical hierarchy with one man having the preeminence over others is considered man-rule and not the pattern described in the Bible for church leadership. It opposes the Pentecostal practice of glossolalia.

== See also ==
- Church of God (Holiness)
