= Swimming dress =

Modest swimwear for women

A swimming dress, also known as a swim dress, is a modern dress worn by women while swimming, that preserves traditional religious definitions of modesty. Swimming dresses are popular among Christians of the Conservative Anabaptist, Holiness Methodist, and Holiness Quaker traditions, as well as Orthodox Jews and a number of Muslims; many wearers of swimming dresses, such as the Methodists of the conservative holiness movement, believe that modern popular practice of the wearing of trousers by women blurs the distinction between men and women, while others, such as adherent Muslims teach that pants should not be worn by women as they reveal the contour of the legs that should be hidden to maintain modesty. Swimming dresses have sleeves that usually go beyond the elbows as well as hemlines that extend beyond the knees for the purpose of maintaining traditional religious definitions of modesty (see outward holiness). In Israel, they are known as Schwimmkleid. In recent years, the demand for modest clothing has risen, which may be due to the growth of religious traditions such as Apostolic Pentecostalism. This has led to a greater interest in swimming dresses.

== See also ==
- Burqini
- Christian headcovering
- Denim skirt
- Modest fashion
- Quiverfull
