= Evangelical Wesleyan Church =

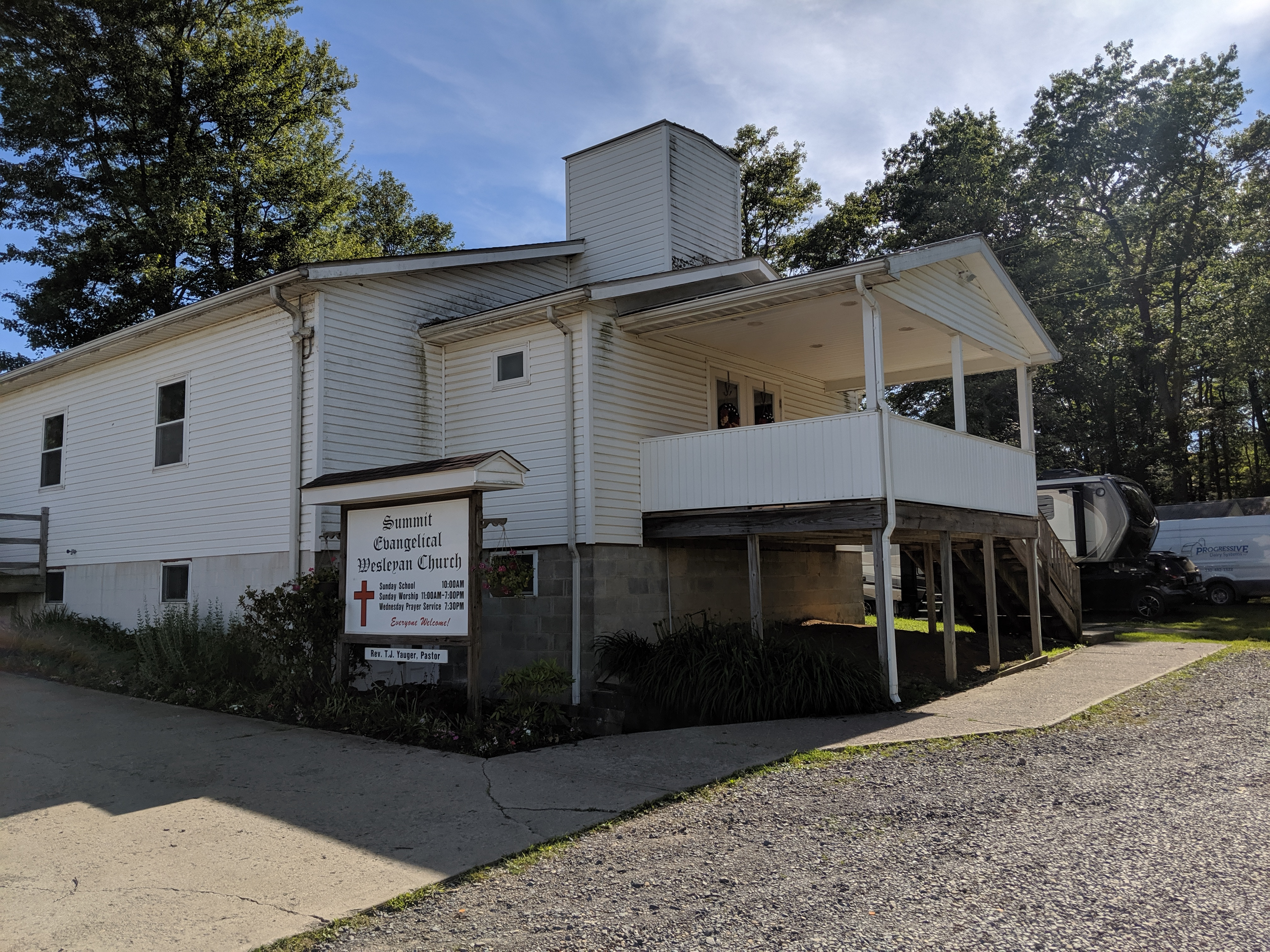
- Summit EWC is a local church belonging to the Evangelical Wesleyan Church
- Classification: Methodism
- Orientation: Holiness movement
- Polity: Connexionalism
- Founder: John Wesley
- Origin: 1963
- Separated from: Free Methodist Church (1963)
- Merger of: Evangelical Wesleyan Church of North America and the Midwest Holiness Association
- Separations: Wesleyan Church (1968)
- Congregations: 27

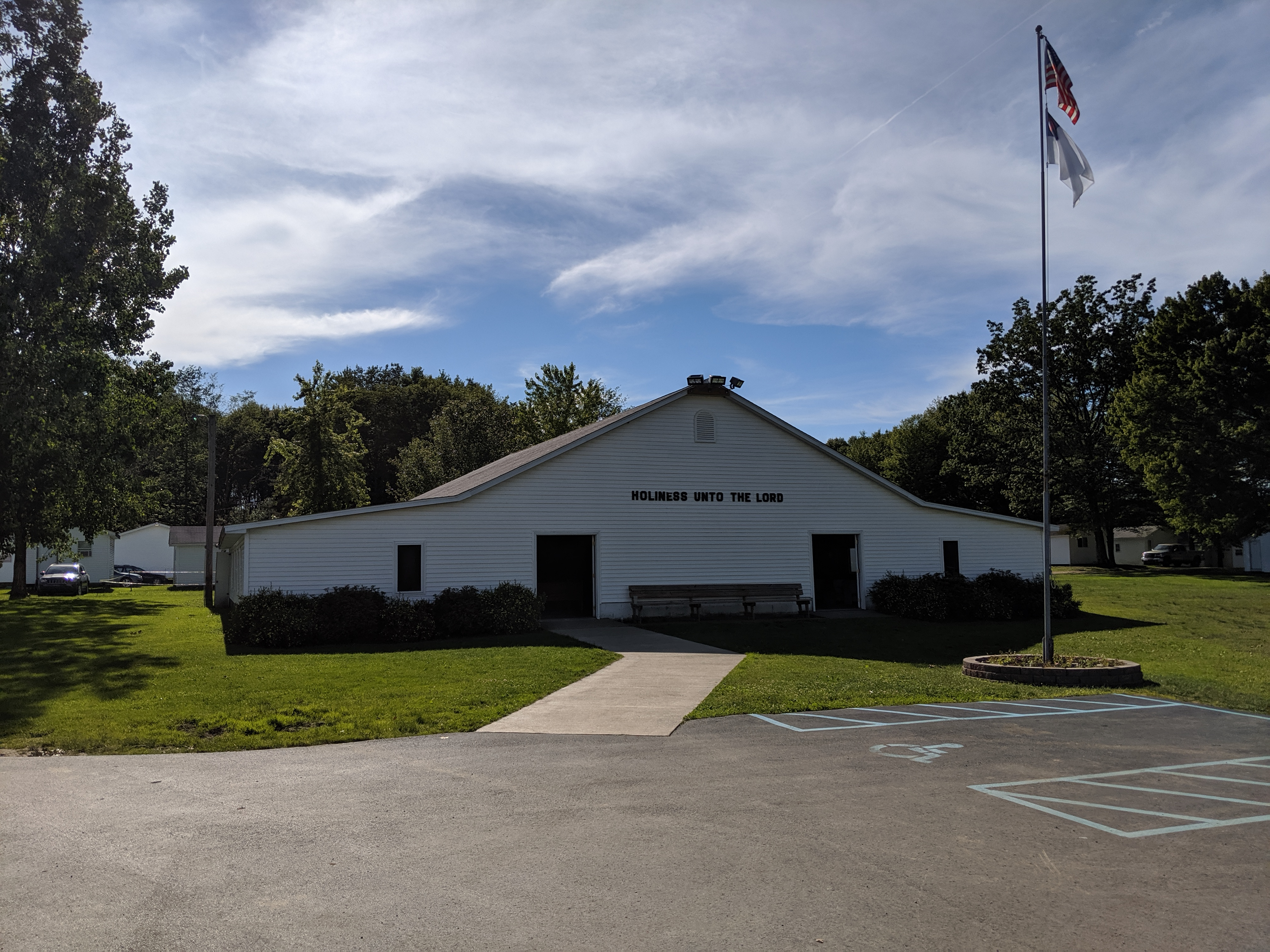
The tabernacle of Summit Campground, where the Evangelical Wesleyan Church holds its Eastern Annual Conference, as well as a camp meeting, each year.

The Evangelical Wesleyan Church, formerly known as the Evangelical Wesleyan Church of North America, is a Methodist denomination in the conservative holiness movement.

The formation of the Evangelical Wesleyan Church is a part of the history of Methodism in the United States; its creation was the result of a schism with the Free Methodist Church in 1963. In 1969, it merged with the Midwest Holiness Association, which had also left the Free Methodist Church.

The Evangelical Wesleyan Church was founded with a commitment to uphold the doctrine and standards of traditional Methodism. It has twenty-seven congregations.

The Church publishes a periodical known as The Earnest Christian and its seminary is the Evangelical Wesleyan Bible Institute (EWBI) in Cooperstown, Pennsylvania. The denomination additionally operated the John Fletcher Christian College, though this closed in 1995. Much of the denomination's literature is printed by LWD Publishing.

It holds a denomination-wide camp meeting at Summit Campground in Cooperstown, Pennsylvania and the Western Annual Conference meets at Camp Nysted in Nysted, Nebraska. An annual camp meeting also occurs at Fox Hill Campground in Northville, Fulton County, New York.

== See also ==
- Fellowship of Independent Methodist Churches
- Reformed Free Methodist Church
