= Wesleyan Holiness Church =

Methodist denomination

- Classification: Methodism
- Orientation: Conservative holiness movement
- Polity: Connexionalism
- Associations: Interchurch Holiness Convention
- Separated from: Bible Missionary Church
- Congregations: 24

The Wesleyan Holiness Church, also known as the Wesleyan Holiness Association of Churches, is a Methodist Christian denomination in the conservative holiness movement. It has congregations throughout Canada, the United States and missions in other parts of the world.

== History ==
The formation of the Wesleyan Holiness Church is a part of the history of Methodism in the United States and Canada; it sits within the Holiness movement which emerged in Methodism during the nineteenth century. The church is a schism from the Bible Missionary Church that happened in 1959, the result of perceived overly-lenient views on divorce and remarriage within that group. Congregations that belong to the Wesleyan Holiness Association of Churches joined it, such as that in Portage, which held its first service of worship was held on 18 March 1956.

== General Conference, Annual conferences and Camp meetings ==
The Wesleyan Holiness Association of Churches holds a General Conference.

The Central District of Wesleyan Holiness Association of Churches holds its annual conference and camp meeting at the Orleans Wesleyan Campgrounds in Orleans, Indiana.

The Northeast District of Wesleyan Holiness Association of Churches holds its annual conference and camp meeting at the Clinton Holiness Campgrounds in Clinton, Pennsylvania.

== Publications ==
The official organ of the Wesleyan Association of Churches is the Eleventh Hour Messenger.
