= Allegheny Wesleyan Methodist Connection =

Methodist denomination within the conservative holiness movement

Allegheny Wesleyan Methodist Connection Allegheny Wesleyan Methodist Connection (Original Allegheny Conference)
- Classification: Methodism
- Orientation: Conservative Holiness Movement
- Polity: Connexionalism
- President: David Blowers
- Vice President: Dan Cope
- Founder: John Wesley
- Origin: 1968
- Separated from: Wesleyan Methodist Church (1968)
- Congregations: 108
- Secondary schools: 16
- Tertiary institutions: 2
- Official website: awmc.org

The Allegheny Wesleyan Methodist Connection (AWMC) is a Methodist denomination within the conservative holiness movement. It is primarily based in the United States, with missions in Peru, Ghana, and Haiti, among other countries. The Allegheny Wesleyan Methodist Connection is currently led by Rev. David Blowers (President) and Rev. Dan Cope (Vice President).

== History ==
The first official Methodist organization in the United States occurred in Baltimore, Maryland, in 1784, with the formation of the Methodist Episcopal Church at the Christmas Conference with Francis Asbury and Thomas Coke as the leaders.

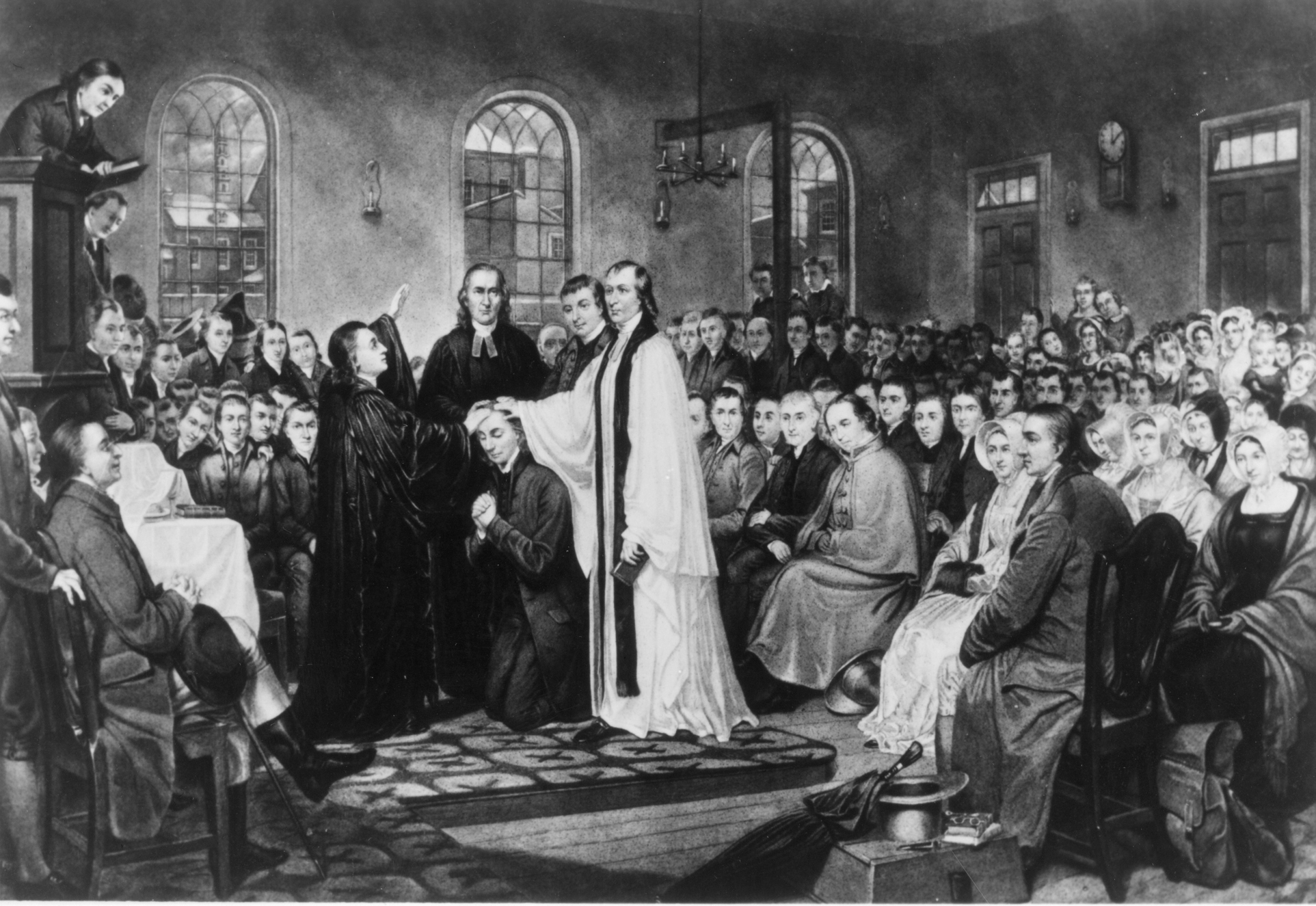
The ordination of Bishop Francis Asbury by Bishop Thomas Coke at the Christmas Conference establishing the Methodist Episcopal Church, 1784.

Though John Wesley originally wanted the Methodists to stay within the Church of England, the American Revolution decisively separated the Methodists in the American colonies from the life and sacraments of the Anglican Church. In 1784, after unsuccessful attempts to have the Church of England send a bishop to start a new Church in the colonies, Wesley decisively appointed fellow priest Thomas Coke as superintendent (bishop) to organize a separate Methodist Society. Together with Coke, Wesley sent The Sunday Service of the Methodists, the first Methodist liturgical text, as well as the Articles of Religion, which were received and adopted by the Baltimore Christmas Conference of 1784, officially establishing the Methodist Episcopal Church. The conference was held at the Lovely Lane Methodist Church, considered the Mother Church of American Methodism.

The new Church grew rapidly in the young country as it employed circuit riders, many of whom were laymen, to travel the mostly rural nation by horseback to preach the Gospel and to establish churches until there was scarcely any village in the United States without a Methodist presence. With 4,000 circuit riders by 1844, the Methodist Episcopal Church rapidly became the largest Protestant denomination in the country.

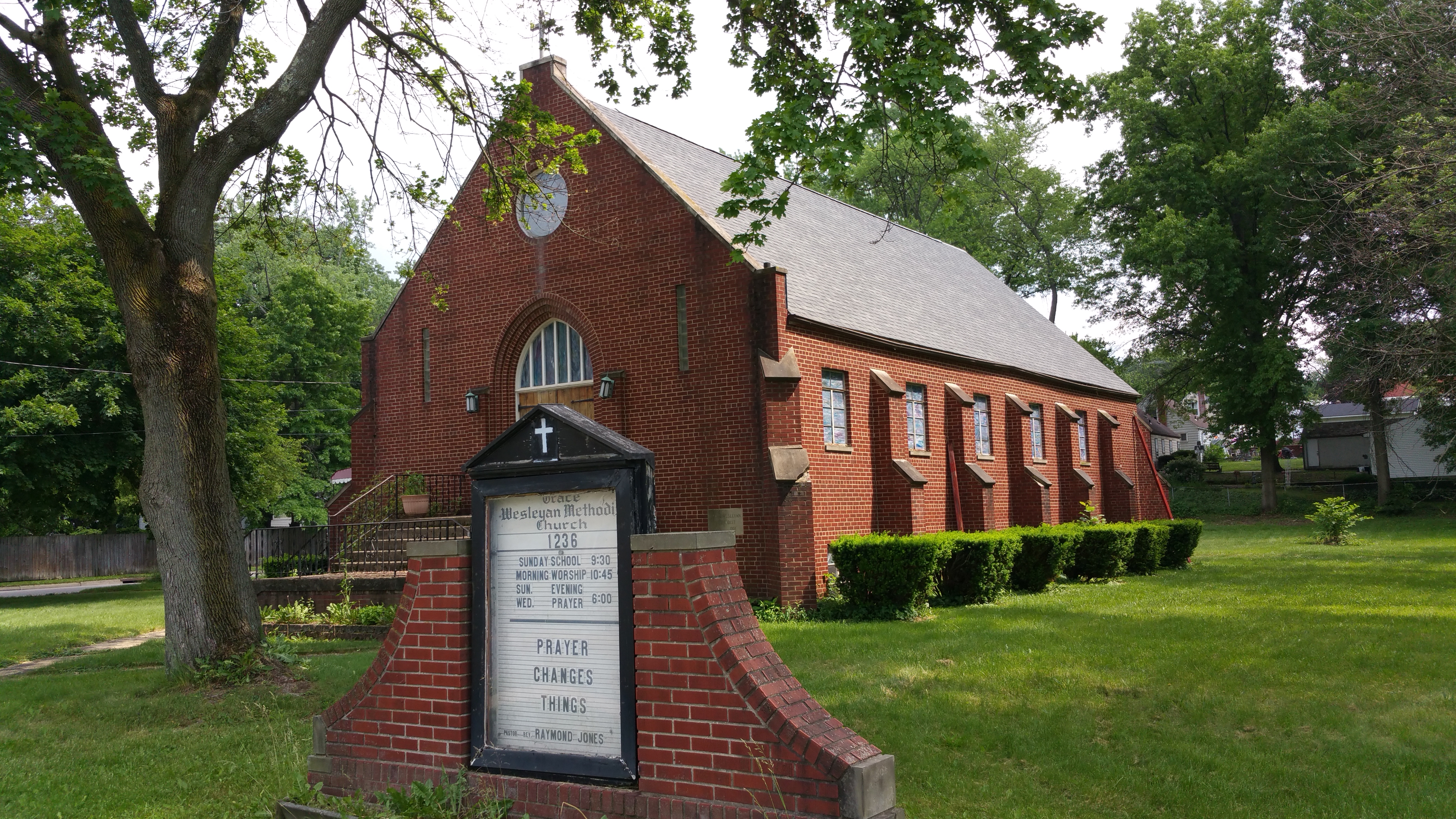
Grace Wesleyan Methodist Church in Akron, Ohio

The Allegheny Wesleyan Methodist Connection specifically traces its origin to the Wesleyan Methodist Church which was a Methodist denomination in the United States organized on May 13, 1841. The congregations that withdrew from the Methodist Episcopal Church did so because they strongly advocated abolitionism and disagreed with the church polity held by the M.E. Church. The first secessions in 1841 took place in Michigan although the new church group was formalized in Utica, New York. In November 1842, Orange Scott, La Roy Sunderland and Jotham Horton seceded from the M. E. Church for reasons given in their publication of the True Wesleyan (which was later renamed the Wesleyan Methodist), with opposition to slavery being a key issue. The first General Conference was held in Utica, NY in October, 1844. Later the name was changed to The Wesleyan Methodist Connection of America. The Wesleyan Methodist Church emphasized the preservation and promotion of experimental and practical godliness, stressing the Methodist doctrines of the New Birth and entire sanctification (holiness). It taught the equality of races and sent missionaries to various parts of the globe.

The Allegheny Conference of the Wesleyan Methodist Church entered into a schism with the rest of the Wesleyan Methodist Church because it favored a connexional polity and opposed the merger of the Wesleyan Methodist Church with the Pilgrim Holiness Church; it thus became the Allegheny Wesleyan Methodist Connection while the majority of the Wesleyan Methodist Church merged with the majority of the Pilgrim Holiness Church to become the Wesleyan Church. While it officially operates under the name "Allegheny Wesleyan Methodist Connection (Original Allegheny Conference)" due to an agreement during the merger between the Wesleyan Methodist Church and the Pilgrim Holiness Church in 1968, most of the churches continue to be called Wesleyan Methodist.

== Campgrounds ==
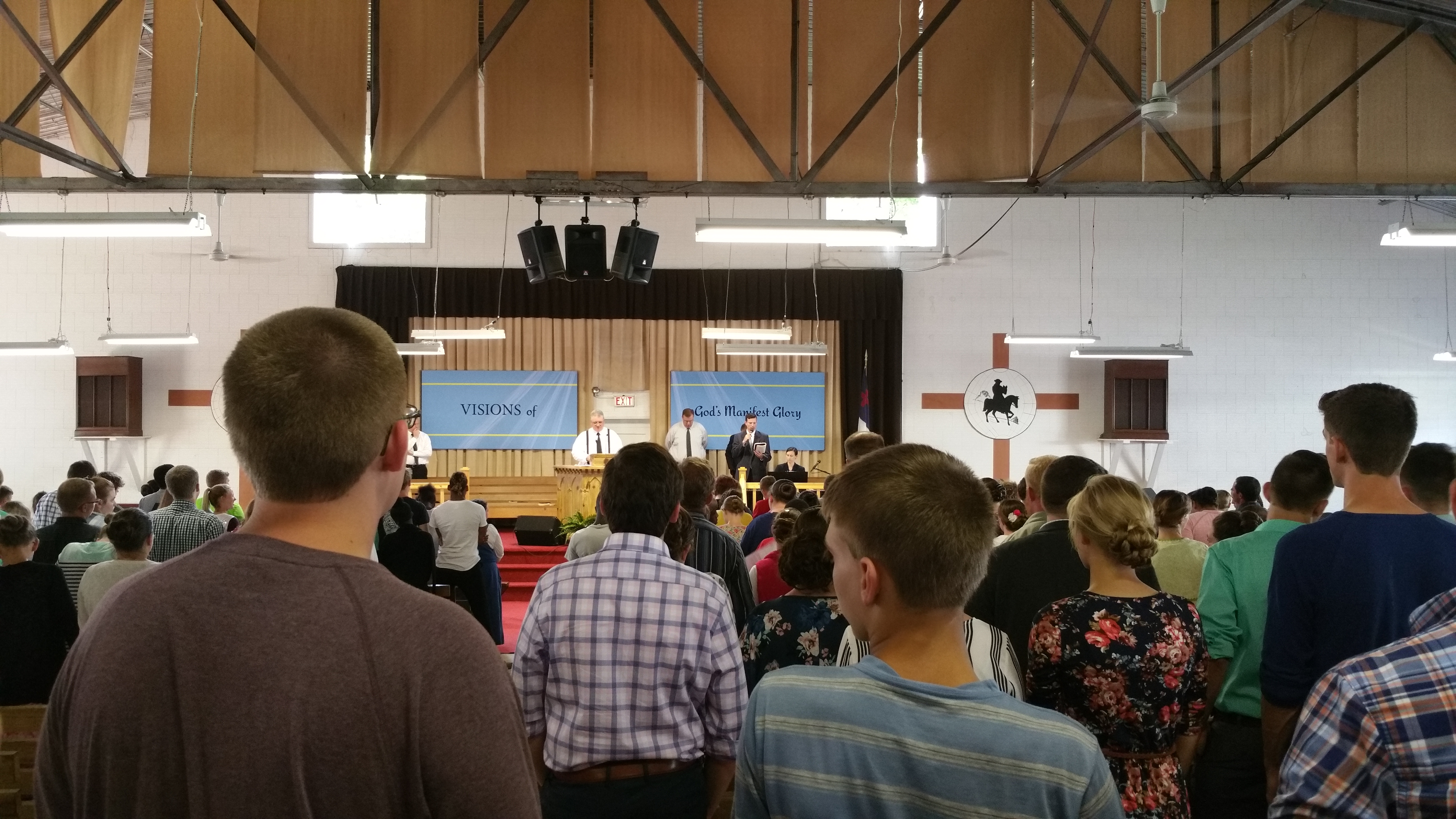
A service of worship at the tabernacle of a camp meeting of the Allegheny Wesleyan Methodist Connection, held at Wesleyan Methodist Camp in Stoneboro, Pennsylvania.

In 1900 the Allegheny Conference of the Wesleyan Methodist Church purchased land in Stoneboro, Pennsylvania to be used for a camp meeting ground; it is known as Methodist Campground. Located next to this campground is the Stoneboro Wesleyan Methodist School which was built in 1965. The denomination continues to hold its annual conference at its campgrounds in the month of June, and its historic annual camp meeting in the month of August. The denomination has other smaller campgrounds that also hold camp meetings throughout its geographic territory, such as those in Belsano, Pennsylvania and Princeton, West Virginia.

== Educational institutions ==
It operates Allegheny Wesleyan College, a four-year Bible college dedicated to preparing Christian ministers, missionaries, and teachers. It is located in Salem, Ohio. Allegheny Wesleyan Methodist Connection also runs Northwest Indian Bible School (NIBS) in Alberton, Montana. In addition, the Allegheny Wesleyan Methodist Connection has sixteen Christian schools in Pennsylvania, Ohio, Montana, and New Mexico.

== Missions ==
The Allegheny Wesleyan Methodist Connection runs 33 missions, with 20 more missions being added since 1968. These are located in Haiti, Ghana, Peru, as well as among Native Americans of the United States and Canada.

== Publications ==
The Allegheny Conference of the Wesleyan Methodist Church publishes a monthly periodical known as The Allegheny Wesleyan Methodist. It also runs a radio program known as Wesleyan Gospel Echoes.

== Gallery ==
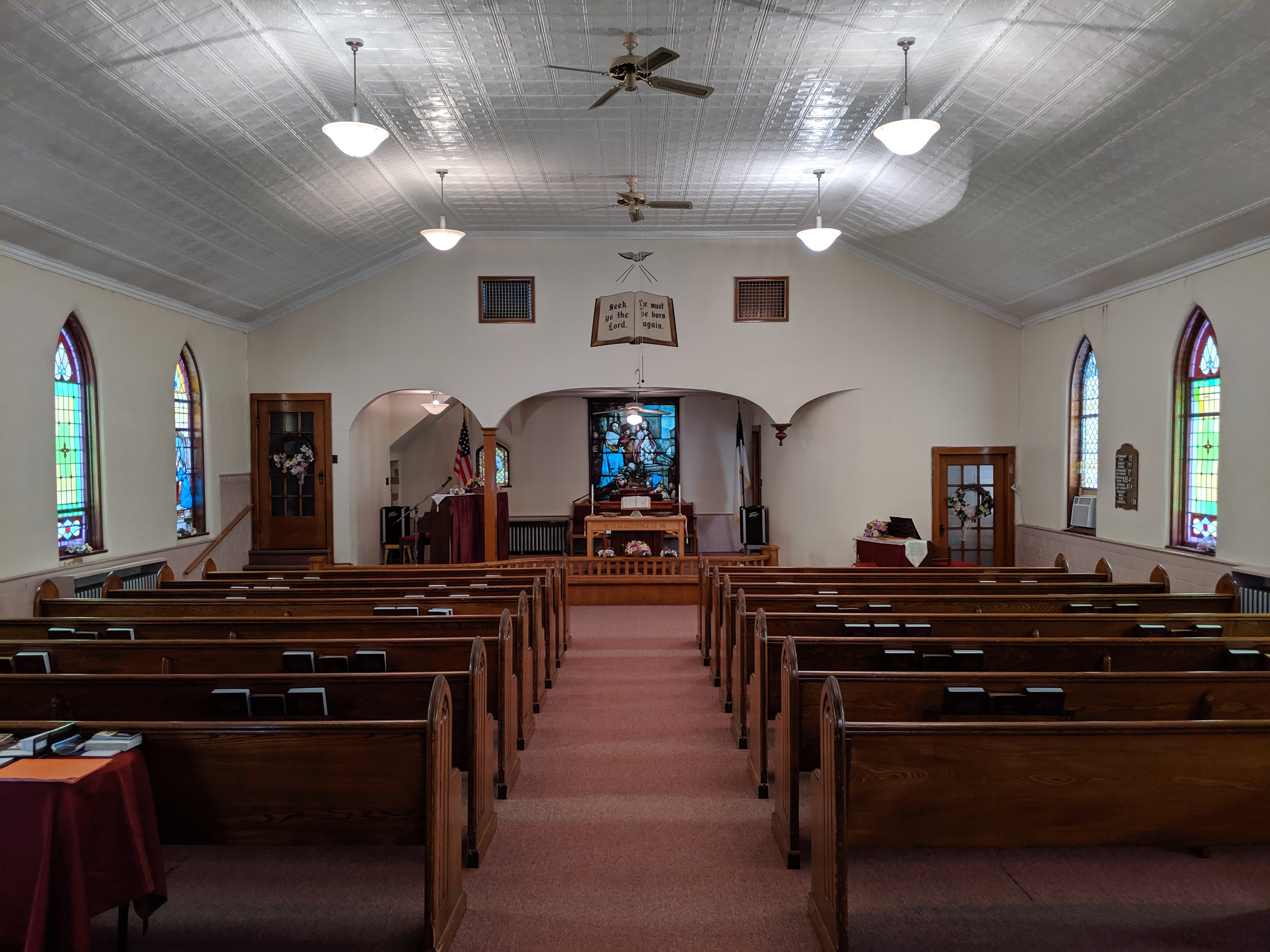
The chancel of White Memorial WMC in Struthers, Ohio

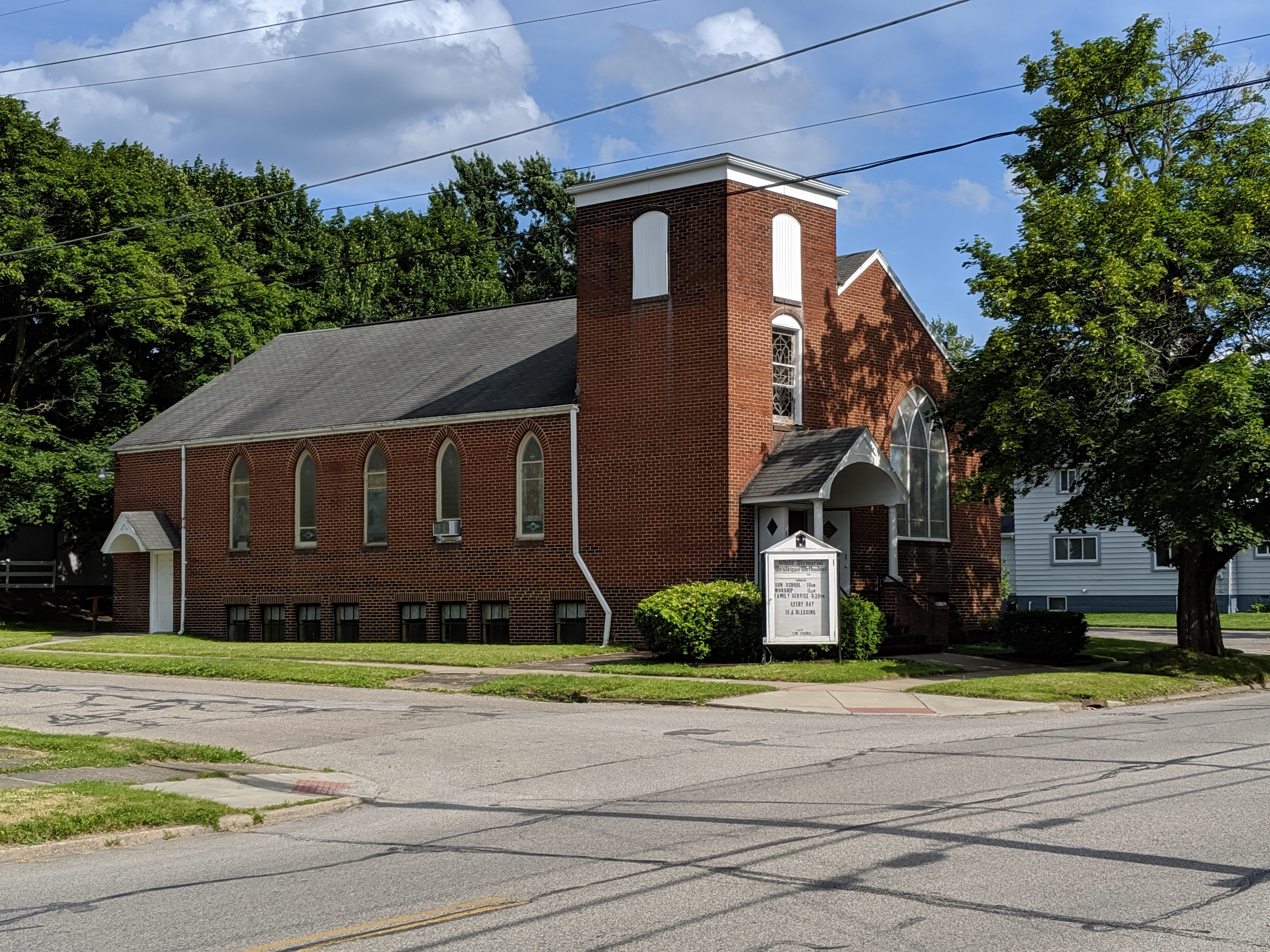
White Memorial Wesleyan Methodist Church in Struthers, Ohio

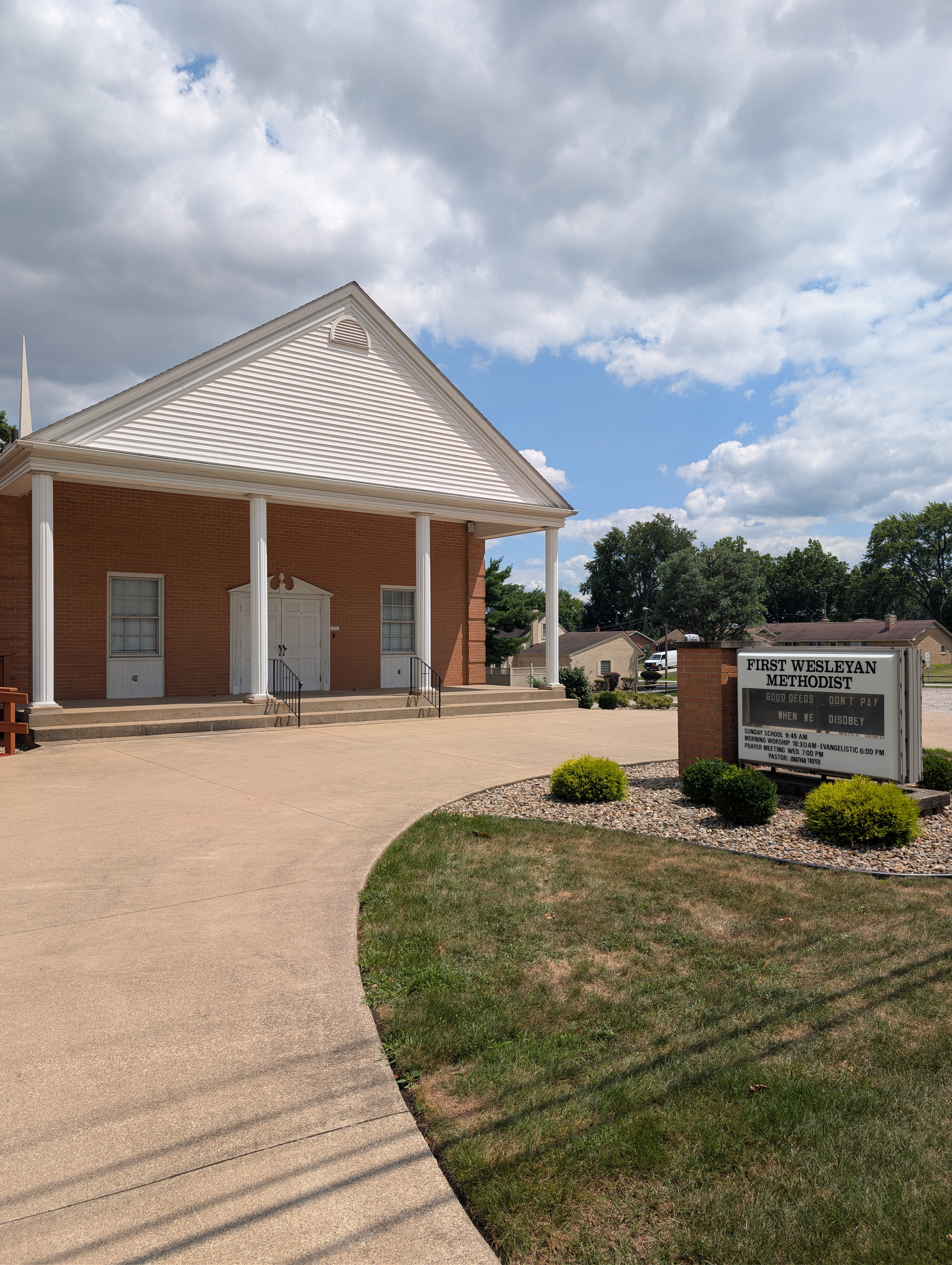
First Wesleyan Methodist Church in Canton, Ohio

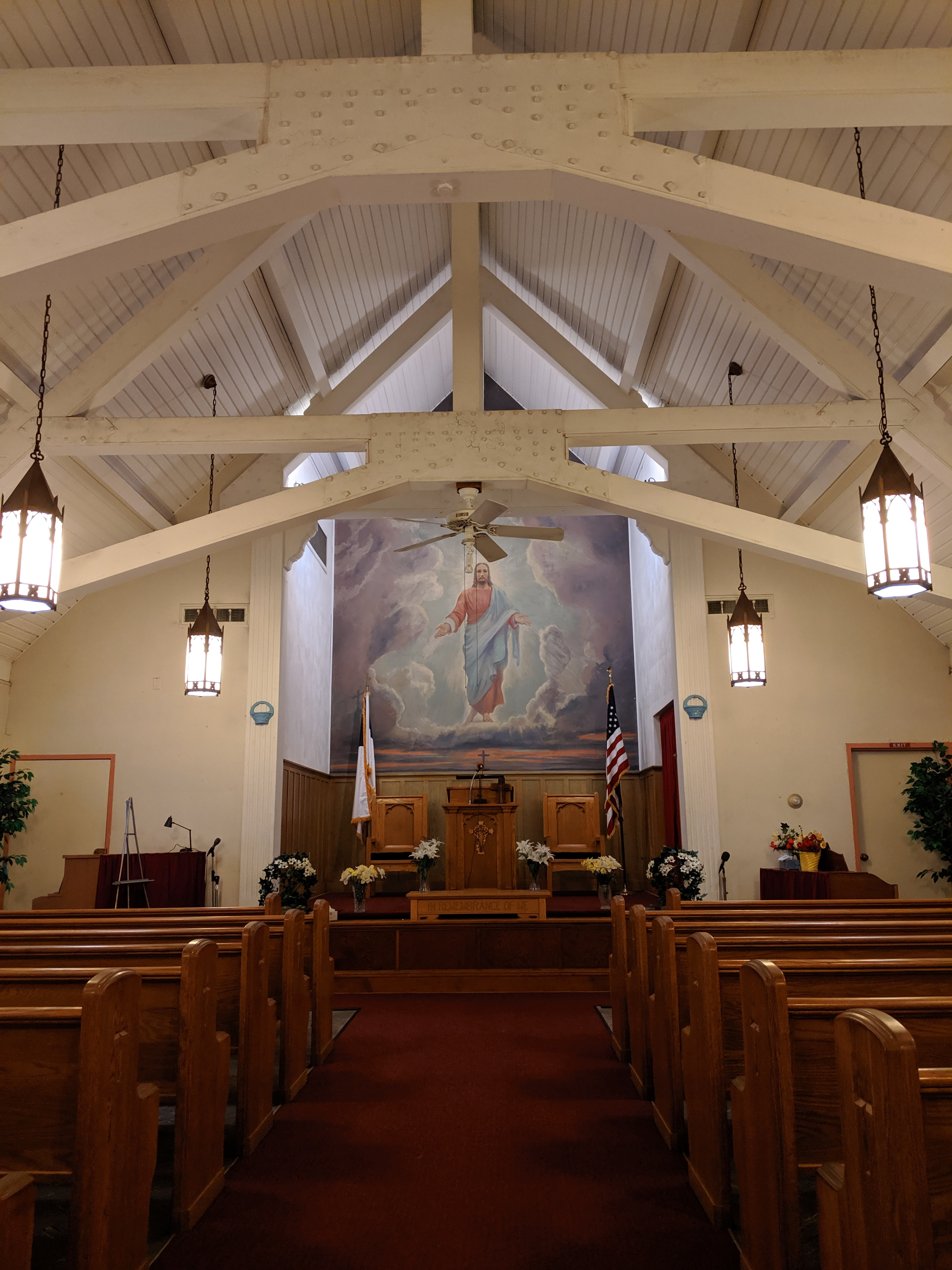
The chancel of Grace WMC in Akron, Ohio

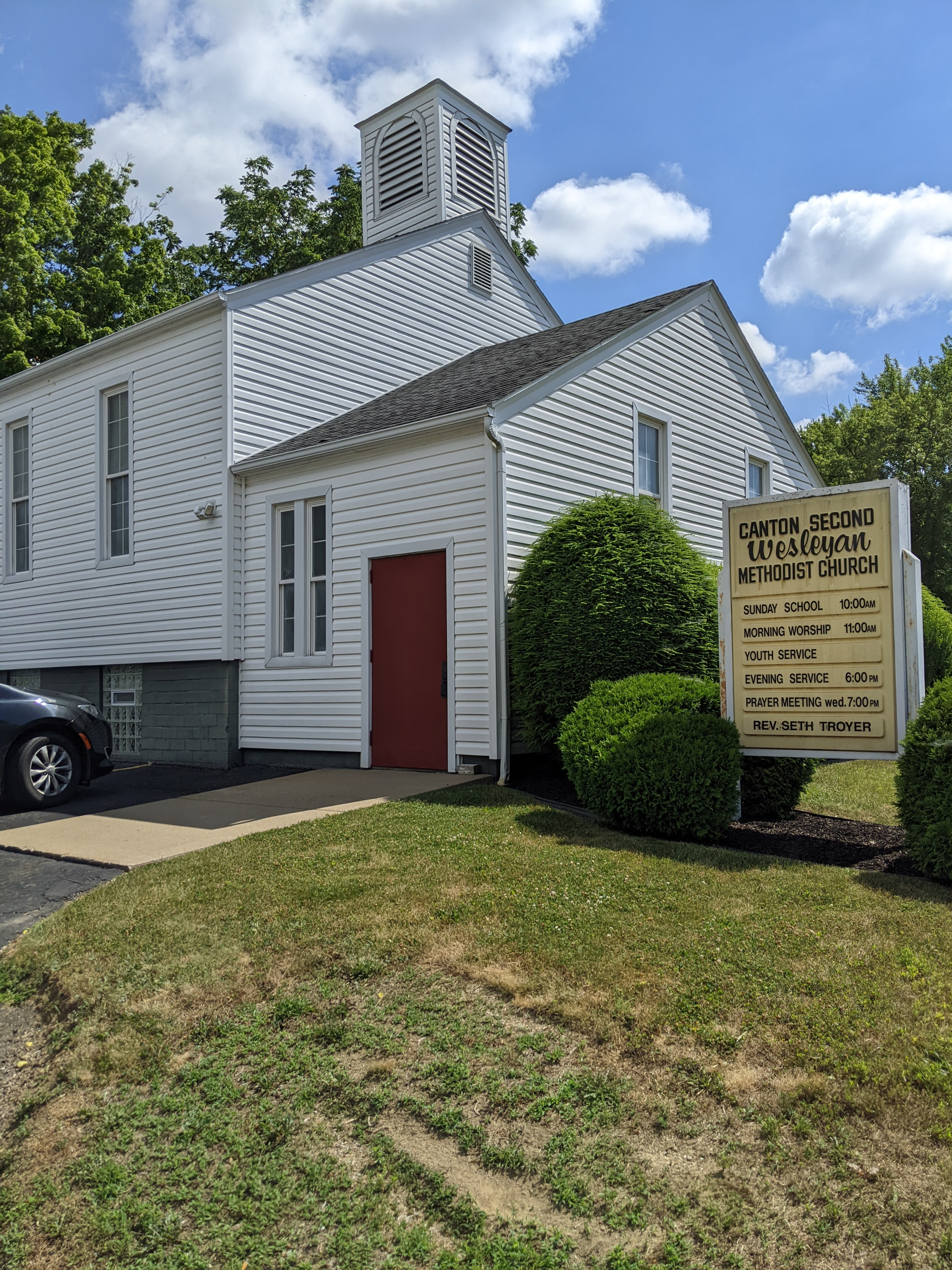
Second Wesleyan Methodist Church in Canton, Ohio

== See also ==
- Interchurch Holiness Convention
- Evangelical Methodist Church Conference
- Evangelical Wesleyan Church
- Primitive Methodist Church
- Quiverfull
