= Bible Methodist Connection of Churches =

Conservative holiness denomination

- Classification: Methodism
- Orientation: Conservative Holiness
- Polity: Connectionalism
- Connectional Chairman: Dr. Michael Avery
- Vice Chairman: Richard Miles
- Associations: Interchurch Holiness Convention (IHC)
- Founder: John Wesley
- Origin: 1967
- Separated from: Wesleyan Methodist Church (1967)
- Absorbed: United Holiness Church (1994); Pilgrim Nazarene Church (2019)
- Official website: biblemethodist.org

The Bible Methodist Connection of Churches is a Methodist denomination in the United States within the conservative holiness movement.

== History ==
In 1943, the General Conference of the Wesleyan Methodist Church recommended the strengthening of the “central supervisory authority to oversee the work of our Church.” The Wesleyan Methodist Church adopted a proposal in 1966 to merge with the Pilgrim Holiness Church, thus forming the Wesleyan Church; those who strongly disagreed with the merger, as well as the trend of greater centralization, formed the Bible Methodist Connection of Churches.

In 1994, the United Holiness Church, which broke from the Free Methodist Church in 1955, joined the Bible Methodist Connection of Churches.

In 2019, the Pilgrim Nazarene Church merged into the Bible Methodist Connection of Churches.

== Leadership, educational institutions, etc ==
The connection is divided into four regional conferences: the Southern Conference, led by Rev. Doug Eads; the Southwest Conference, led by Rev. Aaron Johnson; the Heartland Conference, led by Rev. Chris Cravens; and the Great Lakes Conference, led by Rev. David Ward.

The Bible Methodist Connection of Churches operate one Christian school, three family camps, and three youth camps.

Seminarians attend God's Bible School and College in Cincinnati and Hobe Sound Bible College in Hobe Sound.

== See also ==
- Allegheny Wesleyan Methodist Connection
- Bible Methodist Connection of Tennessee
- Primitive Methodist Church
- Interchurch Holiness Convention
