= Calvary Holiness Church (Philadelphia) =

River Brethren denomination of Christianity

- Type: Anabaptist
- Classification: River Brethren
- Orientation: Conservative Holiness Movement
- Origin: 1964
- Separated from: Brethren in Christ Church

The Calvary Holiness Church is a small River Brethren denomination of Christianity in the Radical Pietistic tradition and is part of the conservative holiness movement. It is a division from the Brethren in Christ Church.

== History ==
The origins of the Calvary Holiness Church are a part of the history of the River Brethren tradition of Anabaptist Christianity. The Calvary Holiness Church began in 1963 when the Philadelphia Brethren in Christ congregation (org. 1897) withdrew from the Brethren in Christ, rejecting perceived changes in the denomination's faith and practice. Members from various Brethren in Christ congregations, including those in Hanover, Millersburg, and Massillon, joined the Calvary Holiness Church, which incorporated in 1964. The Calvary Holiness Church sought to continue to emphasize the wearing of a headcovering (veil) by women, plain dress, temperance, washing of the saints' feet, and nonresistance. Members of the Calvary Holiness Church carefully observe the Lord's Day through worshipping God in Sunday morning and Sunday evening services. Calvary Holiness adherents do not join secret societies. By 1980, the Calvary Holiness Church had two congregations with about 40 members. The congregation in Apple Creek, Ohio, had an emphasis on youth ministry for a number of years.
