= Conservative holiness movement =

Christian movement

The conservative holiness movement is a loosely defined group of theologically conservative Christian denominations with the majority being Methodists whose teachings are rooted in the theology of John Wesley, and a minority being Quakers (Friends) that emphasize the doctrine of George Fox, as well as River Brethren who emerged out of the Radical Pietist revival, and Holiness Restorationists in the tradition of John Petit Brooks and Daniel Sidney Warner. Schisms began to occur in the 19th century and this movement became distinct from parent Holiness bodies in the mid-20th century amid disagreements over modesty in dress, entertainment, and other "old holiness standards". Aligned denominations share a belief in Christian perfection (entire sanctification), though they differ on various doctrines, such as the celebration of the sacraments and observance of ordinances, which is related to the denominational tradition of the specific conservative holiness body—Methodist, Quaker, Anabaptist or Restorationist. Many denominations identifying with the conservative holiness movement, though not all, are represented in the Interchurch Holiness Convention; while some denominations have full communion with one another, other bodies choose to be isolationist.

== Theological emphases ==
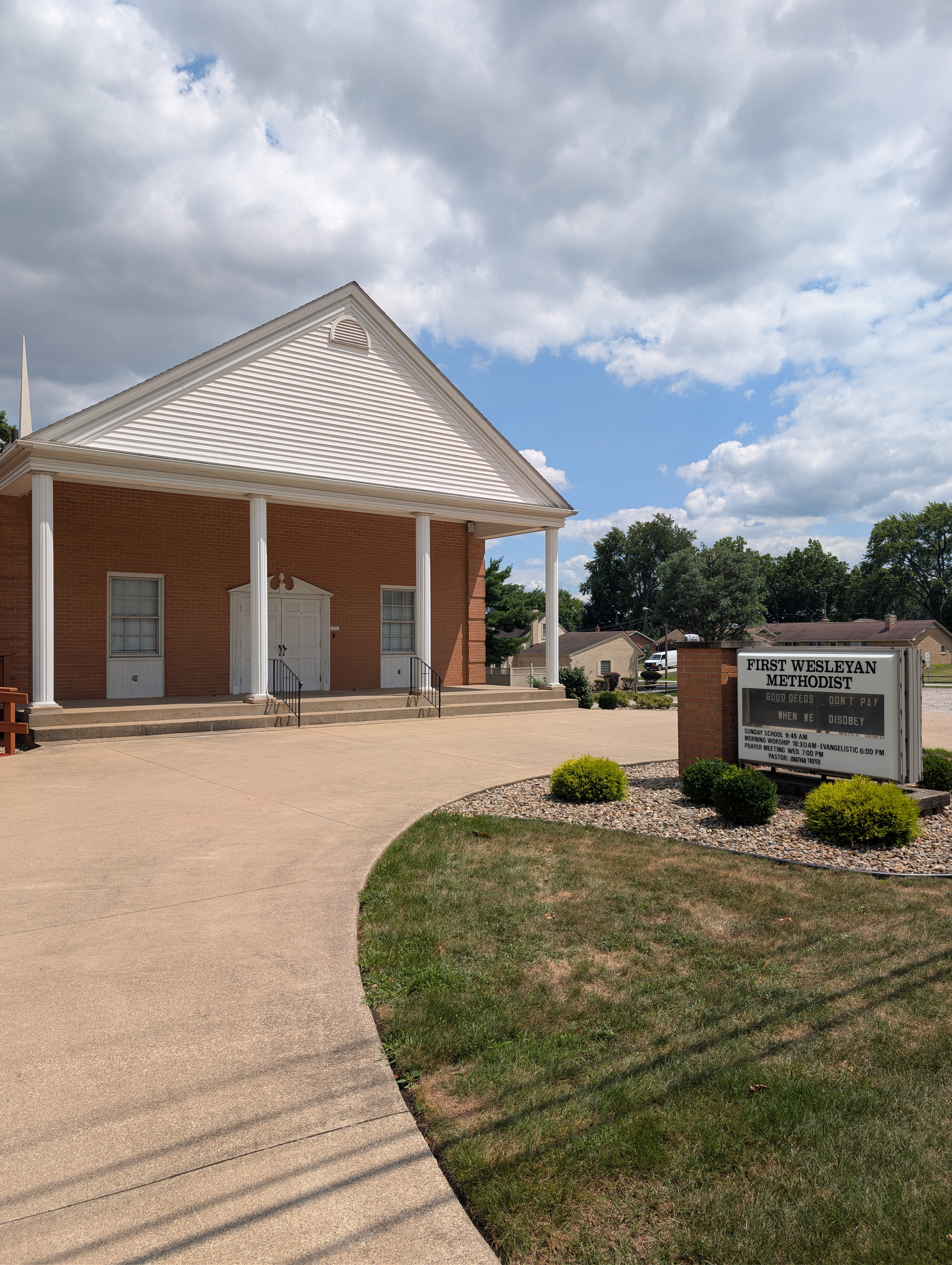
The sign of this Wesleyan Methodist church displays the times for the Sunday morning service of worship and Sunday evening service of worship, consistent with the historical First-day Sabbatarian doctrine of Methodism to keep the Lord's Day holy. The midweek Wednesday prayer service (a common Methodist observance) is indicated on the sign as well.

=== The nature of sin ===
The father of Methodism, John Wesley, taught that "Nothing is sin, strictly speaking, but a voluntary transgression of a known law of God. Therefore, every voluntary breach of the law of love is sin; and nothing else, if we speak properly. To strain the matter farther is only to make way for Calvinism." With this narrower understanding of sin, John Wesley believed that it was not only possible but necessary to live without committing sin. Wesley explains this in his comments on 1 John 3:8: "Whosoever abideth in communion with Him—By loving faith, sinneth not—While he so abideth. Whosoever sinneth certainly seeth Him not—The loving eye of his soul is not then fixed upon God; neither doth he then experimentally know Him—Whatever he did in time past." Holiness adherents therefore believe in the possibility and necessity of living a life without committing sin. Leading Holiness Scholar Leslie D. Wilcox concluded that "holiness writers, following the Wesleyan theology, define sin as a willful transgression of a known law of God." The Inter-Church Holiness Convention following John Wesley defines sin as "a willful transgression against a known law of God. This means that there must be knowledge of wrongdoing, or of refusing to obey God, before sin is committed. Mistakes are not sin." H. E. Schmul, the founder of the Inter-Church Holiness Convention actually explains how some of our "theological wunderkind" including S. D. Herron, and Leslie Wilcox came up with this definition:

An act of sin is any uncoerced word or thought or deed that violates the will of God, performed by an intelligent responsible person within the age of accountability done in defiance of God or not prompted by love to God or desire to please him. Sin, then, is a responsible act.

With this definition in mind, Christian denominations aligned with the Conservative Holiness Movement believe that "The lowest type of Christian sinneth not and is not condemned. The minimum of salvation is salvation from sinning." Following the lead of John Wesley, denominations identifying as being a part of the Conservative Holiness Movement hold that "calling every defect a sin, is not well pleasing to God." "Mistakes, and whatever infirmities necessarily flow from the corruptible state of the body, are no way contrary to love; nor therefore, in the Scripture sense, sin." This definition of sin is vitally important because "If this definition is compromised, victorious Christian living becomes meaningless, and entire sanctification an impossibility." Historian Charles Jones explains that "Believing that sin was conscious disobedience to a known law of God, holiness believers were convinced that the true Christian, having repented of every known act of sin, did not and could not willfully sin again and remain a Christian."

=== Entire Sanctification ===
The word Holiness refers specifically to the belief in entire sanctification as a definite, second work of grace, in which original sin is cleansed, the heart is made perfect in love, and the believer is empowered to serve God. The Conservative Holiness movement is known for its emphasis on the possibility, necessity, and instantaneous nature of Entire Sanctification, also known as 'Christian perfection' in Methodism and 'Perfectionism' in Quakerism, as well as the second work of grace. This doctrine is shown in the 1885 Declaration of Principles for the National Camp Meeting Association for Christian Holiness, which explained:

"Entire Sanctification... is that great work wrought subsequent to regeneration, by the Holy Ghost, upon the sole condition of faith...such faith being preceded by an act of solemn and complete consecration. This work has these distinct elements:

1. The entire extinction of the carnal mind, the total eradication of the birth principle of sin;
2. the communication of perfect love to the soul...
3. the abiding indwelling of the Holy Ghost."

The Book of Discipline of the Allegheny Wesleyan Methodist Connection explicates the doctrine of sanctification:

Entire sanctification is that work of the Holy Spirit by which the child of God is cleansed from all inbred sin through faith in Jesus Christ. It is subsequent to regeneration, and is wrought when the believer presents himself a living sacrifice, holy and acceptable unto God, and is thus enabled through grace to love God with all the heart and to walk in His holy commandments blameless.
Gen. 17:1; Deut. 30:6; Ps. 130:8; Ezek. 36:25–29; Matt. 5:48; Luke 1:74, 75; John 17:2–23; Rom. 8:3, 4; 11:26; 1 Cor. 6:11; 14:20; Eph. 4:13, 24; 5:25–27; Phil. 2:5, 7; Col. 4:12; 1 Thes. 3:10; 5:23; 2 Thes. 2:13; 2 Tim. 3:17; Tit. 2:12, 14; Heb. 9:13, 14; 10:14, 18–22; Jas. 1:27; 4:8; 1 Pet. 1:10; 2 Pet. 1:4; 1 John 1:7, 9; 3:8, 9; 4:17, 18; Jude 24.

John Wesley, who articulated the doctrine, taught that those who had been entirely sanctified would be perfect in love, engaging in works of piety and works of mercy—both of which are characteristic of a believer's growing in grace.

=== Plain lifestyle ===
Members of the Conservative Holiness movement generally hold that the lifestyle restrictions found in the New Testament are still binding today and must be followed. This generally shows up in areas of entertainment, keeping the Sunday Sabbath, and modest clothing.

This is taught in the doctrine of outward holiness (for Methodist denominations in the conservative holiness movement), the testimony of simplicity (for Quaker yearly meetings in the conservative holiness movement), the doctrine of nonconformity to the world (for River Brethren denominations in the conservative holiness movement), and the principle of separation from the world (for Restorationist denominations in the conservative holiness movement).

Though there is variety in application of these principles, there is general consensus that they must be followed.

== History ==
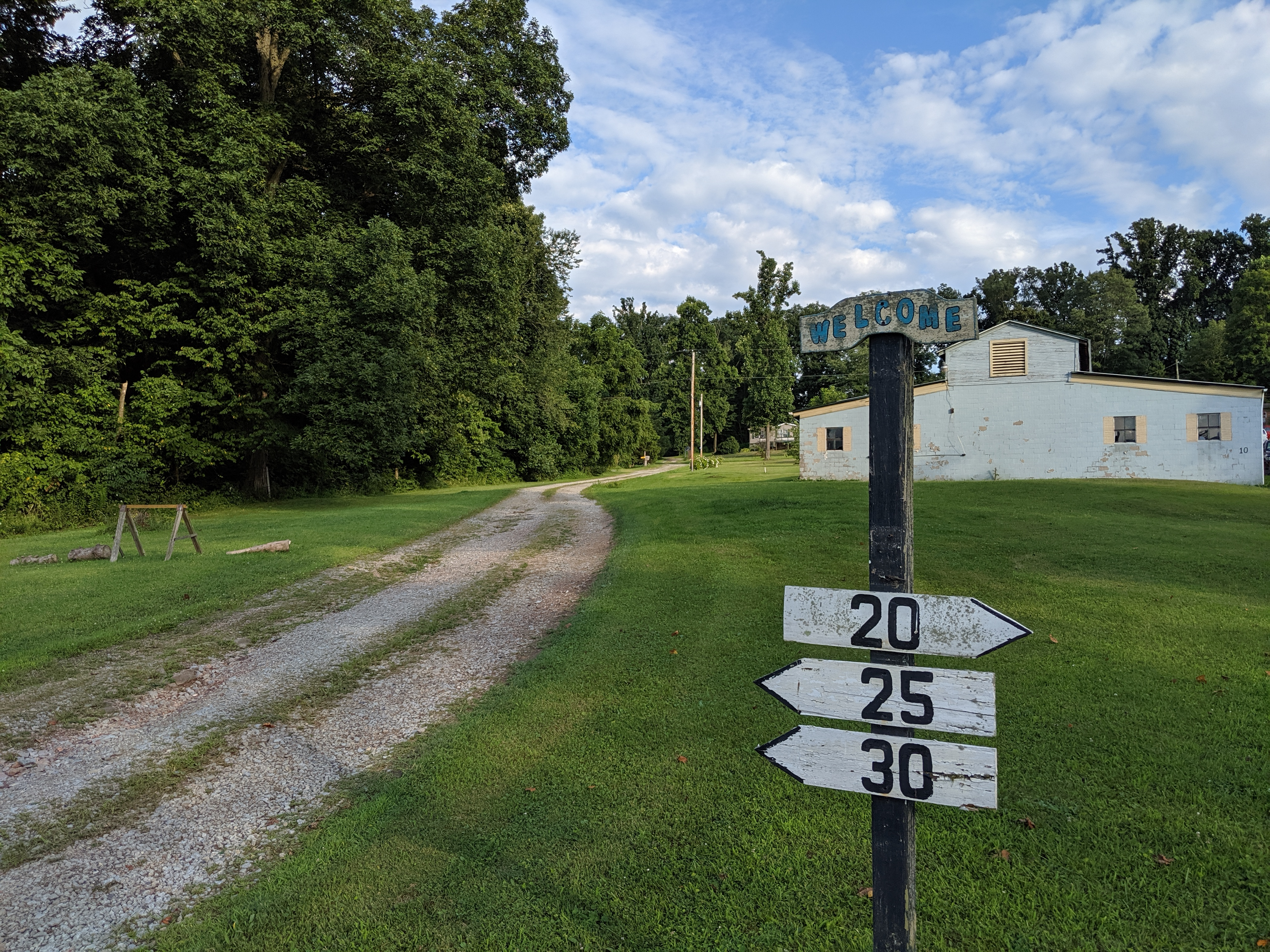
The tabernacle of Flatwoods Reformed Free Methodist Campground, which served as the location of the annual camp meeting of the Reformed Free Methodist Church, one of the earliest denominations of the conservative holiness movement

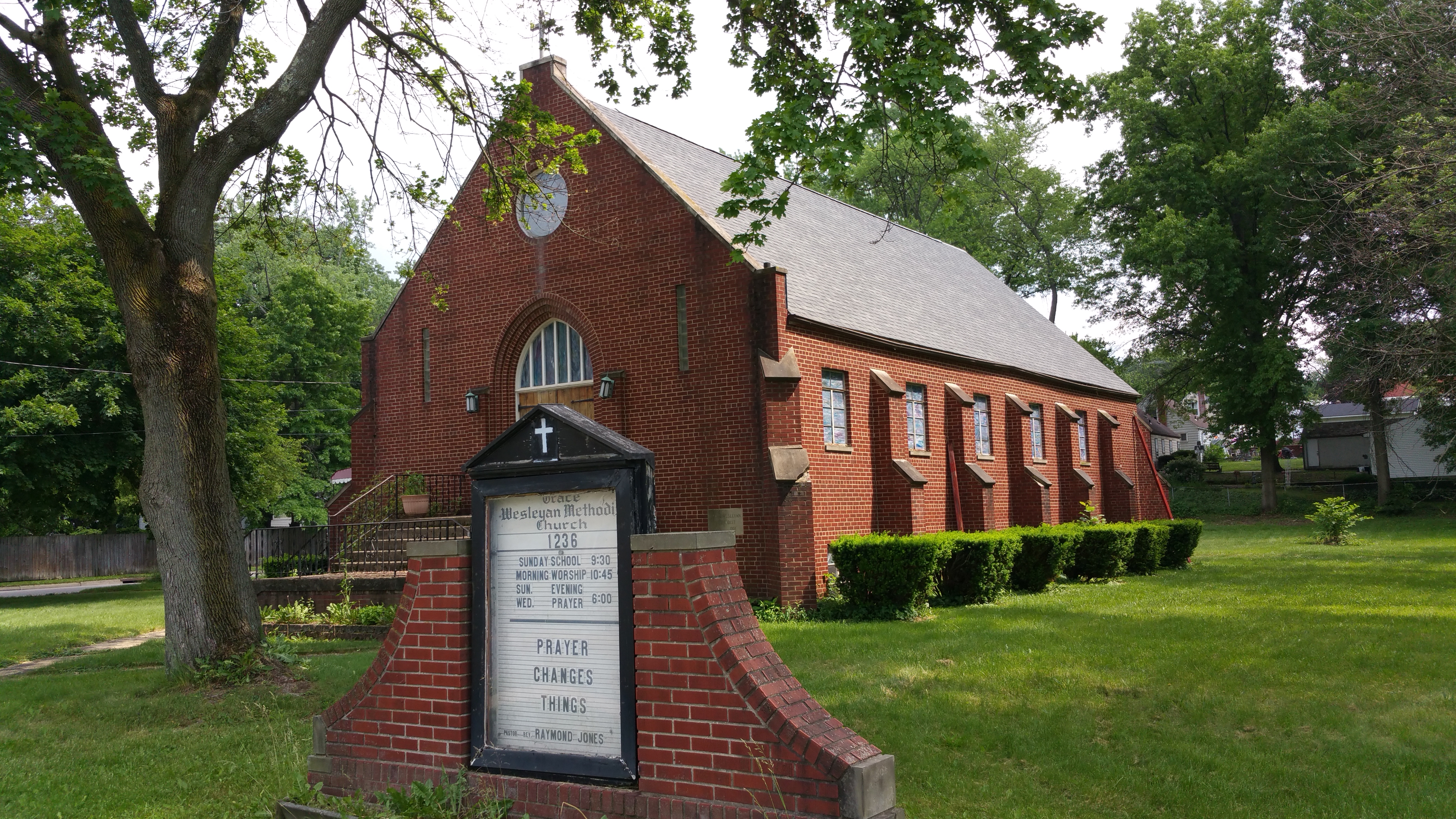
Grace Wesleyan Methodist Church is a parish church of the Allegheny Wesleyan Methodist Connection and is located in Akron, Ohio.

The Holiness movement was largely contained within mainline Methodism during the 19th century, with some members of the holiness movement continuing to remain in the mainline Methodist Churches to this day (the "stay-inners"). Wesleyan-Holiness doctrine influenced adherents of other denominations as well. By the 1880s a persistent wave of "come-outism" was beginning to gather steam. The come-outers were concerned that mainline Methodism had begun to water-down Holiness teachings and even shun its more outspoken proponents.

The majority of the denominations which now comprise the Conservative holiness movement were once among a number of Holiness movement groups which had a history of coming out or having left mainline Methodism to teach and practice Holiness doctrine uninhibited. The denominations that left mainline Methodism and the mainstream holiness movement to form the conservative holiness movement did so because they saw a relaxation of the prohibitions on certain behaviours that they considered to be "worldly". The list of prohibitions varies from denomination to denomination, but the prohibitions include the wearing of gold (which includes wedding rings), television in the home (an extension to previous bans on theater patronage), women not cutting their hair (in accordance with historic interpretations of I Corinthians 11), the prohibition of men wearing shorts, the prohibition of women wearing short skirts, and the prohibition of patronizing sporting events on the Sunday Sabbath. Members of denominations in the conservative holiness movement align themselves with the temperance movement and practice teetotalism, thus abstaining from alcohol and other drugs. Each major denomination enforces some of the disciplines listed above, so there is some variation amongst the groups. It is these disciplines that characterize the Churches of the conservative holiness movement.

The Church of God (Holiness) was created as a result of a schism with the Methodist Episcopal Church in 1883 due to differences in interpretation of the Methodist doctrine of Christian perfection, as well as standards of dress. In the Restorationist tradition, the Church of God (Guthrie, Oklahoma) left the Church of God (Anderson, Indiana) in the 1910s due to issues concerning "worldly conformity in dress". The body that is now the Bible Holiness Church originated in 1896 as a schism with the Wesleyan Methodist Church and originally had a Holiness Pentecostal orientation; the Bible Holiness Church, however, formally rejected the possibility of a third work of grace in 1948. The Central Yearly Meeting of Friends is a Quaker Yearly Meeting emphasizing George Fox's doctrine of perfectionism and was founded in 1924. The Reformed Free Methodist Church left the Free Methodist Church in 1932; the Immanuel Missionary Church and the Emmanuel Association of Churches left the Pilgrim Holiness Church in 1936 and 1941, respectively—these schisms were due to what the departing bodies perceived as a laxity in traditional doctrine and standards. Samuel West spearheaded the formation of the Reformed Free Methodist Church, which held its annual Flatwoods Camp Meeting in Perryopolis, Pennsylvania; the RFMC emphasized the traditional Methodist doctrine of plain dress. The Emmanuel Association, belonging to the subgroup of "Holiness Pacifists" in the conservative holiness movement, is known for its opposition to warfare and its holiness standards are codified in a manual known as "Principles of Holy Living"; the Immanuel Missionary Church, the First Bible Holiness Church and the Church of God likewise teach nonresistance and are conscientious objectors, thus falling under this category too.

The Holiness movement, for the most part, huddled together tightly from its early history to later when Pentecostalism was competing for the hearts and minds of its adherents. During the Fundamentalist–Modernist Controversy of the 1920s and onward, most Holiness groups found themselves at home in the Fundamentalist camp or allied with them. While many Holiness groups made the jump toward the Evangelical movement in the late 1930s, there were groups that felt their Holiness peers were drifting away from Biblical inerrancy and separation from the world.

By the post-World War II era, a more relaxed societal attitude toward morality and theological differences continued to accompany many mainstream Holiness conferences, districts and local churches reinforcing longstanding prohibitions on behavior in their governing documents. Not at home with other Fundamentalist alliances (which had a more Calvinistic and non-Holiness tone to them), an Interdenominational Holiness Convention (IHC) was called at a Wesleyan Methodist campground in Fairmont, Indiana, in 1951, though it did not include all denominations that are characterized as belonging to the conservative holiness movement, especially those of a more isolationist nature. Entire sanctification (in Methodism) or Perfectionism (in Quakerism), as well as traditional holiness strictures on dress and entertainment, held a prominent place in convention sermons. The swelling divorce rate, the relentless spread of Communism (with its promotion of state atheism), and the effects of television on society were also prominent themes. Participants resisted a call to form a new denomination, but became an ally toward a series of prior and future institutional secessions.

In 1955 the Bible Missionary Church (BMC) was formed in Idaho and soon grew nationwide as local congregations left the Church of the Nazarene over "worldliness" issues.

In 1963, another schism in the Free Methodist Church led to the formation of the Evangelical Wesleyan Church (EWC).

In 1963, the Pilgrim Holiness Church of New York seceded from the Pilgrim Holiness Church to become an independent organization (in 1966–68, the Wesleyan Methodist Church and the Pilgrim Holiness Church proposed a merger to form the Wesleyan Church, which today has more in common with the Christian Holiness Partnership-affiliated Holiness churches such as the Nazarene Church).

The Brethren in Christ Church, a River Brethren denomination that emerged out of Radical Pietism, entered into a schism in 1963 resulting in the formation of the Calvary Holiness Church, a conservative holiness denomination which continues to emphasize traditional River Brethren beliefs, such as the wearing of a headcovering by women, plain dress, temperance, footwashing, and pacifism.

In 1966, the Church of the Bible Covenant was created as a result of a schism with the Church of the Nazarene under the leadership of Remiss Rehfeldt and Marvin Powers; in August 1988, the Church of the Bible Covenant largely became the International Fellowship of Bible Churches, though at that time, a minority of Covenanters joined the International Conservative Holiness Association.

In the wake of the Wesleyan Church merger, the Bible Methodist Connection of Churches, the Allegheny Wesleyan Methodist Connection of Churches, the Bible Methodist Connection of Tennessee (Tennessee Bible Methodists), the Bible Methodist Connection of Alabama (Alabama Bible Methodists), Bible Methodist Connection Mid-America (formed in 2018), and Pilgrim Holiness Church (Midwest Conference), were organized.

In 1973, the Fellowship of Independent Methodist Churches was formed in the British Isles after a number of congregations left the Methodist Church in Ireland and the Free Methodist Church due to their opposition to what they perceived was ecumenism with branches of Christianity that espoused Modernism.

God's Missionary Church was formed by individuals affected by tent revival services.

Social change constantly confronts Conservative Holiness Christians. The Church of God (Holiness) in 1999 removed a ban on owning televisions, urging charity over “the ownership or use of television, videos, movies, the internet, and such like.” Other denominations in the conservative holiness movement, such as the Evangelical Wesleyan Church, continue to forbid the watching of television, which they hold to be an occasion of sin. Issues over doctrine and standards have resulted in schisms in denominations identifying with the conservative holiness movement too; for example, in 1979, a schism in the body now called the Bible Holiness Church resulted in the formation of the Wesleyan Holiness Alliance. The Wesleyan Holiness Association of Churches, the Wesleyan Bible Holiness Church, the United Missionary Church, the Churches of Wesleyan Brethren, and the Pilgrim Nazarene Church originated as a result of schisms with the Bible Missionary Church, with the former being established under the leadership of Glen Griffith in 1959 to uphold the discipline of prohibiting remarriage after divorce and the latter departing in 2003 "over personal commercial use of the Internet." However, mergers have occurred as well; for example, in August 2019 the Pilgrim Nazarene Church (PNC) voted to join the Bible Methodist Connection. While not all the churches took part in the merger, it is estimated that approximately two-thirds of the PNC churches joined the Bible Methodist Connection.

== Denominations ==
Denominations and associations of churches aligned with the conservative holiness movement include certain Methodist, Quaker, River Brethren and Restorationist bodies, though independent churches exist too:

=== Methodist ===
Oakland Mills Methodist Campground, which belongs to the Evangelical Methodist Church Conference (located in Oakland Mills, Pennsylvania)

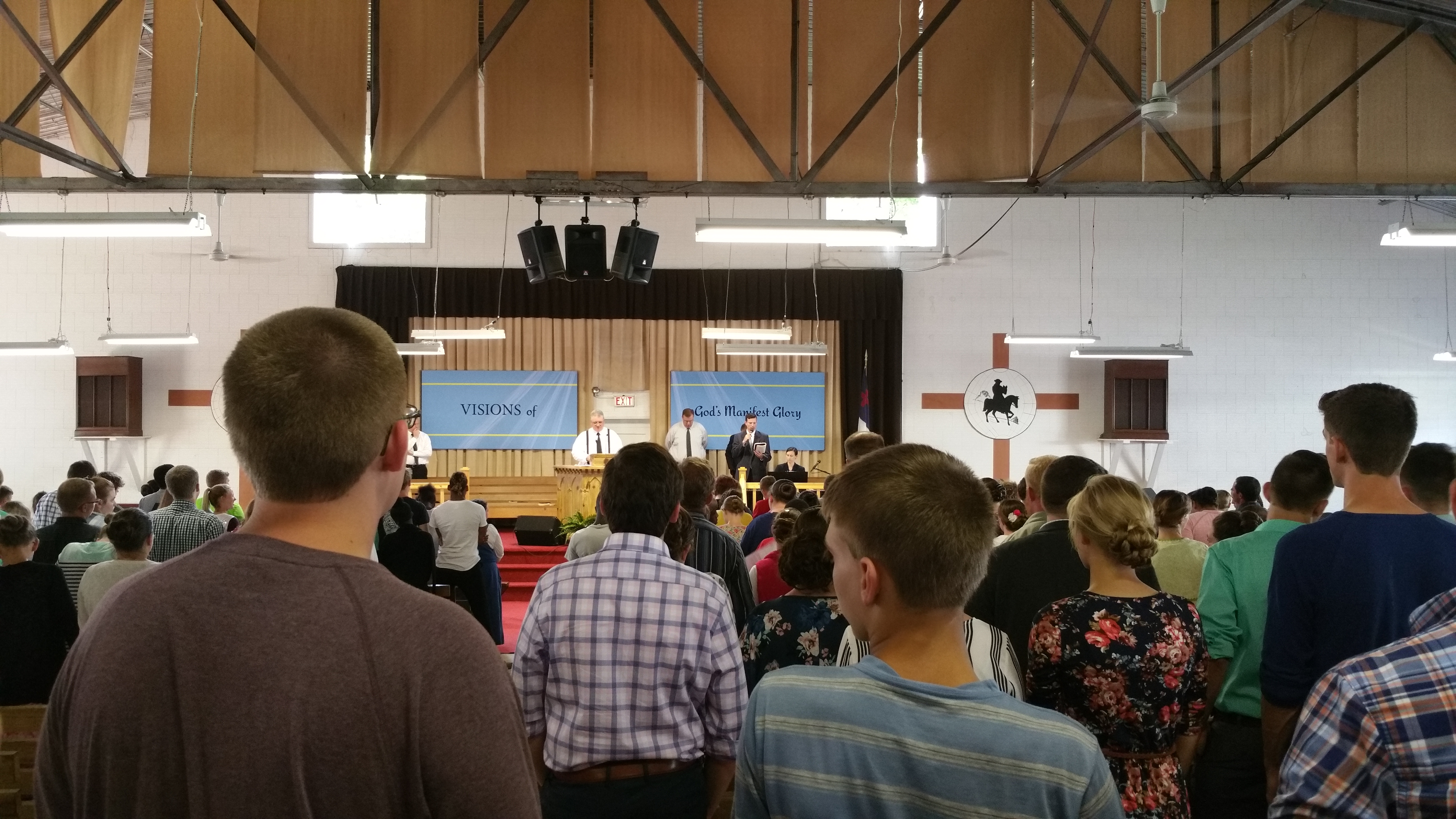
A service of worship at the tabernacle of a camp meeting of the Allegheny Wesleyan Methodist Connection, held at Methodist Campground in Stoneboro, Pennsylvania

- Allegheny Wesleyan Methodist Connection
- Bible Holiness Church
- Bible Methodist Connection of Churches
- Bible Methodist Connection of Tennessee
- Bible Missionary Church
- Churches of Wesleyan Brethren
- Crusaders Churches of America
- Emmanuel Association
- Evangelical Methodist Church Conference
- Evangelical Wesleyan Church
- Faith Missionary Association
- Fellowship of Independent Methodist Churches
- First Bible Holiness Church
- God's Missionary Church
- Grace Tabernacle Church
- Hephzibah Holiness Association (not formally a denomination, but somewhat functions as such)
- Immanuel Missionary Church
- International Fellowship of Bible Churches
- International Conservative Holiness Association
- Pilgrim Holiness Church (Midwest Conference)
- Pilgrim Holiness Church of New York
- Reformed Free Methodist Church
- United Holiness Church (Southeast Indiana)
- United Missionary Church
- Wesleyan Bible Holiness Church
- Wesleyan Holiness Association of Churches
- Wesleyan Holiness Alliance
- Wesleyan Nazarene Church
- Wesleyan Missionary Church
- Wesleyan Tabernacle Association

=== Quaker ===
- Central Yearly Meeting of Friends

=== River Brethren ===
- Calvary Holiness Church (Philadelphia)

=== Restorationist ===
- Church of God (Holiness)
- Church of God (Guthrie, Oklahoma)
- House of Prayer

== Diversity in belief and practice ==
Christian denominations aligned with the conservative holiness movement all share a belief in the doctrine of Christian perfection (entire sanctification); apart from this, denominations identified with the conservative holiness movement differ on several issues, given that there are Methodist, Quaker, Anabaptist and Restorationist churches that comprise the conservative holiness movement and these denominations have unique doctrines. Methodist denominations that are a part of the conservative holiness movement, such as the Allegheny Wesleyan Methodist Connection or Evangelical Wesleyan Church, affirm the celebration of the sacraments, chiefly Holy Baptism and Holy Communion; on the other hand, denominations of the Quaker tradition, such as the Central Yearly Meeting of Friends, are entirely non-sacramental. Anabaptist denominations aligned with the conservative holiness movement, such as the Calvary Holiness Church—a River Brethren group—teach the observance of ordinances, such as baptism by trine immersion, communion, headcovering and footwashing. While the Methodist denominations of the conservative holiness movement hold to church membership (such as the Evangelical Methodist Church Conference), the concept of membership rolls is rejected in conservative holiness denominations of a Restorationist background, such as the Church of God (Guthrie, Oklahoma).

== Educational institutions ==
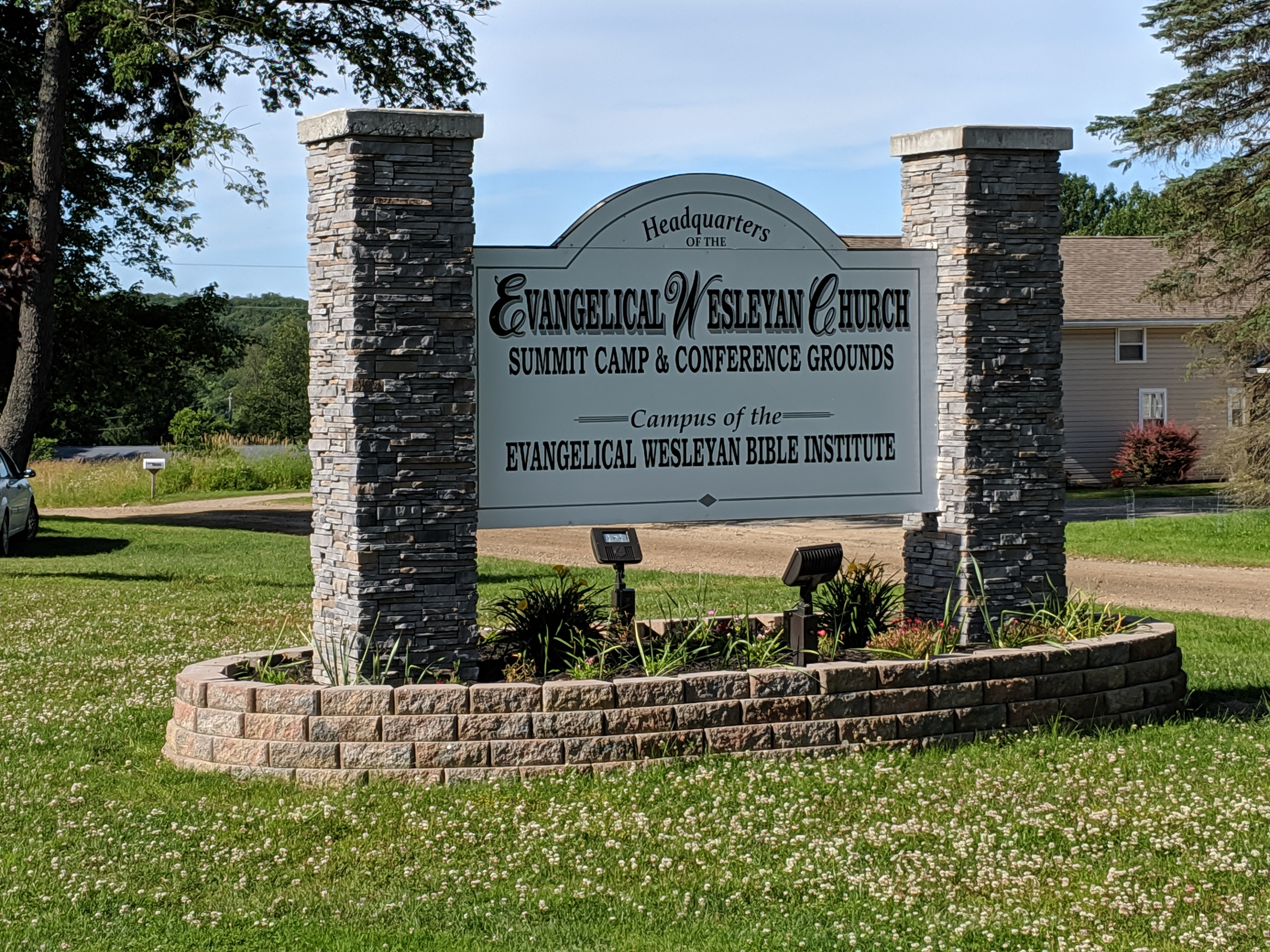
The entrance to the Evangelical Wesleyan Bible Institute (EWBI) in Cooperstown

There are a number of elementary, middle and high schools affiliated with various denominations of the conservative holiness movement. Colleges affiliated with the conservative holiness movement include:

- Allegheny Wesleyan College (Salem, OH)
- Bible Missionary Institute (Rock Island, IL)
- Covenant Foundation College (Knightstown, IN) [closed]
- Evangelical Wesleyan Bible Institute (Cooperstown, PA)
- Faith Bible School (Mitchell, SD)
- God's Bible School (Cincinnati, OH)
- Hobe Sound Bible College (Hobe Sound, FL)
- Immanuel Missionary College (Shoals, IN) [closed]
- John Fletcher Christian College (Axtell, NE) [closed]
- Kansas Christian College (Overland Park, Kansas)
- Northwest Indian Bible Institute (Alberton, MT)
- Penn View Bible Institute (Penns Creek, PA)
- Peoples Bible College (Colorado Springs, CO) [closed]
- Thompson Bible Institute (Bellevue, OH) [closed]
- Union Bible College and Academy (Westfield, IN)
- Wesleyan Holiness Bible College/West Virginia Training School (Point Pleasant, WV)

== Missions ==
A number of mission endeavors exist within the conservative holiness movement with active mission fields in the Philippines, South Africa, Ukraine, Haiti, Peru, Mexico, Asia, Eastern Europe, India, Myanmar, and South Korea. Listed below are a few of the mission organizations affiliated with the conservative holiness movement. Most of the denominations listed above also maintain their own missions boards and departments for both Home and Foreign Missions.

- Bible Methodist Missions
- Evangelical Bible Mission
- Evangelistic Faith Missions
- Hope International Missions
- Worldwide Faith Missions
- Pilgrim Missions
- Society of Indian Missions
- ICHA Ministries

== Publications ==
Publications, publishing companies, periodicals and discipleship tools affiliated with the conservative holiness movement include:

- Convention Herald – publication of the Interchurch Holiness Convention
- God's Revivalist (Cincinnati, OH) – affiliated with God's Bible School and College since the late 1800s.
- God's Missionary Standard – the publication of God's Missionary Church
- Pilgrim News – the publication of the Pilgrim Holiness Church
- Schmul Publishing Co. (Nicholasville, KY) – specializing in Wesleyan-Holiness reprints
- The Alert – the publication of the Fellowship of Independent Methodist Churches
- The Allegheny Wesleyan Methodist – the publication of the Allegheny Wesleyan Methodist Connection
- The Convention Pulpit – the podcast of the Interchurch Holiness Convention
- The Earnest Christian – the publication of the Evangelical Wesleyan Church
- The Eleventh Hour Messenger – the publication of the Wesleyan Holiness Association of Churches
- The Gospel Truth – the publication of the Church of God (Guthrie, Oklahoma)
- The Holiness Evangelist – the publication of the International Conservative Holiness Association
- The Immanuel Missionary – the publication of the Immanuel Missionary Church

== See also ==
- Apostolic Christian Church (Nazarene), a conservative Anabaptist denomination teaching entire sanctification
- Apostolic Faith Church, a Holiness Pentecostal denomination teaching conservative standards
- Conservative Anabaptism, a conservative strain of Christianity emphasizing obedience to Scriptural commands

== Bibliography ==
- The Holiness Churches: A Significant Ethical Tradition, Donald W. Dayton
- The Holiness Heritage, by Dr. Brian Black
- A Social Science Perspective On The Conservative Holiness Movement, John Johnson
- The History and Development of Bible Methodism, A. Philip Brown II
- The History And Organization Of The Wesleyan Church, Bayview Wesleyan Church
- Allegheny Wesleyan Methodist Connection Discipline, Allegheny Wesleyan Methodist Connection of Churches
- Constitution of the Bible Methodist Connection of Churches, Bible Methodist Connection of Churches
- Pilgrim Holiness Church of New York – Who We Are, Pilgrim Holiness Church of New York
- A Presentation Of Perfection, Dr. Mark Eckart (Mainline Wesleyan)
- Handbook of Denominations, by Frank S. Mead, Samuel S. Hill, & Craig D. Atwood
- The Conservative Holiness Movement: A, Historical Appraisal The Conservative Holiness Movement: A Historical Appraisal, by Wallace Thornton Jr.
- From Glory to Glory: A Brief Summary of Holiness Beliefs and Practice, Wallace Thornton Jr.
- Radical Righteousness: Personal Ethics and the Development of the Holiness Movement, Wallace Thornton Jr.
