= Fellowship of Independent Methodist Churches =

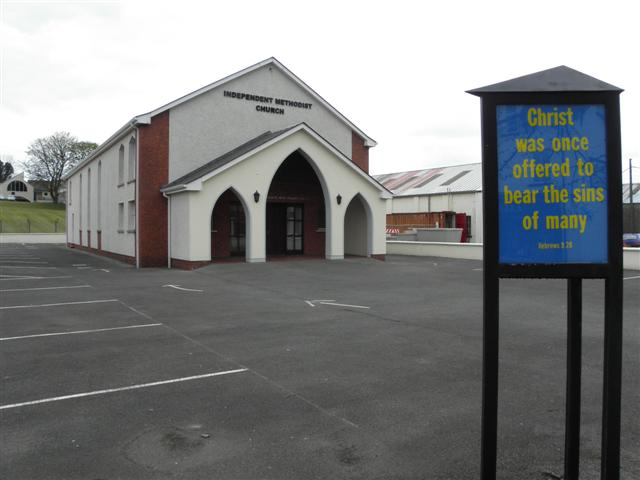
- Lisnaskea Independent Methodist Church is a local church belonging to the Fellowship of Independent Methodist Churches
- Classification: Methodism
- Orientation: Conservative holiness movement
- Polity: Connexionalism
- Origin: 1973
- Separated from: Methodist Church in Ireland and Free Methodist Church (1973)
- Official website: http://www.fimc.info/

The Fellowship of Independent Methodist Churches (FIMC) is a Methodist denomination aligned with the conservative holiness movement that is based in the British Isles, with mission partners around the world.

The history of the Fellowship of Independent Methodist Churches is a part of the larger history of Methodism in the British Isles, with the connexion forming as the result of a number of congregations departing both the Methodist Church in Ireland and the Free Methodist Church in 1973 due to the rise of liberalism in those denominations.

The fellowship is theologically conservative, aiming to uphold the original ethos of early Methodism. Though each congregation calls its own minister, a General Council of ministers and delegates meet monthly to manage the work of the FIMC.

Local congregations use the abbreviation "IMC" after their name, e.g. Omagh IMC, representing the full name Omagh Independent Methodist Church.

The Fellowship of Independent Methodist Churches adheres to Wesleyan theology, teaching two sacraments, Baptism and Communion. It holds to the Methodist two-pronged emphasis of the New Birth (a first work of grace) and entire sanctification (a second definite work of grace). From its inception the Fellowship has had a strong evangelistic thrust regularly carrying out various forms of gospel outreach throughout Northern Ireland.

A quarterly magazine called The Alert is regularly published by the Fellowship of Independent Methodist Churches.
