= Interchurch Holiness Convention =

- Orientation: Conservative Holiness
- Chairman of the Board: Rodney Loper
- Vice Chairman: Jonathan Edwards
- General Secretary: James Plank
- Official website: https://ihconvention.com/

The Interchurch Holiness Convention (IHC), formerly the Interdenominational Holiness Convention, is an ecumenical organization of denominations and congregations within the conservative holiness movement. Aligned with the conservative holiness movement, the majority of these IHC members are Methodist, though others have a Quaker, Anabaptist or Restorationist background. There are a number of denominations aligned with the conservative holiness movement, however, that are not affiliated with the Interchurch Holiness Convention. The IHC was founded in 1952 during the post-World War II era. Thousands of individuals are present at the Interchurch Holiness Convention's annual international meeting that is usually held in Dayton, Ohio or in Gatlinburg, Tennessee; in addition the Interchurch Holiness Convention hosts regional meetings at local churches in different parts of the world throughout the year.

They describe themselves as: "a friendly connection of organizations and ministries world-wide committed to 'Spreading Scriptural Holiness across these lands.'" The Interchurch Holiness Convention's General Secretary is James Plank.

== Doctrine ==
The Interchurch Holiness Convention is identified by their emphasis on "Spreading Scriptural Holiness". The convention's concept of Holiness is described in their statement of faith: "the tendency to evil is inherited by every member of the human race." However, "We, the Holiness People, believe that deliverance from indwelling sin is promised to the believing soul. It is to be realized subsequent to regeneration and is to be experienced in this life. This crisis is to be accomplished within the believer by the work of the Holy Spirit as He comes in Pentecostal measure, purging out the carnal mind and filling the soul with the fullness of God." This experience, the second work of grace, is generally described as entire sanctification that leads to a state of Christian perfection.

IHC also believes that a life free of willful sin is possible, and required for all believers to maintain their relationship with God. They state that "the purpose of the Saviour’s coming and the object of His dying were not to make it possible for man to sin without penalty, but rather that in heart sin should be dealt with so that in his life it should be made to cease."

== Members ==
- Allegheny Wesleyan Methodist Connection
- Bible Holiness Church
- Bible Methodist Connection of Churches
- Bible Missionary Church
- Central Yearly Meeting of Friends
- Church of God (Holiness)
- Evangelical Methodist Church Conference
- God's Missionary Church
- International Conservative Holiness Association
- Pilgrim Holiness Church
- Wesleyan Holiness Church
- Wesleyan Nazarene Church
- Individual congregations and districts of the Free Methodist Church, Global Methodist Church, Church of the Nazarene, Salvation Army, and Wesleyan Church

== See also ==
- Christian Holiness Partnership
- Wesleyan Holiness Consortium
- Global Wesleyan Alliance
