= Connexionalism =

Methodist ecclesiastical polity

Connexionalism, also spelled connectionalism, is the theological understanding and foundation of Methodist ecclesiastical polity, as practised in the Methodist Church in Britain, Ireland, Caribbean and the Americas, United Methodist Church, Global Methodist Church, Free Methodist Church, African Methodist Episcopal and Episcopal Zion churches, Bible Methodist Connection of Churches, Christian Methodist Episcopal Church, and many of the countries where Methodism was established by missionaries sent out from these churches. It refers to the way in which Methodist churches and other institutions are connected and work together to support one another, share resources, and carry out mission and ministry. The United Methodist Church defines connection as the principle that "all leaders and congregations are connected in a network of loyalties and commitments that support, yet supersede, local concerns". Accordingly, the primary decision-making bodies in Methodism are conferences, which serve to gather together representatives of various levels of church hierarchy.

In the United Methodist Church, Global Methodist Church and Free Methodist Church, where bishops provide church leadership, connexionalism is a variation of episcopal polity. Many Methodist churches, such as the British Methodist Church, do not have bishops. In world Methodism, a given connexion (that is, denomination) is usually autonomous.

== Etymology and history ==
In the 18th century, "connexion" (the period spelling of connection) referred to networks of individuals linked to a person or group, including in political, commercial, and religious spheres. It was used to denote the Methodist societies connected with the person of John Wesley, and connexion remains the preferred spelling in Britain, the Commonwealth, and Ireland. "Connection" is the spelling historically used in American Methodism and by groups descended from the Methodist Episcopal Church.

== History ==
In the history of Christianity in England, a connexion was a circuit of prayer groups who would employ travelling ministers alongside the regular ministers attached to each congregation. This method of organizing emerged in 18th-century English nonconformist religious circles. The Countess of Huntingdon's Connexion, for instance, was founded by Selina, Countess of Huntingdon. Over time, as Methodism became a separate church, this structure of connexions came to form a new system of polity, separate from episcopal polity.

== British and Irish Methodism ==
Connexional polity in Britain has always been characterized by a strong central organization which holds an annual conference. The church organisation, referred to as "The Connexion", is divided into districts in the charge of a chair. Methodist districts often correspond approximately, in geographical terms, to counties – as do Church of England dioceses. The districts are divided into circuits governed by the circuit meeting and led and administered principally by a superintendent minister. Ministers are appointed to circuits rather than to individual churches. Most notably, there are no bishops in the British connexion. The term full connexion is used in Great Britain and in Ireland to refer to presbyters and deacons being "subject to the rules and discipline of the Conference of the Methodist Church", and specifically that they are subject to being stationed (i.e. appointed to ministry in a local circuit) at the direction of the conference.

== American Methodism ==
Free Methodist churches and United Methodist churches are generally organized on a connexional model, related but not identical to that used in Britain. Pastors are assigned to congregations by bishops, distinguishing it from presbyterian government. Methodist denominations typically give lay members representation at regional and national meetings (conferences) at which the business of the church is conducted,making it different from most episcopal government. This connexional organizational model differs further from the congregational model, for example of Baptist and Congregationalist churches.

== See also ==
- Circuit rider (religious)
