= History of Methodism in the United States =

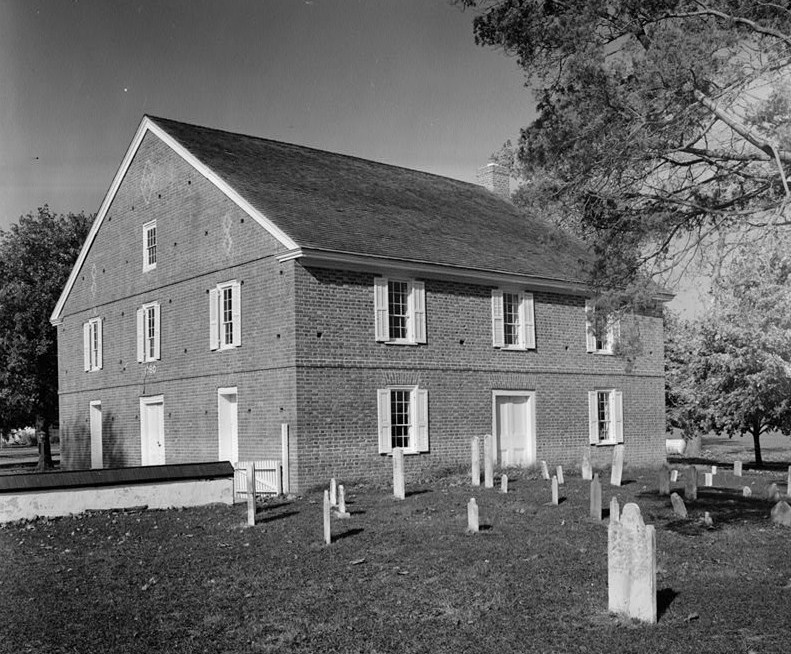
Barratt's Chapel, built in 1780, is the second oldest Methodist Church in the United States built for that purpose. The church was a meeting place of Asbury and Coke.

The history of Methodism in the United States dates back to the mid-18th century with the ministries of early Methodist preachers such as Laurence Coughlan and Robert Strawbridge. Following the American Revolution most of the Anglican clergy who had been in America came back to England. John Wesley, the founder of Methodism, sent Thomas Coke to America where he and Francis Asbury founded the Methodist Episcopal Church, which was to later establish itself as the largest denomination in America during the 19th century.

Methodism thrived in America thanks to the First and Second Great Awakenings beginning in the 1700s. Various African-American denominations were formed during this period, including the African Methodist Episcopal Church.

In the early 20th century, many of the splintered Methodist groups joined to form the Methodist Church (USA). Another merger in 1968 resulted in the formation of the United Methodist Church from the Evangelical United Brethren (EUB) and the Methodist Church.

Other smaller Methodist denominations in the United States, including those that separated from the Methodist Episcopal Church or the descendant denominations themselves, exist, such as the Free Methodist Church, Global Methodist Church, Evangelical Methodist Church, Congregational Methodist Church, Allegheny Wesleyan Methodist Connection and Bible Methodist Connection of Churches, among others.

== Origins in America ==
Further information: Methodism § Origins In 1735, the Wesley brothers, John and Charles, went to the Georgia Colony to minister to the colonialists and teach the Gospel to European settlers and Native American tribes. They sailed from England aboard the Simmonds, departing on October 14. During the voyage, the ship encountered a violent storm that spread fear amongst many passengers. However, a group of Christians from the Moravian Church remained surprisingly calm. Wesley was impressed by their unwavering faith, leading him to question the depth of his own spiritual assurance. His original purpose for the mission was to minister to the Native American people. However, during his time in Georgia, his understanding of salvation was primarily works-oriented, emphasizing moral conduct over faith. This period reflects his early theological stance, which would later evolve significantly after his return to England. Charles Wesley, accompanying his brother, became the Secretary for Indian Affairs.

John Wesley returned to England and met with the Moravian Church, a group of clergymen he respected. He said, "they appeared to be of one heart, as well as of one judgment, resolved to be Bible-Christians at all events; and, wherever they were, to preach with all their might plain, old, Bible Christianity." The Wesley ministers retained their membership in the Church of England. Though not always emphasized or appreciated in the Anglican churches of their day, their teaching emphasized salvation by God's grace, apprehended through faith in Christ. Three teachings they saw as the foundation of Christian faith were:

1. People are all, by nature, "dead in sin," and, consequently, "children of wrath."
2. They are "justified by faith alone."
3. Faith produces inward and outward holiness.

Very quickly, these clergymen became popular, attracting large congregations. The nickname students had used against the Wesley's was revived; they and their followers became known as Methodists.

== Early missionaries to America ==
In 1766, Reverend Laurence Coughlan arrived in Newfoundland and opened a school at Black Head in Conception Bay. Around the same time, two Methodist lay preachers emigrated to America and formed societies. Philip Embury, prompted by fellow Irish Methodist Barbara Heck , began preaching in New York. Soon, Captain Webb, a British Army officer, assisted him in forming a congregation that would become the first Methodist society in New York.

The oldest Methodist church in America is John Street Methodist Church in New York City, founded on October 12, 1766.

In 1770, two authorized Methodist preachers, Richard Boardman and Joseph Pilmoor, arrived from the British Connexion. They were immediately preceded by the unauthorized Robert Williams who quietly set about supporting himself by publishing American editions of Wesley's hymnbooks without obtaining permission to do so. These men were soon followed by others, including Francis Asbury, who reorganized the mid-Atlantic work in accordance with the Wesleyan model. Internal conflict characterized this period. Missionaries displaced most of the local preachers and irritated many of the leading lay members. During the American Revolution, "the mid-Atlantic work" (as Wesley called it) diminished, and, by 1778, the work was reduced to one circuit. Asbury refused to leave. He remained in Delaware during this period.

Concurrently, Robert Strawbridge began a Methodist work in Maryland. They did not work together and did not know of each other's existence. Strawbridge ordained himself and organized a circuit. He trained many very influential assistants who became some of the first leaders of American Methodism. His work grew rapidly both in numbers and in geographical spread. The British missionaries discovered Strawbridge's work and annexed it into the American connection. However, the native preachers continued to work side by side with the missionaries, and they continued to recruit and dispatch more native preachers. Southern Methodism was not dependent on missionaries in the same way as mid-Atlantic Methodism.

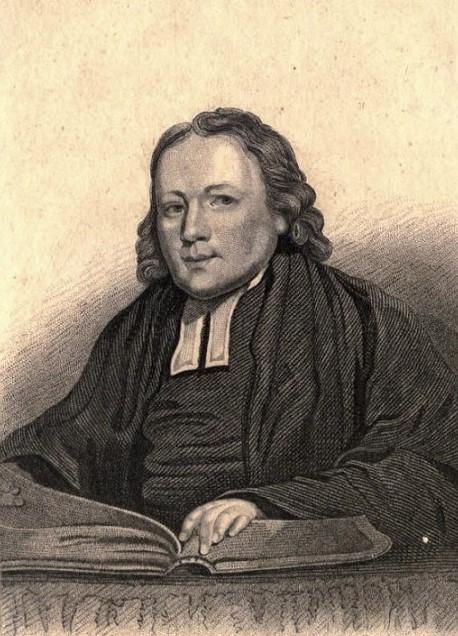
Thomas Coke, the first Methodist bishop

Up until this time, with the exception of Strawbridge, none of the missionaries or American preachers was ordained. Consequently, the Methodist people received the sacraments at the hands of ministers from established Anglican churches. Most of the Anglican priests were Loyalists who fled to England, New York or Canada during the war. In the absence of Anglican ordination, a group of native preachers ordained themselves. This caused a split between the Asbury faction and the southern preachers. Asbury mediated the crisis by convincing the southern preachers to wait for Wesley's response to the sacramental crisis. That response came in 1784.

John Wesley, the founder of Methodism, came to believe that the New Testament evidence did not leave the power of ordination to the priesthood in the hands of bishops but that other priests could do ordination. In 1784, he ordained preachers for Scotland and England and America, with power to administer the sacraments (this was a major reason for Methodism's final split from the Church of England). At that time, Wesley sent the Rev. Dr. Thomas Coke to America to form an independent American Methodist church. The native circuit riders met in late December. Coke had orders to ordain Asbury as a joint superintendent of the new church. However, Asbury turned to the assembled conference and said he would not accept it unless the preachers voted him into that office. This was done, and from that moment forward, the general superintendents received their authority from the conference. Later, Coke convinced the general conference that he and Asbury were bishops and added the title to the discipline. It caused a great deal of controversy. Wesley did not approve of 'bishops' who had not been ordained by bishops. The first annual conference of the newly organized Methodist Episcopal Church was held at Green Hill House near Louisburg, Franklin County, North Carolina, April 19, 1785. Four annual conferences of the Methodist Episcopal Church were held at the house of Green Hill and Hill was their host.

The first American Methodist bishops were Thomas Coke and Francis Asbury, whose boyhood home, Bishop Asbury Cottage, in West Bromwich, England, is now a museum. Upon the formation of the Methodist Episcopal Church in America at the Baltimore Christmas Conference in 1784, Coke (already ordained in the Church of England) ordained Asbury a deacon, elder, and bishop each on three successive days. This conference marked a significant step toward Methodism's independence from the Church of England and helped standardize its organizational structure within the United States. Circuit riders, many of whom were laymen, traveled by horseback to preach the gospel and establish churches. These itinerant preachers were central to the rapid expansion of Methodism, ensuring that nearly every rural crossroads and frontier settlement in the United States had a Methodist presence. One of the most famous circuit riders was Robert Strawbridge who lived in the vicinity of Carroll County, Maryland soon after arriving in the Colonies around 1760. Strawbridge's independent ordination and training of assistants contributed significantly to the spread of Methodism in the mid-Atlantic region and influenced the structure of circuits used by the later Methodist Episcopal Church

By the 1792 general conference of the Methodist Episcopal Church, the controversy relating to episcopal power boiled over. Ultimately, the delegates sided with Bishop Asbury. However, the Republican Methodists split off from the Methodist Episcopal Church (MEC) in 1792. Also, William Hammet (a missionary ordained by Wesley who traveled to America from Antigua with Bishop Coke), led a successful revolt against the MEC in 1791. He opposed Bishop Asbury and the episcopacy. He formed his people into the American Primitive Methodist Church (not directly connected with the British Primitive Methodist Church). Both American churches operated in the Southeast and presaged the episcopal debates of later reformers. Regardless, Asbury remained the leading bishop of early American Methodism and did not share his "appointing" authority until Bishop McKendree was elected in 1808. Coke had problems with the American preachers. His authoritarian style alienated many. Soon, he became a missionary bishop of sorts and never had much influence in America.

== First and Second Awakenings ==
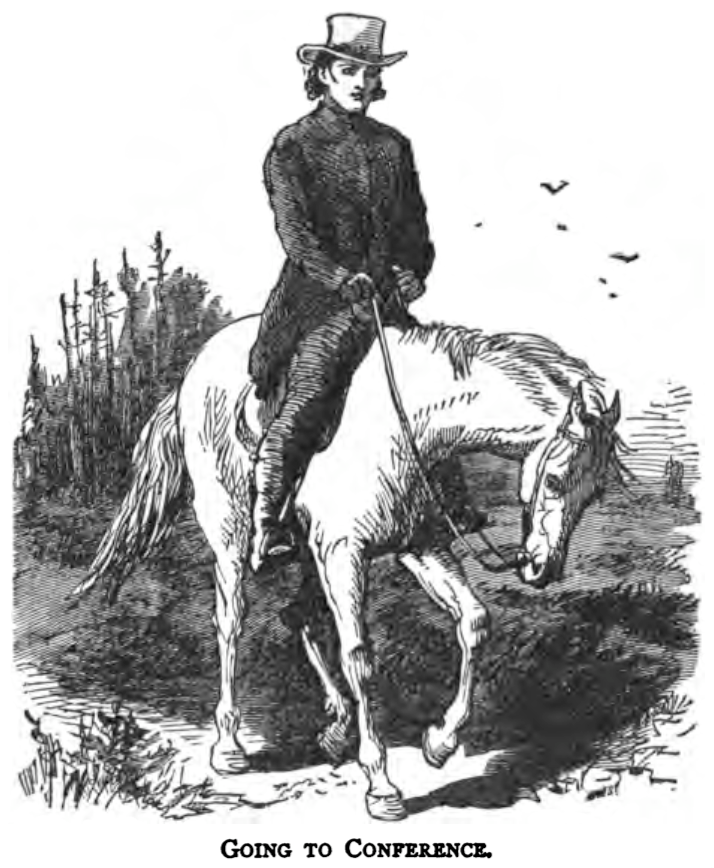
Illustration from The Circuit Rider: A Tale of the Heroic Age by Edward Eggleston depicting a Methodist circuit rider on horseback.

The First Great Awakening was a religious movement among colonials in the 1730s and 1740s. The English Calvinist Methodist preacher George Whitefield played a major role, traveling up and down the colonies and preaching in a dramatic and emotional style, accepting everyone as his audience. His itinerant preaching and theatrical delivery attracted large crowds and sparked widespread religious fervor.

The new style of sermons and the way people practiced their faith breathed new life into religion in America. People became passionately and emotionally involved in their religion, rather than passively listening to intellectual discourse in a detached manner. People began to study the Bible at home, which effectively decentralized the means of informing the public on religious matters and was akin to the individualistic trends present in Europe during the Protestant Reformation.

The revival's emphasis on personal experience and lay involvement strongly shaped John Wesley, the founder of Methodism. Wesley's spiritual awakening in 1738 during a Moravian meeting on Aldersgate Street inspired his theology of personal salvation and sanctification, which became foundational for Methodism. Many of the practices the First Great Awakening brought were later institutionalized by Methodists in America.

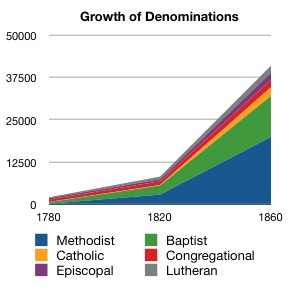
the number of local Methodist churches (blue) grew rapidly in all parts of the country; it was the largest denomination by 1820.

The Second Great Awakening was a nationwide wave of revivals, from 1790 to 1840. In New England, the renewed interest in religion inspired a wave of social activism among Yankees; Methodism grew rapidly and established several colleges, notably Boston University. Reverend David Munsey performed many revivals across the country making his home in Augusta County, Virginia from 1800 to 1856. His brother Reverend Zachariah Munsey also coordinated his efforts for the revival from his home in Montgomery County, Virginia. In the "burned over district" of western New York, the spirit of revival burned brightly. Methodism saw the emergence of a Holiness movement. In the west, especially at Cane Ridge, Kentucky and in Tennessee, the revival strengthened the Methodists and the Baptists. The Methodists appealed especially to the urban middle class. Methodism continued to expand into the Midwest - the Garrett–Evangelical Theological Seminary was founded in 1855 near Chicago by Eliza Clark Garrett in order to educate clergy for the region.

== Civil War and Reconstruction ==
Disputes over slavery placed the church in difficulty in the first half of the 19th century, with the northern church leaders fearful of a split with the South, and reluctant to take a stand. The Wesleyan Methodist Connexion (later became The Wesleyan Church) and the Free Methodist Churches were formed by staunch abolitionists, and the Free Methodists were especially active in the Underground Railroad, which helped to free the slaves. Finally, in a much larger split, in 1845 at Louisville, the churches of the slaveholding states left the Methodist Episcopal Church and formed The Methodist Episcopal Church, South. The northern and southern branches were reunited in 1939, when slavery was no longer an issue. In this merger also joined the Methodist Protestant Church. Some southerners, conservative in theology, and strongly segregationist, opposed the merger, and formed the Southern Methodist Church in 1940.

Many Northerners had only recently become religious and religion was a powerful force in their lives. No denomination was more active in supporting the Union than the Methodist Episcopal Church. Carwardine argues that for many Methodists, the victory of Lincoln in 1860 heralded the arrival of the kingdom of God in America. They were moved into action by a vision of freedom for slaves, freedom from the terror unleashed on godly abolitionists, release from the Slave Power's evil grip on the state, and a new direction for the Union. Methodists formed a major element of the popular support for the Radical Republicans with their hard line toward the white South. Dissident Methodists left the church.

The Methodist family magazine Ladies' Repository promoted Christian family activism. Its articles provided moral uplift to women and children. It portrayed the War as a great moral crusade against a decadent Southern civilization corrupted by slavery. It recommended activities that family members could perform in order to aid the Union cause.

During Reconstruction, the Methodists took the lead in helping form Methodist churches for Freedmen, and moving into Southern cities even to the point of taking control, with Army help, of buildings that had belonged to the southern branch of the church. To help the Freedmen the church set up the Freedmen's Aid Society focused on creating an educational system for former slaves. This organization, along with the church's Department of Education for Negroes of the Board of Education, helped provide education to former slaves and their children. Within three months of its organization, the Freedmen's Aid Society had begun work in the South. By the end of the first year, the society had more than fifty teachers. Over the period 1861 to 1877, at least 11,943 individual teachers who taught freed African Americans in the U.S. South, many of them under the auspices of Methodist.

The Third Great Awakening from 1858 to 1908 saw enormous growth in Methodist membership, and a proliferation of institutions such as colleges (e.g., Morningside College). Methodists were often involved in the Missionary Awakening and the Social Gospel Movement. The awakening in so many cities in 1858 started the movement, but in the North it was interrupted by the Civil War. In the South, on the other hand, the Civil War stimulated revivals, especially in Lee's army.

After the Civil War, northern Methodists made active efforts to recruit a biracial membership in the Southern states; their Freedmen's Aid Society was central to this mission, but conflicts emerged when the denomination sought to use Society funds for white schools and debated whether institutions should exclude blacks, as illustrated in the Chattanooga University controversy. A notable Methodist figure in freedmen education was Richard S. Rust, a Methodist abolitionist and educator, who co-founded the Freedmen's Aid Society and helped found or support numerous educational institutions for former slaves, including Rust College in Mississippi.

In the contested border regions during the American Civil War, Methodist ministers often assumed roles as political leaders and community organizers. In western Virginia, for instance, ministers of the Methodist Episcopal Church (MEC) actively defended western interests and cloaked them in a moral legitimacy that broadened their appeal to previously apathetic, isolated residents. Their ministry drew a fierce response from their opponents, the Methodist Episcopal Church, South (MECS). The MEC repelled these attacks and, by 1861, far outpaced the MECS in members and political influence, boasting a following larger than any political party in the region. When conservative political leaders abandoned their offices and embraced the Confederacy upon the outbreak of the Civil War, MEC itinerants filled the void in political leadership, held western Virginia in the Union, and championed its statehood.

== Modern history ==
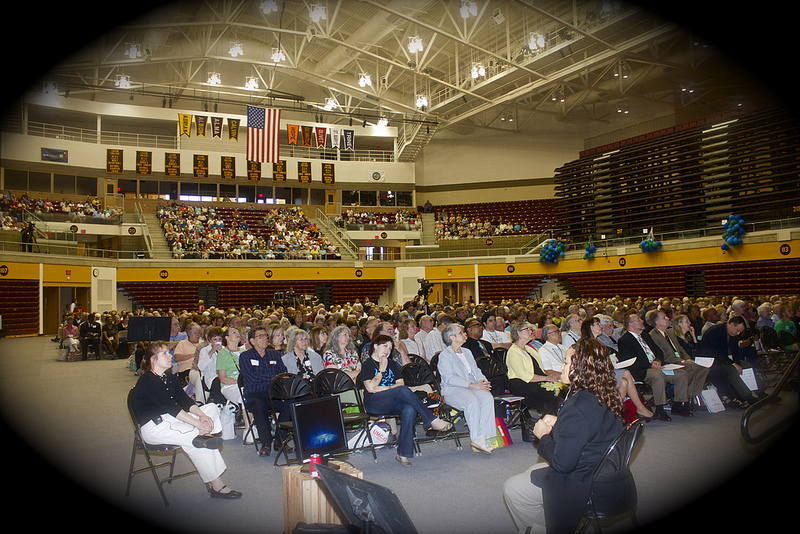
Meeting of the West Michigan Conference of The United Methodist Church.

In 1914–1917 many Methodist ministers made strong pleas for world peace. President Woodrow Wilson (a Presbyterian), promised "a war to end all wars." In the 1930s many Methodists favored isolationist policies. Methodist leaders frequently used Scripture to justify participation in the war, arguing that it was a means of defending justice and freedom. Thus in 1936, Methodist Bishop James Baker, of the San Francisco Conference, released a poll of ministers showing 56% opposed warfare. However, the Methodist Federation did call for a boycott of Japan, which had invaded China and was disrupting missionary activity there. In Chicago, sixty-two local African Methodist Episcopal churches voted their support for the Roosevelt administration's policy, while opposing any plan to send American troops overseas to fight. When war came in 1941, the vast majority of Methodists strongly supported the national war effort, but there were also a few (673) conscientious objectors. The Methodist Church had the largest number of Civilian Public Service participants of any non-pacifist denomination during World War II. These individuals served in government-approved civilian work rather than combat roles, reflecting the denomination's internal struggle between civic duty and pacifist conviction.

The United Methodist Church was formed in 1968 as a result of a merger between the Evangelical United Brethren (EUB) and The Methodist Church (USA). The former church had resulted from mergers of several groups of German Methodist heritage. There was no longer any need or desire to worship in the German language. The merged church had approximately 9 million members as of the late 1990s. While United Methodist Church in America membership has been declining, associated groups in developing countries are growing rapidly.

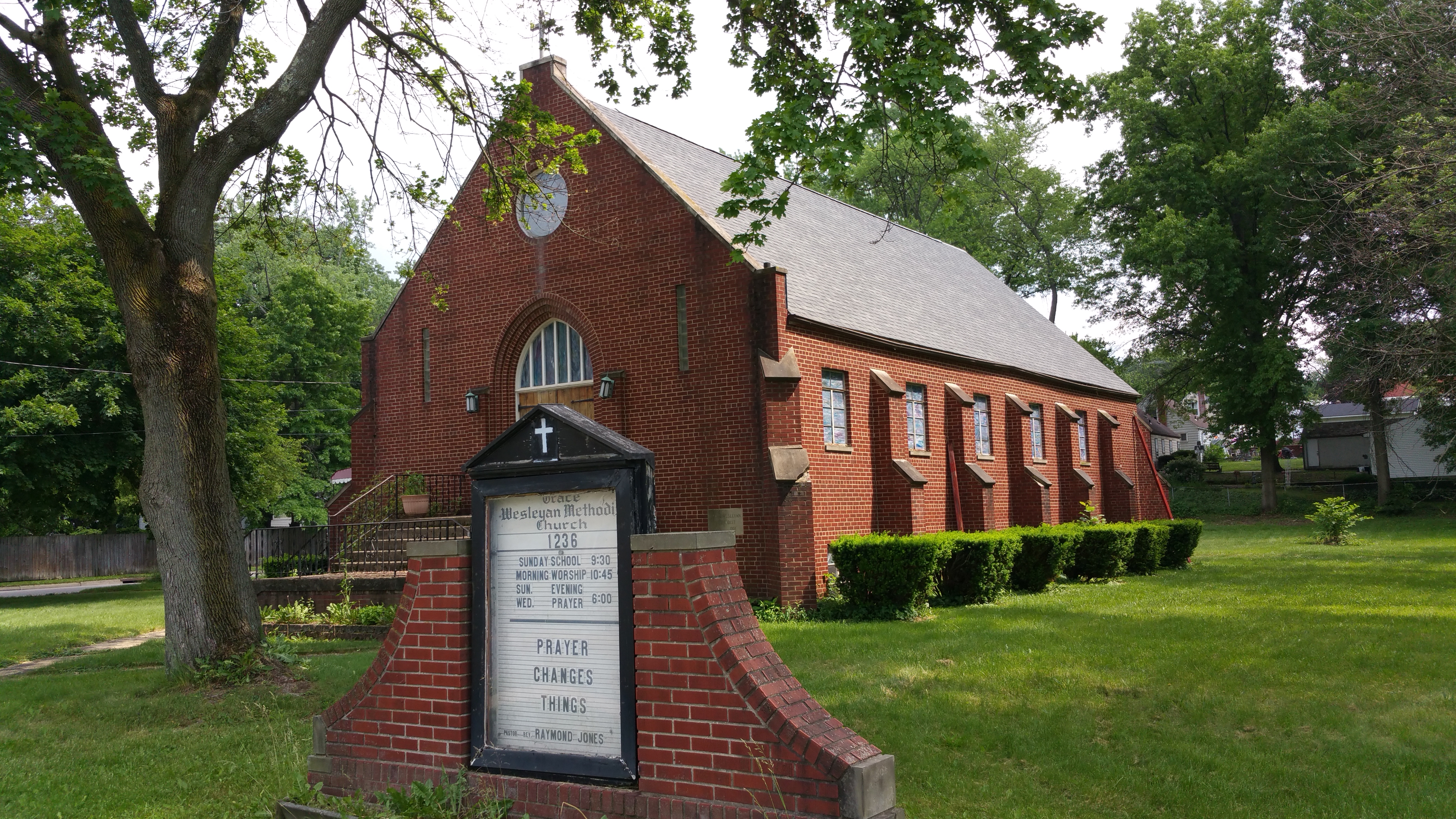
Grace Wesleyan Methodist Church is a parish church of the Allegheny Wesleyan Methodist Connection and is located in Akron, Ohio.

The holiness revival was primarily among people of Methodist persuasion, who felt that the church had once again become apathetic, losing the Wesleyan zeal. Some important events of this revival were the writings of Phoebe Palmer during the mid-19th century, the establishment of the first of many holiness camp meetings at Vineland, New Jersey in 1867, and the founding of Asbury College (1890), and other similar institutions in the US around the turn of the 20th century. The Allegheny Conference of the Wesleyan Methodist Church entered into a schism with the rest of the Wesleyan Methodist Church, a Methodist denomination in the holiness movement, because it favored a connexional polity and opposed the merger of the Wesleyan Methodist Church with the Pilgrim Holiness Church; while the rest of the Wesleyan Methodist Church became the Wesleyan Church, the Allegheny Conference of the Wesleyan Methodist Church became the Allegheny Wesleyan Methodist Connection, which today, is one of the largest denominations in the conservative holiness movement. The conservative holiness movement includes other denominations such as the Bible Methodist Connection of Churches and Evangelical Methodist Church Conference, among others.

In response to growing division in the mainline United Methodist Church, denominational leaders from across theological perspectives negotiated the Protocol of Reconciliation and Grace Through Separation in January 2020, which proposed a peaceful split allowing traditionalist congregations to depart with their property and assets. In 2022, a schism within the United Methodist Church led to many traditionalist United Methodist theologians, clergy and laity forming the Global Methodist Church after several modernist United Methodist clergy announced that they would not abide by the denomination's Book of Discipline concerning issues on human sexuality. Prior to the establishment of the Global Methodist Church, some United Methodist congregations had already left the UMC to join the Free Methodist Church and Evangelical Methodist Church, traditionalist Methodist denominations aligned with the Wesleyan-Holiness movement. Other former United Methodist congregations joined various conservative Methodist denominations, such as the Congregational Methodist Church, Methodist Protestant Church and Southern Congregational Methodist Church, or became members of the Association of Independent Methodists. Following the launch of the Global Methodist Church, thousands of congregations began disaffiliating from the UMC under Paragraph 2553 of the Book of Discipline, which allowed local churches to leave if two-thirds of their members approved and all financial obligations were met before December 31, 2023. By the end of 2023, more than 7,500 U.S. congregations, about one-quarter of all UMC churches, had voted to disaffiliate, with many joining the GMC or becoming independent Methodist bodies. The UMC Judicial Council later ruled that entire annual conferences could not collectively disaffiliate, limiting that right to individual churches.

== Methodist church structure in America ==
American Methodist churches are generally organized on a connectional model, related but not identical to that used in Britain. Pastors are assigned to congregations by bishops, distinguishing it from presbyterian government. Methodist denominations typically give lay members representation at regional and national meetings (conferences) at which the business of the church is conducted, making it different from most episcopal government (The Episcopal Church USA, however, has a representational polity giving lay members, priests, and bishops voting privileges). This connectional organizational model differs further from the congregational model, for example of Baptist, and Congregationalist Churches, among others.

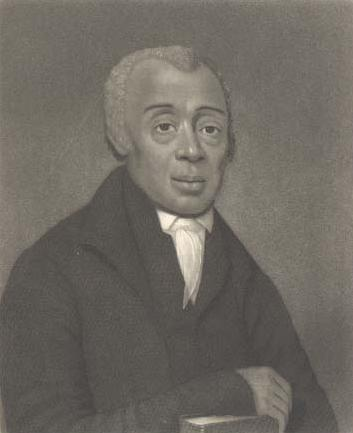
Bishop Richard Allen, the founder of the African Methodist Episcopal Church.

In addition to the United Methodist Church, there are over 40 other denominations that descend from John Wesley's Methodist movement. Some, such as the African Methodist Episcopal Church, the AME Zion Church, the Free Methodist Church, the Wesleyan Church (formerly Wesleyan Methodist Connection), the Congregational Methodist Church and First Congregational Methodist Church are explicitly Methodist. The Primitive Methodist Church is a continuing branch of the former British Primitive Methodist Church. Others do not call themselves Methodist, but are related to varying degrees. The Evangelical Church was formed by a group of EUB congregations who dissented from the merger which formed the United Methodist Church. The United Methodist Church has also taken steps to strengthen ties with its fellow Methodist churches, as well as other Protestant denominations in the United States. Since 1985, the UMC has been exploring a possible merger with three historically African-American Methodist denominations: the African Methodist Episcopal Church, the African Methodist Episcopal Zion Church, and the Christian Methodist Episcopal Church. A Commission on Pan Methodist Cooperation and Union formed in 2000 to carry out work on such a merger.

From its beginning in England, Methodism laid emphasis on social service and education. Numerous originally Methodist institutions of higher education were founded in the United States in the early half of the 19th century, and today altogether there are about twenty universities and colleges named as "Methodist" or "Wesleyan" still in existence.

Additionally, the Methodist Church has created a number of Wesley Foundation establishments on college campuses. These ministries are created to reach out to students, and often provide student housing to a few students in exchange for service to the ministry. Wesley Foundations are funded through their local annual conference, and therefore must remain UMC.

United Methodist elders and pastors may marry and have families. Elders are considered itinerant preachers, and are placed in congregations by their bishop. Elders and pastors can either ask for a new appointment or their church can request that they be re-appointed elsewhere. If the elder is a full-time pastor, the church is required to provide either a house or a housing allowance for the pastor.

Whereas most American Methodist worship is modeled after the Anglican Communion's Book of Common Prayer, a unique feature was the once practiced observance of the season of Kingdomtide, which encompasses the last thirteen weeks before Advent, thus dividing the long season after Pentecost into two discrete segments. During Kingdomtide, Methodist liturgy emphasizes charitable work and alleviating the suffering of the poor. This practice was last seen in The Book of Worship for Church and Home by The United Methodist Church, 1965, and The Book of Hymns, 1966. While some congregations and their pastors might still follow this old calendar, the Revised Common Lectionary, with its naming and numbering of Days in the Calendar of the Church Year, is used widely. However, congregations who strongly identify with their African American roots and tradition would not usually follow the Revised Common Lectionary.

Adding more complexity to the mix, there are United Methodist congregations who orient their worship to the "free" church tradition, so particular liturgies are not observed. The United Methodist Book of Worship and The Hymns of the United Methodist Church are voluntarily followed in varying degrees. Such churches employ the liturgy and rituals therein as optional resources, but their use is not mandatory.

== Social principles and participation in movements ==
From the movement's beginnings, with its roots in Wesleyan theology, Methodism has distinguished itself as a religious movement strongly tied to social issues. As father of the movement, John Wesley injected much of his own social philosophy into the movement as a whole. Wesley's personal social philosophy was characterized by "an instructive reluctance to criticize existing institutions [which] was overborne by indignation at certain abuses which cried out for rectification." The Methodist Church's responses to injustices in society are embodiments of the Wesleyan traditions of mercy and justice.

At the end of the 19th- and beginning of the 20th-centuries, the Methodist Church responded strongly to what it regarded as social ills (e.g., gambling, use of intoxicating beverages, etc.) with attention to the Methodist doctrines of sanctification and perfection through Christ. In the United States, today's United Methodist Church continues to embody Methodist traditions in their response to social needs through the General Board of Church and Society and the General Board of Global Ministries.

In the United States, the United Methodist Church is the second-largest sponsor of Boy Scout units, with 11,078 chartered units, representing over 370,000 youth members; by way of contrast, the LDS Church, which sponsors a total of 37,882 units – over three times as many – can boast a total youth membership of slightly over 420,000, only a 13.5% increase over the UMC's total.

=== Attitudes toward slavery ===
Like most other national organizations, the Methodist Church experienced tensions and rifts over the slavery dispute. Both sides of the argument used the doctrines of the movement and scriptural evidence to support their case.

The initial statement of the Methodist Episcopal Church's position on slavery was delivered in the Conference minutes from the annual conference in 1780. After a comprehensive statement of the varied reasons slavery goes against "the laws of God, man, and nature", the Conference answered in the affirmative to the question, "do we pass our disapprobation on all our friends who keep slaves and advise their freedom?" This position was put into action in 1783. Preachers from the Baltimore Conference were required, under threat of suspension, to free their slaves. By 1784, similar requirements were made of Methodists as a whole, laity and clergy alike. The negative reaction to this requirement was so strong that it had to be abandoned, but the rule was kept in the Book of Discipline.

As slavery disputes intensified in the 19th century, there emerged two doctrines within the Methodist Church. Churches in the South were primarily proslavery, while northern churches started antislavery movements. The apologia of the Southern churches was largely based in Old Testament scriptures, which often represent slavery as a part of the natural order of things. New Testament writings were sometimes used to support the case for slavery as well. Some of the writings of Paul, especially in Ephesians, instruct slaves to remain obedient to their masters. Southern ideology also argued that slavery was beneficial for slaves, as well as their owners, saying that they were offered protections from many ills because of their slavery. The antislavery movement in northern churches strengthened and solidified in response to the pro-slavery apologia of Southern churches.

The Free Methodist Church and Wesleyan Methodist Church were formed by members of the Methodist Episcopal Church who wished to take a definitive antislavery and abolitionist stance.

=== Education of young people ===
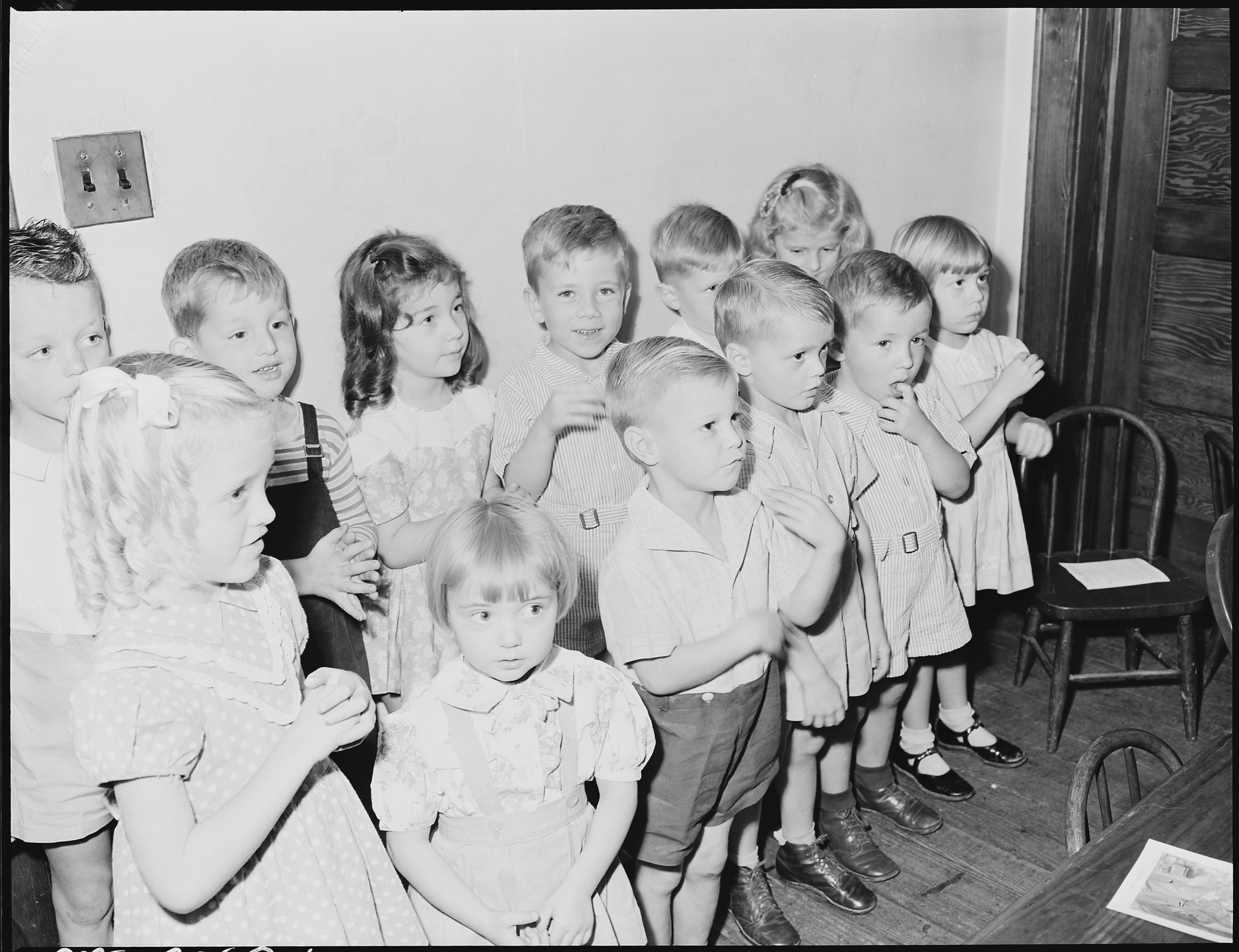
Sunday school at a Methodist church in Kentucky, 1946

The Methodist church has always been strongly oriented towards the religious lives of the young. In 1848, the General Conference stated, "when the Church has collected...a great population born within [her] bosom, she cannot fulfill her high mission unless she takes measure to prevent this population from being withdrawn from under her care in the period of its youth." The first two American bishops of the Methodist Church, Thomas Coke and Francis Asbury, opened a preparatory school in Abingdon, Maryland in 1787. The school was a strict environment, with seven hours a day devoted to study. The venture ended when a fire destroyed the building in which the school was housed.

In the 1870s, there was a broad movement toward incorporating Sunday schools into the doctrines of churches as a way to take ownership of the Christian education of children. This was the first great interdenominational movement the United States had ever seen. Methodists invested heavily in the cause of Christian education because of their emphasis on the child's right to and ability to "respond to divine influences from the beginning."

Beginning after World War II, the Methodist churches in the United States continued developing, at a much greater pace, ministries on Universities, Colleges, Junior Colleges and other higher education institutions, on campuses of both church-owned and state schools throughout the United States and Canada, and to a lesser degree in Australia, New Zealand and the United Kingdom. Methodism boasts the largest number of higher education ministries, including teaching positions, of any Protestant denomination in the world in close competition with the Southern Baptist Convention. This emphasis is, in part, a reflection of the Methodist movement's earliest roots in The Oxford Holy Club, founded by John Wesley, his brother Charles, George Whitefield and others as a response to what they saw as the pervasive permissiveness and debauchery of Oxford University, and specifically Lincoln College when they attended. It is from the Holy Club that the earliest Methodist societies were formed and spread.

Methodist Churches have long emphasized the importance of confirmation as a critical stage in the religious education of young people. In many Methodist congregations, confirmation programs span months of instruction in Wesleyan theology, church history, doctrine, and disciplines, often culminating in a worship service with the laying on of hands and vows. Because confirmation is tied to the church's investment in youth, congregations often view it as a stabilizing factor in retaining adolescents in church life, helping bridge the gap from childhood religious instruction to adult discipleship.

=== Temperance movement ===
The temperance movement was the social concern which most broadly captured the interest and enthusiasm of the Methodist Church. The movement was strongly tied to John Wesley's theology and social principles. Wesley's abhorrence of alcohol use was taken up by American Methodists, many of whom were active and prominent leaders within the movement.

The temperance movement appealed strongly to the Methodist doctrines of sanctification and Christian perfection. The Methodist presentation of sanctification includes the understanding that justification before God comes through faith. Therefore, those who believe are made new in Christ. The believer's response to this sanctification then is to uphold God's word in the world. A large part of this, especially in the late-19th century, was "to be their brother's keepers, or [...] their brother's brothers." Because of this sense of duty toward the other members of the church, many Methodists were personally temperate out of a hope that their restraint would give strength to their brothers. The Methodist stance against drinking was strongly stated in the Book of Discipline. Initially, the issue taken was limited to distilled liquors, but quickly evolved into teetotalism and Methodists were commonly known to abstain from all alcoholic beverages.

In 1880, the general conference included in the Discipline a broad statement which included, "Temperance is a Christian virtue, Scripturally enjoined." Due to the temperate stance of the church, the practice of Eucharist was altered — to this day, Methodist churches most commonly use grape juice symbolically during Communion rather than wine. The Methodist church distinguished itself from many other denominations in their beliefs about state control of alcohol. Where many other denominations, including Roman Catholics, Protestant Episcopalians, Lutherans, and Unitarians, believed that the ill-effects of liquor should be controlled by self-discipline and individual restraint, Methodists believed that it was the duty of the government to enforce restrictions on the use of alcohol. In 1904, the Board of Temperance was created by the General Conference to help push the Temperance agenda.

The women of the Methodist Church were strongly mobilized by the temperance movement. In 1879, a Methodist woman, Frances E. Willard, was voted to the presidency of the Women's Christian Temperance Union, an organization that was founded in December 1873, and was characterized by heavy Methodist participation. To this day, the Women's Division of the General Board of Global Missions holds property on Capitol Hill in Washington, DC, which was built using funds provided by laypeople. Women of the church were responsible for 70% of the $650,000 it cost to construct the building in 1922. The building was intended to serve as the Methodist Church's social reform presence of the Hill. The Board of Temperance, Prohibition and Public Morals was especially prominent within the building.

=== Varied stances on homosexuality ===
Among Methodist denominations in the United States, the majority view homosexuality as sinful, including the African Methodist Episcopal Zion Church, Allegheny Wesleyan Methodist Connection, Bible Methodist Connection of Churches, Free Methodist Church, Global Methodist Church, Holiness Methodist Church, Methodist Protestant Church, Primitive Methodist Church, and Southern Methodist Church. The United Methodist Church, on the other hand, now performs same-sex marriages and ordains LGBT individuals as clergy. The United Methodist Church delegates met in St. Louis on February 26, 2019, and voted 438 to 384 to maintain its policies defining marriage as a covenant between one man and one woman and barring "self-avowed practicing homosexuals" from serving as clergy. The plan made it easier to enforce penalties for violating the teaching, which is part of the church's Book of Discipline. However, modernist bishops in certain parts of the United Methodist Church were not enforcing the Book of Discipline. As a result, over 25% of congregations in the United States disaffiliated from the United Methodist Church in order to preserve the traditional definition of marriage and ordination. The majority of these traditionalist United Methodist Churches have joined the Global Methodist Church which was formed in May 2022, though other traditional United Methodist congregations have joined the Free Methodist Church, Congregational Methodist Church, or Association of Independent Methodists, among other Methodist denominations aligned with the holiness movement. Following the exodus of traditionalist United Methodist congregations from the denomination, in May 2024, the General Conference of The United Methodist Church convened in Charlotte, NC, and delegates voted to remove language defining homosexuality as sinful, along with restrictions on the ordination and marriage of LGBTQIA+ individuals from the Book of Discipline, the church's book of governance. Furthermore, the delegation voted on social principles that affirm the rights and sacred worth of LGBTQIA+ people.

== See also ==
- William Seward (preacher) - Early Methodist itinerant preacher and the first Methodist to be martyred
