= Church of God (Holiness) =

Association of holiness Christian congregations

- Classification: Methodist
- Orientation: Conservative holiness movement
- Theology: Wesleyan; Restorationist
- Polity: Mixed: elements of Congregationalist, Presbyterian and Episcopalian polities
- Associations: Global Wesleyan Alliance; Interchurch Holiness Convention
- Origin: 1883; Centralia, Missouri
- Branched from: Methodist Episcopal Church
- Congregations: about 120
- Official website: cogh.net

The Church of God (Holiness) is an association of autonomous holiness Christian congregations. Originating in the 19th century as an outgrowth of the Methodist Episcopal Church, it teaches Wesleyan (Methodist) doctrine and is aligned with conservative holiness movement. At its founding in 1883, the Church of God sought to actualize the New Testament church. With respect to cooperation with other Wesleyan Methodist denominations, the Church of God is a member of the Global Wesleyan Alliance and Interchurch Holiness Convention.

== History ==
The Church of God (Holiness) began on March 29, 1883, with the founding of a church in Centralia, Missouri with 44 members. Those involved in this effort were: J. F. Watkins, N. T. Sneed, H. A. Foster, G. R. Sneed, F. H. Sumter, J. B. Ceighton, J. H. Allen, D. C. Brenneman, G. W. Petty, Isaiah Reid, T. B. Bratton, A. L. Brewer, A. M. Kiergan, and W. T. Bean. The name "Church of God" was chosen as its adherents felt that this was the Scriptural name for the body; its people opposed the idea of denominationalism, holding that "all who were genuinely converted were a part of the true church" and that "each individual was accountable to a local body of believers." The movement grew out of a group of former members of the Methodist Episcopal Church that had been participating in the Southwestern Holiness Association. A cause of their departure from the Methodist Episcopal Church was their zealous propagation of the instantaneous aspect of entire sanctification, in contrast to the Methodist Episcopal Church, which taught that entire sanctification could be received either instantaneously or progressively. One of the early leaders was John Petit Brooks (1826–1915), who was editor of The Church Witness, which subsequently merged with The Good Way, to become the Church Herald, which later merged with the Church Advocate and Holiness Banner to become The Church Herald and Holiness Banner. He left the Methodist Episcopal Church circa 1886.

== Beliefs ==
The idea of church is for believers to come together as a body, and to have fellowship with other believers. God desires that we come to Him with a repentant heart and a desire to know Him more fully.

== Organization ==
The Church of God (Holiness) has about 120 congregations in the United States, with the majority in Missouri and Kansas. Additionally they have 12 congregations on the Navajo Reservation, 13 Spanish-speaking congregations in California, Texas, New York and Colorado, a Korean ministry in Overland Park, Kansas, and two Haitian works in New York and Florida. The church also has a sizeable outgrowth in the Cayman Islands. Ministry departments of the church include Home Missions, World Missions, Harmony Hill Youth Ministries, and the Herald and Banner Press. Headquarters are located in Overland Park, Kansas. A general church conference is held annually in Overland Park. World missions works are found in Bolivia, the British West Indies, the Virgin Islands, Ghana, Nigeria, India, Myanmar, Papua New Guinea, Colombia, Cuba, Haiti, Jamaica, and Ukraine.

== Ecumenism ==
With respect to ecumenism, the Church of God is a member of the Global Wesleyan Alliance and the Interchurch Holiness Convention.

== Education ==
The Church of God (Holiness) is associated with Kansas Christian College in Overland Park. This institution gives degrees in ministry, business leadership, psychology, and education. The headquarters for the church is located on the campus and the General Camp and Convention are also held here. The church is also associated with several private elementary and secondary schools. These are El Dorado Christian School in Eldorado Springs, Missouri; Fort Scott Christian Heights in Fort Scott, Kansas; Gravette Holiness Bible School in Gravette, Arkansas; Lowry City Christian School in Lowry City, Missouri; Mount Zion Bible School in Ava, Missouri; Mountain State Christian School in Culloden, West Virginia; and Overland Christian Schools in Overland Park.
