= God's Missionary Church =

- Classification: Methodist
- Orientation: Conservative Holiness
- Origin: 1935
- Merger of: Immanuel Missionary Church (Western District) [2015]
- Official website: www.godsmissionarychurch.org

God's Missionary Church is a Methodist denomination within the conservative holiness movement. It was organized in 1935 as a result of gospel tent revivals held throughout central Pennsylvania by evangelists Rev. William Straub and Rev. Daniel Dubendorf.

At its inception, God's Missionary Church adopted the Book of Discipline of the Wesleyan Methodist Church. Today, there are nearly 50 churches (most of them in Pennsylvania), as well as missions stations in other countries. The president of the denomination is Rev. Jacob Martin. God's Missionary Church also operates a training school called Penn View Bible Institute which is accredited with ABHE. Both the denomination headquarters and the school are based in Penns Creek, Pennsylvania. On July 25, 2010, the God's Missionary Church celebrated its 75th anniversary. In 2015, the Western District of the Immanuel Missionary Church merged with God's Missionary Church.

The key theological distinctives of this conservative Holiness group are represented by their stance on entire sanctification and their adherence to John Wesley's definition of sin. This group defines entire sanctification according to their manual as:

"That second, definite, instantaneous work of grace, subsequent to regeneration, wrought in the heart of the justified person through faith, by the baptism of the Holy Ghost and fire, whereby the heart of the believer is cleansed from the original sin, and purified by the filling of the Holy Ghost."

Their other theological distinctive, Wesley's concept of sin is explained by his statement:

Nothing is sin, strictly speaking, but a voluntary transgression of a known law of God. Therefore, every voluntary breach of the law of love is sin; and nothing else, if we speak properly. To strain the matter farther is only to make way for Calvinism. There may be ten thousand wandering thoughts, and forgetful intervals, without any breach of love, though not without transgressing the Adamic law. But Calvinists would fain confound these together. Let love fill your heart, and it is enough!
