= FCMC =

FCMC may refer to:

- FC Morangis-Chilly, a football club in France
- First Congregational Methodist Church, a Methodist Christian denomination in the United States
