= Global Wesleyan Alliance =

Ecumenical Wesleyan-Arminian Organization

The Global Wesleyan Alliance (GWA) is an ecumenical organization of Christian denominations who adhere to Wesleyan-Arminian (Methodist) theology. It was formed in Anderson, Indiana, in 2011.

The initial December 2–3, 2011, organisational meeting for the Global Wesleyan Alliance included the general superintendents, bishops, and general directors of the Free Methodist Church, Congregational Methodist Church, Evangelical Methodist Church, Global Methodist Church, Methodist Protestant Church, Church of the Nazarene, Wesleyan Church, Church of God (Anderson), Brethren in Christ, Churches of Christ in Christian Union, the Evangelical Church, International Fellowship of Bible Churches, Salvation Army, Church of Christ (Holiness) U.S.A., Church of God (Holiness), and the Missionary Church. Each denomination’s or movement’s governing body must ultimately approve Alliance partnership. These denominations and several others participated in the GWA’s first official assembly which met at the Churches of Christ in Christian Union's headquarters in Circleville, Ohio, on November 30–December 1, 2012.

The Alliance is designed to increase interdenominational cooperation without the necessity for formal corporate mergers, and to facilitate more sharing of resources and good practice, including the sharing of ministers.

The Covenant of the Global Wesleyan Alliance includes a Statement of Faith and a plan for the organisation and governance of the Alliance.

== See also ==
- Interchurch Holiness Convention
- Christian Holiness Partnership
- Wesleyan Holiness Connection
