= Teetotalism =

Avoidance of the consumption of alcohol

Data for 2020 showing share of over-fifteen-year-old population that reportedly have never drunk alcohol (lifetime abstention). Global average is 45%.

Data for 2020 showing share of over-fifteen-year-old population that did not consume alcohol in the preceding year.

Teetotalism is the practice of voluntarily abstaining from the consumption of alcohol. A person who practices (and possibly advocates) teetotalism is known as a teetotaler and is said to be teetotal. Globally, in 2016, 57% of adults did not drink alcohol in the past year, and 44.5% had never consumed alcohol. A number of temperance organisations have been founded to promote teetotalism and provide spaces for nondrinkers to socialise.

Teetotalism is found as an aspect of religious practice in Buddhism, Hinduism, Islam, Jainism, Sikhism, and in some forms of Christianity. Other common reasons for choosing teetotalism are psychological, health, medical, philosophical, social, political, financial, past alcoholism, or simply preference.

== Etymology ==
According to the Online Etymology Dictionary, the tee- in teetotal is the letter T, so it is actually t-total, though it was never spelled that way. The word is first recorded in 1832 in a general sense in an American source, and in 1833 in England in the context of abstinence. Since at first it was used in other contexts as an emphasised form of total, the tee- is presumably a reduplication of the first letter of total, much as contemporary idiom might say "total with a capital T".

The teetotalism movement first started in Preston, Lancashire, England, in the early 19th century. The Preston Temperance Society was founded in 1833 by Joseph Livesey, who was to become a leader of the temperance movement and the author of The Pledge: "We agree to abstain from all liquors of an intoxicating quality whether ale, porter, wine, or ardent spirits, except as medicine." Today, a number of temperance organisations exist that promote teetotalism as a virtue.

Richard Turner, a member of the Preston Temperance Society, is credited with using the existing slang word teetotally for abstinence from all intoxicating liquors. One anecdote describes a meeting of the society in 1833, at which Turner in giving a speech said, "I'll be reet down out-and-out t-t-total for ever and ever." Walter William Skeat noted that the Turner anecdote had been recorded by the temperance advocate Joseph Livesey, and posited that the term may have been inspired by the teetotum; however, James B. Greenough stated that "nobody ever thought teetotum and teetotaler were etymologically connected."

A variation on the above account is found on the pages of The Charleston Observer:

Teetotalers.—The origin of this convenient word, (as convenient almost, although not so general in its application as loafer,) is, we imagine, known but to few who use it. It originated, as we learn from the Landmark, with a man named Turner, a member of the Preston Temperance Society, who, having an impediment of speech, in addressing a meeting remarked, that partial abstinence from intoxicating liquors would not do; they must insist upon tee-tee-(stammering) tee total abstinence. Hence total abstainers have been called teetotalers.

According to the historian Daniel Walker Howe, the term was derived from the practice of the American preacher and temperance advocate Lyman Beecher. He would take names at his meetings of people who pledged alcoholic temperance and noted those who pledged total abstinence with a T. Such persons became known as Teetotallers.

== Reasons ==
A label promoting no alcohol during pregnancy

Some common reasons for choosing teetotalism are psychological, religious, health, medical, philosophical, social, political, past alcoholism, trauma, or simply preference.

== Practice ==
A number of temperance organisations have been founded to promote teetotalism and provide spaces for nondrinkers to socialise. Most teetotaller organisations also demand from their members that they do not promote or produce alcoholic intoxicants.

== Religions ==
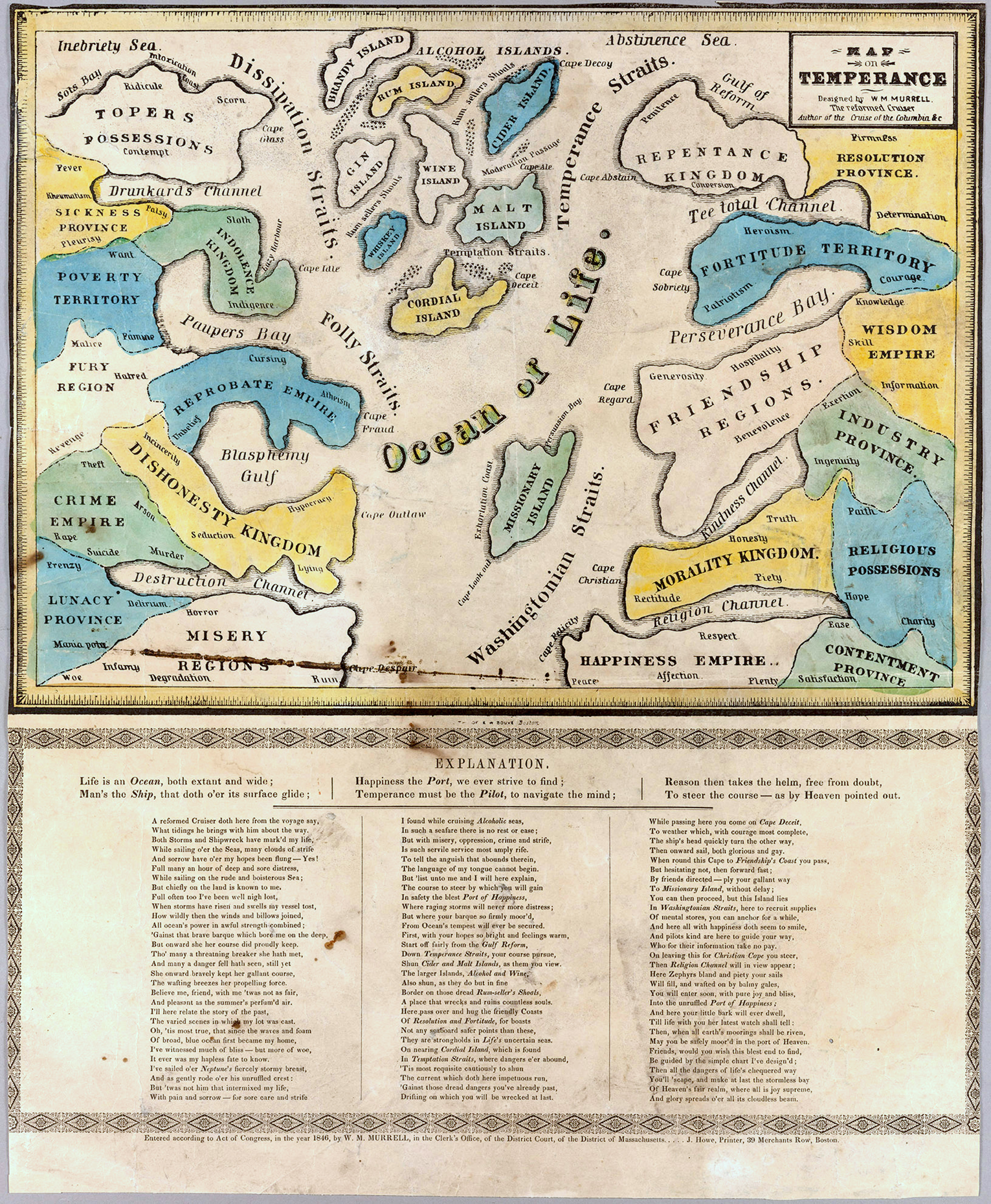
An allegorical map on temperance, accompanied by a poem. The "Religion Channel" was a strong current away from "Misery Regions" and the "Reprobate Empire", 1846.

=== Christianity ===
Some Christians choose to practice teetotalism throughout the Lent season, giving up alcoholic beverages as their Lenten sacrifice.

A number of Christian denominations forbid the consumption of alcohol, or recommend the non-consumption thereof, including certain Anabaptist denominations such as the Mennonites (both Old Order Mennonites and Conservative Mennonites), Church of the Brethren, Beachy Amish and New Order Amish. Many Christian groups, such as Methodists (especially those aligned with the Holiness movement) and Quakers (particularly the Conservative Friends and Holiness Friends), are often associated with teetotalism due to their traditionally strong support for temperance movements, as well as prohibition. The Church of Jesus Christ of Latter-day Saints, Seventh-day Adventists, and Holiness Pentecostals also preach abstinence from alcohol and other drugs.

Conservative Anabaptist denominations of Christianity proscribe the use of alcohol and other drugs. The following teaching of the Dunkard Brethren Church is reflective of Conservative Anabaptism:

Members of the Dunkard Brethren Church shall abstain from the use of intoxicating or addictive substances, such as narcotics, nicotine, marijuana, or alcoholic beverages (except as directed by a physician). Using, raising, manufacturing, buying or selling them by Christians is inconsistent with the Christian lifestyle and testimony. Members of the Dunkard Brethren Church who do so should be counseled in love and forbearance. If they manifest an unwilling or arbitrary spirit, they subject themselves to the discipline of the church, even to expulsion in extreme cases. We implore members to accept the advice and counsel of the church and abstain from all of the above. Since members are to be examples to the world (Romans 14:20–21), indulgence in any of these activities disqualifies then for Church or Sunday School work or as delegates to District or General Conference.

The temperance movement gained early support from Methodists. The British Methodist Church historically promoted teetotalism; since the 1970s, it has encouraged members to consider abstinence from alcohol, but does allow responsible drinking. The Church of the Nazarene and Wesleyan Methodist Church, both denominations in the Wesleyan tradition, teach abstinence. Members of denominations in the conservative holiness movement, such as the Allegheny Wesleyan Methodist Connection, are required to practise teetotalism. The Book of Discipline of the Immanuel Missionary Church, a conservative Methodist denomination, states:

Temperance is the moderate use of that which is beneficial, and a total abstinence from that which is harmful. Therefore no member shall be permitted to use or sell intoxicating liquors, tobacco, or harmful drugs, or to be guilty of things which are only for the gratification of the depraved appetite, and are unbecoming and inconsistent with our Christian profession (I Cor. 10:31). —General Standards, Immanuel Missionary Church

Uniformed members of the Salvation Army ("soldiers" and "officers") make a promise on joining the movement to observe lifelong abstinence from alcohol. This dates back to the early years of the organisation, and the missionary work among alcoholics.

With respect to Restorationist Christianity, members of certain groups within the Christian Science movement abstain from the consumption of alcohol.

The Church of Jesus Christ of Latter-day Saints rejects alcohol based upon the Word of Wisdom.

Eastern Orthodox Church, the Catholic Church, the Lutheran Churches, Oriental Orthodox Churches and the Anglican Communion all require wine in their central religious rite of the Eucharist (Holy Communion). In contrast, churches in the Methodist tradition (which traditionally upholds teetotalism) require that "pure, unfermented juice of the grape" be used in the sacrament of Holy Communion.

In the Gospel of Luke (1:13–15), the angel that announces the birth of John the Baptist foretells that "he shall be great in the sight of the Lord, and shall drink neither wine nor strong drink; and he shall be filled with the Holy Ghost, even from his mother's womb". A free translation of the New Testament, the Purified Translation of the Bible (2000), translates in a way that promotes teetotalism. However, the term 'wine' (and similar terms) being consumed by God's people occurs over two hundred times in both the Old and New Testament.

=== Indian religions ===
In Hinduism, the consumption of alcohol and other intoxicants, called surapana, is considered as one of the five mahapatakas (great sins). Hindus are prohibited from drinking alcohol "as it has a direct impact on the nervous system, leading to actions that a sound person normally would not."

One of the five precepts of Buddhism is abstaining from intoxicating substances that disturb the peace and self-control of the mind, but it is formulated as a training rule to be assumed voluntarily by laypeople rather than as a commandment. Jainism forbids the consumption of alcohol, in addition to trade in alcohol. Liquor is listed as one of the prohibitions in Sikhism.

=== Islam ===
In Islam, the concept of khamr (Arabic: خمر), which refers to a category of intoxicating substances that are forbidden, is now generally understood as encompassing all forms of alcohol. Muslim countries have low rates of alcohol consumption, with many enforcing a policy of prohibition. Additionally, the majority of Muslims do not drink and believe consuming alcohol is forbidden (haram).

Ibn Majah and al-Tirmidhi narrated an authentic hadith that if a Muslim drinks alcohol and does not repent, they would enter Hell after death and be "made to drink from the pus of the people of Jahannum." Muslims believe that Allah will not accept the prayers of an individual until forty days after the consumption of an alcoholic drink.

== Research on non-drinkers ==
Dominic Conroy and Richard de Visser published research in Psychology and Health that studied strategies used by college students who would like to resist peer pressure to drink alcohol in social settings. The research hinted that students are less likely to give in to peer pressure if they have strong friendships and make a decision not to drink before social interactions.

A 2015 study by the Office for National Statistics showed that young Britons were more likely to be teetotallers than their parents.

According to Global Status Report on Alcohol and Health, published by the World Health Organization in 2011, close to half of the world's adult population (45 per cent) are lifetime abstainers. The Eastern Mediterranean Region, consisting of the Muslim countries in the Middle East and North Africa, is by far the lowest alcohol-consuming region in the world, both in terms of total adult per-capita consumption and prevalence of non-drinkers, i.e., 87.8 per cent lifetime abstainers.

=== Millennials and Generation Z ===
In the United States, teetotalism has become increasingly common amongst younger generations, particularly millennials and those of Generation Z. A study published in April 2023 by the International Wine and Spirits Record (IWSR) revealed that millennials were key drivers of no-alcohol growth in the United States, with 45% of no-alcohol beer consumers in the US being millennials. By April 2024, that figure was 61%. The reasons given were primarily attributed to lifestyle and functionality.

A similar study published by the National Public Health Information Coalition in 2022 revealed that millennials and Gen Zers were more likely to embrace sobriety than drinking culture with a survey indicating that 57% of these individuals would rather go to the gym for an hour than go out to a bar, and 69% finding heavy drinking culture boring. The common reasons given for Gen Zers were maintaining control over their lives, prioritising productivity, and regulating their physical and mental health.

By 2025, that number of active drinkers plummeted to 50% among adults aged 18–34, according to Gallup data. This 22-point drop from historic highs is expected to persist through 2026, as nearly 65% of Generation Z reports an active intention to further reduce consumption or abstain entirely due to financial constraints and heightened health consciousness.

== Notable advocates ==
This is a list of notable figures who practiced teetotalism and were public advocates for temperance, teetotalism or both. To be included in this list, individuals must be well known for their abstention from alcohol, their advocacy efforts or both. Individuals whose abstention from alcohol is not a defining characteristic or feature of their notability are excluded.

- Albert Barnes – American theologian, clergyman, abolitionist, temperance advocate and author
- Hugh Bourne – English clergyman and one of the joint founders of Primitive Methodism
- George N. Briggs – 19th governor of Massachusetts, from 1844 to 1851
- Neal Dow – American Prohibition advocate and mayor of Portland, Maine, from 1851 to 1852 and from 1855 to 1856
- Stuart Hamblen – American entertainer and Prohibition Party candidate for the US presidency in the 1952 presidential election
- Lucy Webb Hayes – wife of Rutherford B. Hayes and First Lady of the United States from 1877 to 1881
- Tom Holland – British actor in films such as Spider-Man: Homecoming, Spider-Man: Far From Home and Spider-Man: No Way Home. He launched the low-alcohol beer company BERO.
- Ian MacKaye – American punk rock musician, whose work with the band Minor Threat influenced the creation of the straight edge subculture.
- Carrie Nation – American who was a radical member of the temperance movement, which opposed alcohol before the advent of Prohibition. Nation is noted for attacking alcohol-serving establishments (most often taverns) with a hatchet.
- Arnold Nordmeyer – 6th leader of the New Zealand Labour Party between 1963 and 1965.
- Robert Rutkowski – Polish psychologist, psychotherapist and author known for his advocacy of sobriety and education on addiction issues.
- Donald Trump – American 45th and 47th president who has abstained from alcohol throughout his life due to his older brother’s history of alcohol abuse. Trump has often publicly shared this family history as a personal warning against addiction and substance abuse.
- Angus Young – founding member of AC/DC has been teetotal his whole life.

== See also ==
- Blue ribbon badge – Symbol of the temperance movement
- Straight edge
