= Thomas Webb (Methodist) =

English Methodist Pioneer (1724-1796)

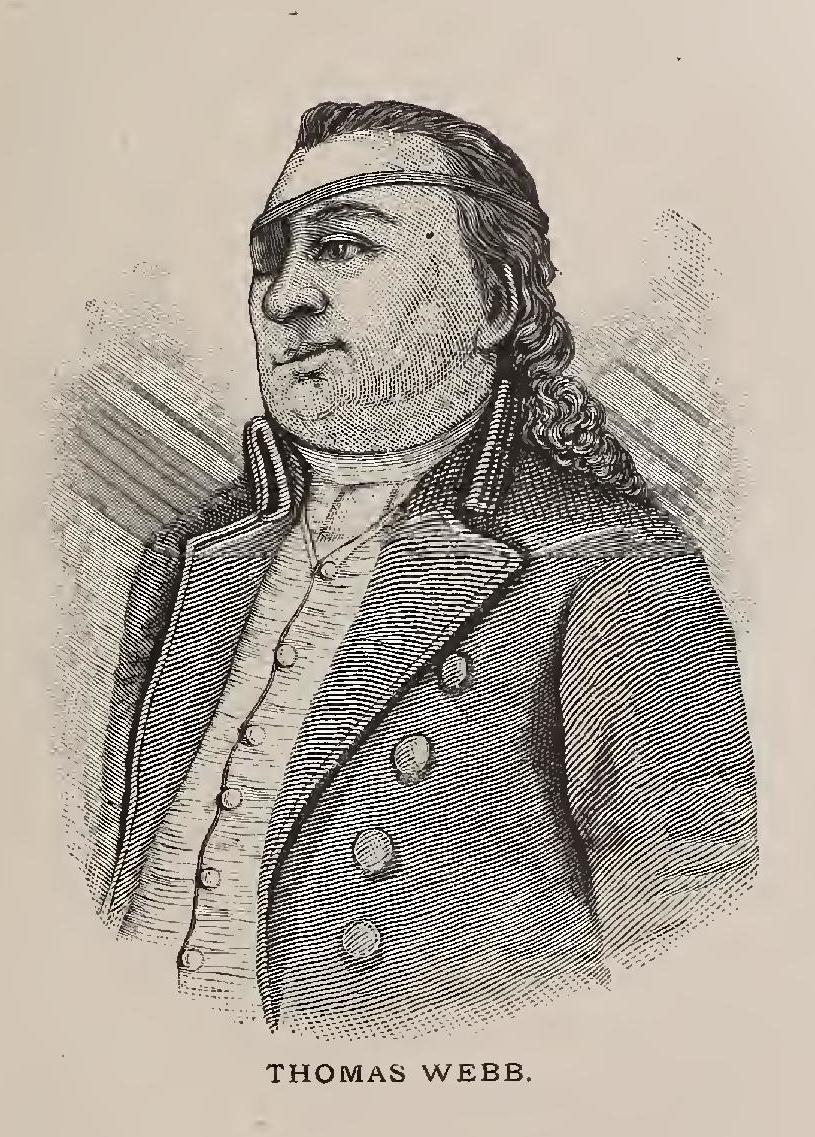
- Born: 1724
- Died: 20 December 1796 (aged 71–72)
- Occupation: Evangelist, soldier

Thomas Webb (born England, 1724; died Bristol, 20 December 1796) was a Methodist pioneer.

Webb was a British officer, served in the royal American army, and was wounded at Louisburg and Quebec. He was converted to Methodism in 1765 by the preaching of John Wesley at Bristol, England, united with a Methodist society, was licensed to preach, and gave freely of his means to found societies, attending conferences, and preaching frequently with great fervor.

Being ordered again to the United States, he was stationed at first at Albany, New York, as barrack master, and there conducted religious services in his house. When Barbara Heck established a society in New York City, he went thither, making his first appearance in the congregation about February 1767. He preached in alternation with Philip Embury, always wearing his regimental uniform, with his sword on the pulpit before him. He was the most active worker and the largest contributor for the erection of a meeting house.

On being placed on the retired list, with the rank of captain, he thenceforth travelled much as a missionary, preaching in Trenton, Burlington, and other New Jersey towns, where he founded societies, and holding regular services in Jamaica, New York, which was his home. He began to visit Philadelphia as early as 1767, and there founded the first Methodist society, to which he ministered until the arrival of Wesley's itinerants in 1769. In that year he introduced Methodism into Delaware, preaching in Newcastle and Wilmington, and later he labored in Baltimore, Maryland.

In 1772 he went to England, preached in Dublin, London, and other places, made appeals for missionaries and pecuniary aid at the conference in Leeds and elsewhere, and returned in the following year with two of the preachers that were sent in response to his solicitations. Repeating his visit, he gained other recruits for the itinerancy. Returning to England at the beginning of the Revolution, he spent the remainder of his life at Bristol, preaching there and in the neighbourhood, visiting Winchester during the war, where he preached to the French prisoners in their own language, and addressing large congregations of soldiers and sailors at Portsmouth.
