= Wesley College (Mississippi) =

Coordinates: 32.156206°N 90.114577°W

- Wesley College logo
- Type: Private Bible college, Co-ed
- Established: 1944 – Dallas, Texas; 1972 – Moved to Florence, Mississippi
- Accreditation: The Association for Biblical Higher Education, Mississippi Commission on College Accreditation
- Affiliations: Congregational Methodist Church
- President: Patsy Gilmore
- Location: Florence, Mississippi, USA
- Campus: Rural 40 acres
- Nickname: Warriors
- Sporting affiliations: National Christian College Athletic Association
- Website: www.wesleycollege.edu (archived at Internet Archive)

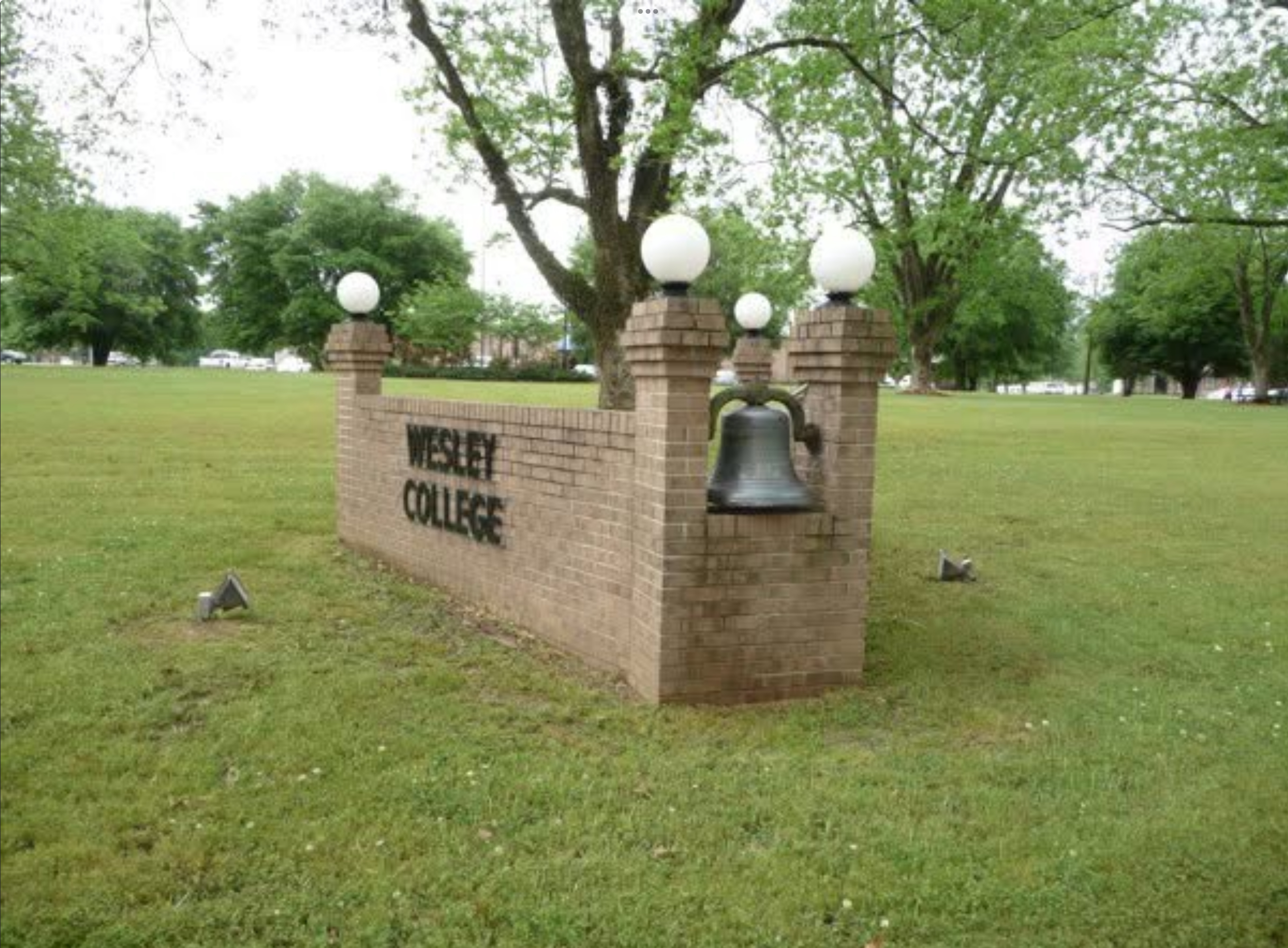

Wesley College was a private co-educational Bible college in Florence, Mississippi. Founded in 1944, it closed in July 2010.

Wesley was a conservative Bible college in the Wesleyan-Arminian tradition. Wesley was founded by the Congregational Methodist Church and served as that denomination's sole institution of higher education. Wesley offered programs of study in three academic divisions leading to Bachelor's degrees, and program certificates. Academic programs available at Wesley included bachelor's programs in Biblical Literature, Christian Education, Missions, Pastoral Ministries, Christian Counseling, and certificate programs in General Education, and Ministerial Studies.

== History ==
In 1905, the Congregational Methodist Church founded its first college, "Atlanta Bible College."

In 1912, financial difficulties and internal problems forced the closing of ABC.

In 1944 the college was reborn as "Dallas Bible School," with Otho Jennings named the first superintendent. In August of the same year, W.E. Bruce was tabbed to replace Jennings, and would hold the position until 1953.

In 1953 the Congregational Methodist Church acquired Westminster College in Tehuacana, Texas from the Methodist Protestant Church and relocated DBS there, adopting the Westminster name.

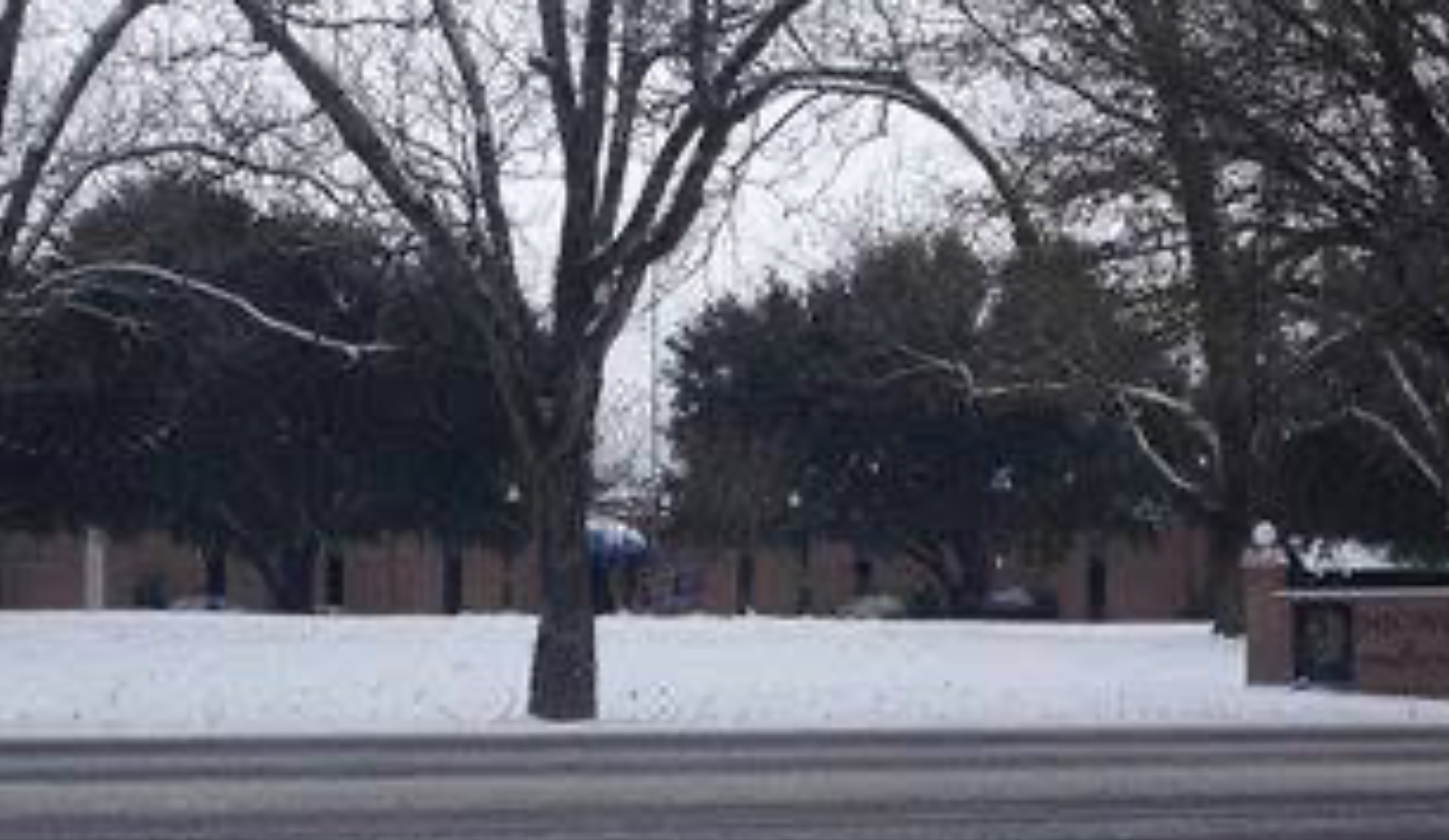

In 1972, property was acquired in Florence, Mississippi and the college was relocated to newly constructed facilities. In 1976 the name was changed from Westminster to Wesley College, a name more in keeping with the College's Wesleyan/Arminian Tradition. The school closed in July 2010.

== Campus ==
Wesley had a campus of approximately 40 acres (160,000 m^{2}). There were five buildings, including the main academic building, men's and women's dormitories, the gymnasium (home to the Wesley Warriors of the NCCAA), and the College library, which was housed in the Congregational Methodist Headquarters building.

The center of the campus was marked by a quadrangle featuring a large gazebo where students were routinely seen studying or lounging.

== Athletics ==
Wesley's athletic teams were known as the Wesley Warriors.

The school fielded a men's basketball team and a women's volleyball team in the National Christian College Athletic Association (NCCAA)'s Division II South Region where they took a national title in 1990 and were ranked number 1 going into the 2006–2007 season. During the 2006–2007 season the Warriors were led by All-American sophomore guard Dexter Morris.

== Purpose ==
Wesley College was established and operated as an instrument to equip ministers, missionaries, and lay leaders for Christian service. Her students have gone forth to successful lives and careers, building on foundations established at Wesley College. Alumni are found in many walks of life. The Wesley College impact is nationally and internationally reaching.
