= Global Methodist Church =

Protestant Wesleyan Christian denomination

- Abbreviation: GM Church
- Classification: Protestant
- Orientation: Methodist
- Scripture: Protestant Bible
- Theology: Wesleyan
- Governance: Connectionalism (modified episcopal polity)
- Connectional operations officer: The Rev. Mike Schafer
- Origin: May 1, 2022
- Separated from: United Methodist Church (2022)
- Congregations: 7,000 (self-reported)
- Ministers: 4,504
- Official website: globalmethodist.org

The Global Methodist Church (GM Church, or GMC) is a Wesleyan Methodist denomination within Protestant Christianity subscribing to views that were propounded by the conservative Confessing Movement. The denomination is headquartered in the United States and has a presence internationally. The Global Methodist Church was created as a result of a split with the United Methodist Church, after members departed to create a denomination seeking to uphold "theological and ethical Christian orthodoxy."

Congregations that left the UMC to form the Global Methodist Church opposed recognition of same-sex marriage and the ordination of non-celibate gay clergy. Its doctrines, which are aligned with Wesleyan-Arminian theology, are contained in the Transitional Book of Doctrines and Discipline, its Book of Discipline, and in The Catechism of the Global Methodist Church. The church allows both women and men to serve as clergy. As of February 2026, the church is composed of 7,000 congregations and at least 4,500 pastors.

== History ==
In the United Methodist Church, polarization started to occur between traditionalist Methodist theologians and clerics and those with progressive tendencies. Traditionalist caucuses within the United Methodist Church, such as the Confessing Movement within the United Methodist Church, Good News, Concerned Methodists, Transforming Congregations, UM Action, Lifewatch, and the Institute on Religion and Democracy for a number of years, promoted what they saw as historic Methodist positions in various General Conferences, Annual Conferences, districts, and local churches. The United Methodist Church, spurred by its global growth, was moving "in a more traditionalist and orthodox direction" as a whole. Every General Conference of the United Methodist Church since 1972 continued to uphold a traditionalist stance on human sexuality and in the United Methodist 2016 General Conference, the Church adopted more pro-life stances with respect to abortion.

In 2016, at the United Methodist Church's General Conference in Portland, Oregon, delegates voted 428 to 405 to delay conversation on homosexuality and proposed a review of ecclesiastical restrictions, with the Book of Discipline's injunctions remaining in effect, that "homosexuality is incompatible with Christian teaching" and that "marriage is only between a man and a woman." Despite the UMC prohibiting the ordination of "'self-avowed practicing' gay clergy" in its Book of Discipline, one Filipino and more than a hundred progressive American clergy in attendance at the General Conference came out as gay.

Two major plans regarding the UMC's position on homosexuality were suggested at the 2019 General Conference in St. Louis, Missouri: the Traditional Plan, which supported the denomination's current stance against same-sex marriage, and the One Church Plan, which called for the loosening of restrictions. Supporters of the Traditional Plan (who were aligned with the traditionalist caucuses), citing the Book of Discipline, succeeded in passing their proposal with a delegate vote of 438 to 384. Prior to the April vote, discussion of a possible split over gay issues had grown following a February special session that recommended the Traditional Plan. In late 2020, two progressively-aligned UMC-originating groups announced their establishment: Liberation Methodist Connexion and The Liberation Project.

Despite the passing of the Traditional Plan in the 2019 General Conference of the United Methodist Church, several modernist United Methodist clergy announced a refusal to adhere to it and the United Methodist Book of Discipline. As a result, the traditionalist caucuses began to plan the formal erection of a new traditionalist Methodist denomination, the Global Methodist Church. The denomination's name was chosen in the spirit of a quote from the father of Methodism, John Wesley, who stated with regard to evangelism, that "The world is my parish."

Due to the COVID-19 pandemic, plans to discuss and formalize the schism, inclusive of the creation of the Global Methodist Church, were delayed until 2022. In August and September of that year, the UMC General Conference was expected to vote on the proposal referred to as the "Protocol of Reconciliation and Grace Through Separation". However, Reverend Keith Boyette, chairman of the Transitional Leadership Council of the Global Methodist Church, published a letter in January 2022 that expressed concern this General Conference would also be delayed. In February 2022, the UMC announced that it was examining again postponing the General Conference. Not wanting to wait for the General Conference to occur, some conservative United Methodist congregations left the United Methodist Church to become a part of the Free Methodist Church.

The denomination launched on May 1, 2022. On 6-7 May 2022, leaders and delegates of the Wesleyan Covenant Association met in Avon, Indiana. They selected Jay Therrell of Florida as their leader, replacing Keith Boyette of Virginia, who will remain in as a member of the GMC's leadership. Also, they approved core beliefs and policies for the denomination. In September, a group of UMC bishops in Africa suspended cooperation with the Africa Initiative and Wesleyan Covenant Association after accusing the groups of working "to destroy our United Methodist Church" and attempting to raise the Global Methodist Church's profile. By July 2023, the Global Methodist Church reported 3,000 churches had joined the denomination.

In September 2024, the GMC held its convening general conference in San José, Costa Rica. The nearly 1,000 delegates overwhelmingly ratified a new constitution and elected a set of bishops for the transitional period until the next general conference in 2026, at which point the denomination will begin holding general conferences every six years.

From 2024 to 2025, violence occurred in Nigeria between United Methodists and Global Methodists. 3 United Methodists were killed, and several buildings were damaged.

In October 2025, the Global Methodist Church reported that there were now 6,000 congregations within the denomination. Many of these were from the 7,673 (as of December 2023) that had disaffiliated from the UMC, but many were also church plants, or others moving from other denominations. By February 2026, this number had increased to over 7,000 congregations.

== Beliefs ==
The doctrines of the Global Methodist Church, which are aligned with Wesleyan-Arminian theology, are contained in its Book of Discipline and in The Catechism of the Global Methodist Church.

The Global Methodist Church includes some of those aligned with the holiness movement.

== Structure ==
=== Leadership ===
Much like both the UMC and Free Methodist Church (FMC), the GMC will have an episcopacy that will oversee annual conferences. Unlike the UMC, bishops within the GMC will be consecrated to serve for a set term, as opposed to a lifetime role. The role within the UMC of district superintendent will be replaced with that of a presiding elder.

At its September 2024 convening general conference in Costa Rica, the GMC approved a constitution in which bishops function as "general superintendents," working collectively to guard the doctrine and practice of the whole church instead of being assigned to oversee individual conferences. At each future general conference, scheduled to take place every six years, the GMC's episcopal areas (groups of six to eight annual conferences) will nominate from their areas candidates to serve as bishops for the next six-year period. Following election to a six-year term, bishops are eligible to be elected to one additional term. The convening general conference also elected and consecrated six bishops to serve the church in the intervening period before the next general conference in 2026. The newly appointed bishops—Kimba Everiste of the Democratic Republic of the Congo; John Pena Auta of Nigeria; and Leah Hidde-Gregory, Kenneth Levingston, Carolyn Moore, and Jeff Greenway of the United States—joining former United Methodist bishops Scott J. Jones and Mark Webb of the United States and Johnwesley Yohanna of Nigeria in the general superintendency of the GMC. The church also selected Mike Schafer of Texas as its first connectional operations officer, the lead staff member for the denomination, succeeding Keith Boyette, who retired after holding the role on a transitional basis.

=== Annual conferences ===
In May 2022, the Judicial Council of the United Methodist Church ruled that none of the 51 annual conferences in the United States can leave the church for the GMC and that only individual churches can do so. However, the ruling does not apply to conferences outside the United States. The Romania-Bulgaria Conference had already voted to leave the UMC, and in June the Evangelical Methodist Church in Zagreb, Croatia, joined as a member congregation of the GMC. Four United Methodist conferences in Nigeria voted to leave and were received into the GMC in July 2024. In 2025, the GMC received four annual conferences spanning Belarus, Russia and Central Asia, as well as their bishop Eduard Khegay, following their separation from the UMC.

Annual conferences on the Global Methodist Church as of August 2025 are:

United States

- Alabama Emerald Coast Annual Conference (Alabama and the Florida Panhandle)
- Allegheny West Annual Conference (Ohio and western Pennsylvania)
- Florida Annual Conference (Florida east of the Panhandle)
- Great Lakes Annual Conference (Illinois, Indiana, Michigan, Wisconsin)
- Heartland Annual Conference (Colorado, Kansas, Missouri, Oklahoma)
- Korean American Annual Conference
- MidSouth Annual Conference (Kentucky, middle and east Tennessee, West Virginia and the Virginia Panhandle)
- Mid Texas Annual Conference
- Mississippi–West Tennessee Annual Conference
- North Alabama Annual Conference
- North Carolina Annual Conference
- North Georgia Annual Conference
- Northeast Annual Conference (Delaware, Maryland, New England, New Jersey, New York and eastern Pennsylvania)
- South Carolina Annual Conference
- South Georgia Annual Conference
- Trinity Annual Conference (Arkansas, Louisiana, East Texas)
- Upper Midwest Annual Conference (Iowa, Minnesota, Montana, Nebraska, North Dakota, South Dakota and Wyoming)
- Virginia Annual Conference
- West Plains Provisional Annual Conference (New Mexico, Oklahoma Panhandle and West Texas)
- Western States Provisional Annual Conference (Alaska, Arizona, California, Idaho, Hawaii, Nevada, Oregon, Utah, Washington)

Nigeria

- Central Nigeria Annual Conference
- Northeast Nigeria Annual Conference
- Northern Nigeria Annual Conference
- Southern Nigeria Annual Conference

Philippines

- Covenant Philippines Annual Conference
- Mega Manila Annual Conference

Russia and Belarus

- Central Russia Annual Conference
- East Russia Annual Conference
- Northwest Russia and Belarus Annual Conference
- South Russia Annual Conference

Other countries

- Bulgaria Annual Conference
- Central African Republic Annual Conference
- Central Asia Annual Conference
- Central Europe Annual Conference (Slovakia)
- Democratic Republic of Congo Annual Conference
- Grain Coast Annual Conference
- Kenya–Ethiopia Annual Conference
- Panama Annual Conference
- South Africa Annual Conference
- Spain Annual Conference
- Tanzania Annual Conference
- Thailand Annual Conference
- Uganda Annual Conference
- Western Europe Annual Conference
- Zambia Annual Conference

As of 2025, the GMC is also active in setting up conferences and mission activity in Angola, Bangladesh, Egypt, Ethiopia, India, Malawi, Mexico, Mozambique, Nepal, Pakistan, Peru, Rwanda, Senegal, South Sudan, Sri Lanka, Sudan and Zimbabwe.

== Partnerships ==
The Global Methodist Church cooperates with Wesleyan-Holiness denominations directly and through organizations. The Global Methodist Church is a member of the Global Wesleyan Alliance. The Global Methodist Church is a partner of the Wesleyan Holiness Women Clergy group.

The Global Methodist Church has partnered with the Christian human rights NGO Open Doors in order to provide aid to persecuted Christians.

== See also ==
- Wesleyan-holiness movement
- Congregational Methodist Church
- Global Wesleyan Alliance
- World Gospel Mission
