= Penn View Bible Institute =

Christian College in Pennsylvania

Coordinates: 40.864°N 77.061°W

Penn View Bible Institute is a nationally accredited 4 year Bible College with the Association for Biblical Higher Education preparing preachers, missionaries, Christian school teachers, child evangelism workers, and musicians in the conservative holiness movement since its beginning in 1966; the main campus also has a KG through 12th grade Christian Academy. It is located on 60 acres in rural Penns Creek in the central part of the U.S. state of Pennsylvania. It is governed by God's Missionary Church and is affiliated with the Interchurch Holiness Convention. Penn View Bible Institute is Wesleyan-Arminian (Methodist) in belief.

== History ==
During the God's Missionary Church conference of 1965, after nearly fifteen years of praying and planning, the possibility of beginning a bible school was brought to the conference floor. The ministers and delegates were told that an adjoining 16-acre (65,000 m^{2}) plot of ground, owned by Clair Knapp, was available. They went to the hill that day, August 5, 1965, and joined together in a season of prayer. By faith, they claimed the ground for God's work and a school. The General Board was authorized to buy the land.

The Penn View ground-breaking was held on July 31, 1966. General Superintendent George I. Straub presided over the ceremony. Rev. Aurthur Thomas, a minister attending the groundbreaking took a Polaroid picture of Rev. Truman Wise reading the scriptures. Rev. S.D. Herron, founder of Hobe Sound Bible College, and evangelist at Penns Creek Camp that year raised the initial $25,000 that afternoon. The first day of classes was September 6, 1966. The academy was the first to open with 52 students enrolled. Rev. Edwin Mayes served as principal.

1967 brought several changes in both the organization and its supporting infrastructure. The school expanded beyond a Christian academy, with the Institute being opened. Rev. George W. Stepp was elected as the first President of the school. Rev. & Mrs. David Fuller joined the faculty, with Rev. Fuller becoming the second Principal. Enrollment more than doubled to 132 in the Academy, and the Institute enrollment totaled 15 students. The class of 1968 was the first to graduate from Penn View Christian Academy with a total of 6 students graduating.

Rev. Howard Frey followed Rev. Stepp as the second President of Penn View. He passionately pursued the development of a library. Rev. Frey served as President from 1969-1672.

Rev. Arthur Thomas served as the third President of Penn View. He held the position of President from 1972-1979. During his presidency, Rev. Earl Deetz, Jr., was appointed Executive Vice President.

From 1979-1984, Rev. Kenneth Walter served as the fourth president of Penn View. During this term, the Hallam Building and the Miller Dining Center were built. After Five years of service, Rev. Walter believed he had completed his task at Penn View and resigned.

Rev. Gary Spriggs served as the fifth President of Penn View Bible Institute and Christian Academy. He oversaw the renovation of the Tabernacle prayer room annex into the Cooley Memorial Prayer and Music Studio. Rev. Spriggs also revitalized the debt-reduction program, enabling the school to significantly decrease its overall indebtedness.

The sixth President of Penn View was Rev. Paul Martin. In 1990, Rev. Martin moved to York, PA to pastor.

Rev. John W. Zechaman succeeded Paul Martin, becoming the first alumnus to serve as president. During his tenure numerous changes were made.

In the spring of 1997, construction of a new dormitory began. It was dedicated in the summer of 2000 and named "Zechman Hall". The area around Zechman Hall, the Miller Dining Center, and all through the lower campus was developed into parking lots and then paved, providing sufficient parking for the dormitory students as well as hundreds of visitors who come to the campus for various activities.

During President Zechman's tenure, another new construction began on lower campus. This building was named The Mason-McIntire Student Life Center and now provides additional classroom space as well as an indoor gymnasium.

Also, under President Zechman's leadership, Penn View Bible Institute began the process of accreditation. Approval for Candidate Status with the Association of Biblical Higher Education was achieved in 2014.

Rev. Zechman retired at the end of the 2017-2018 school year and was honored with the title President Emeritus.

In the spring of 2017, Rev. Daniel P. Durkee was named as the incoming president, and he assumed the office at the end of the 2017-2018 school year. Rev. Durkee is a 1993 Ministerial graduate and the former Director of Public Relations.

== Inerrancy ==
Penn View Bible Institute states that "The authoritative Word of God, the inerrant Bible, provides the foundation for all studies at Penn View" and that it "recognizes that all knowledge (absolute and objective truth) comes from God, and all knowledge points to God."

== Programs ==
Penn View Bible Institute specializes in full-time ministry training and offers one one-year Certificate and ten four-year Advanced Diplomas. General areas of study include Ministerial Studies, Biblical Studies, General Missionary, Missionary Nursing, Hispanic Studies, Muslim Ministry, Music Education & Ministry, Christian Education, and Child Evangelism.
