= Barbara Heck =

Early American Methodist, "Mother of American Methodism" (1734 - 1804)

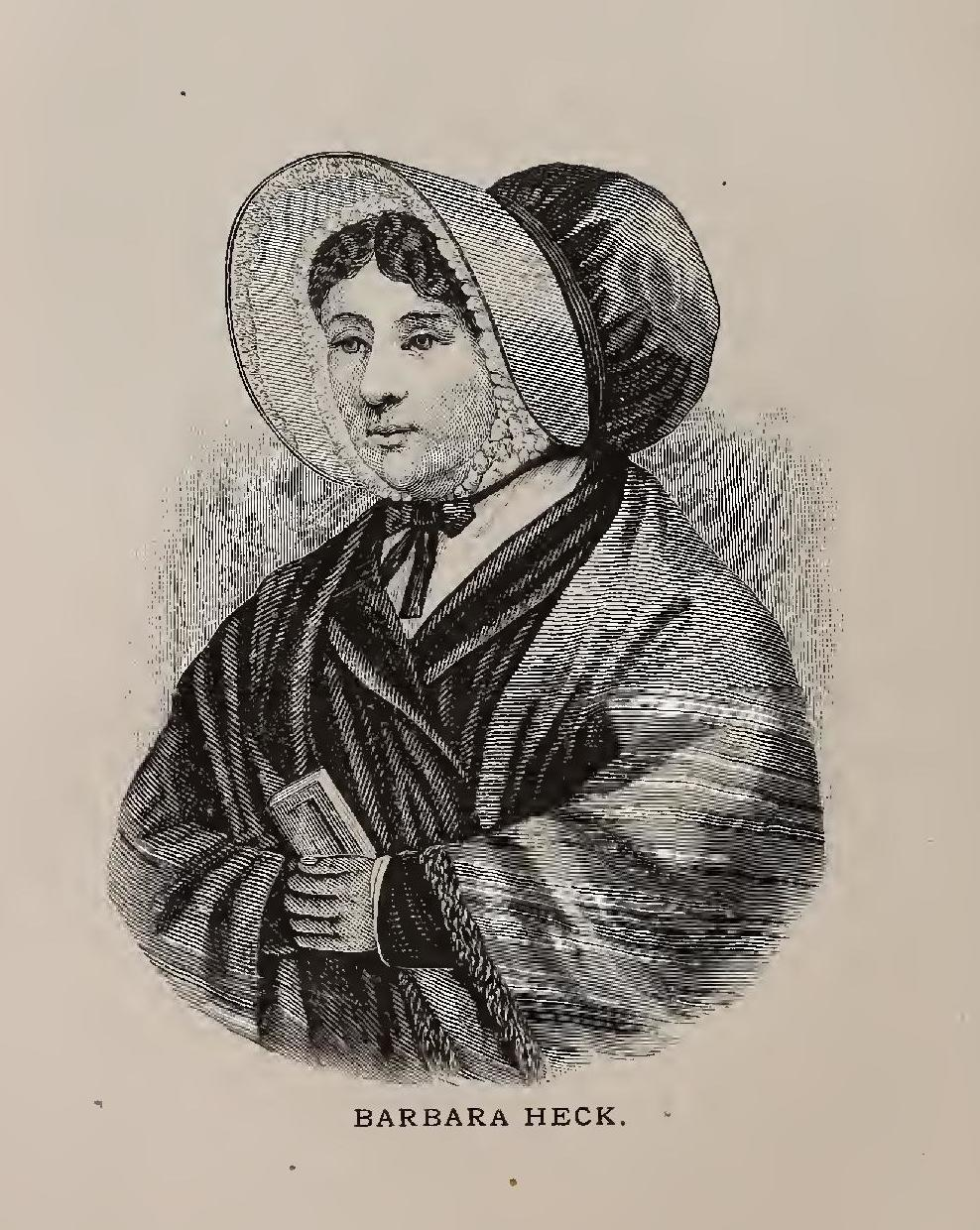
- Born: 1734
- Died: 17 August 1804 (aged 69–70)
- Resting place: Blue Church Cemetery
- Occupation: Physicist

Barbara Heck (1734, Ballingrane, County Limerick, Ireland – 17 August 1804, Augusta, Ontario) was an early American Methodist, known as the "mother of American Methodism."

== Biography ==
Heck was a member of a colony of Germans who came from the Rhine Palatinate and settled in Ballingrane, County Limerick and other parts of the west County Limerick about 1708. She married Paul Heck, a member of the same community. By the preaching of John Wesley many of these Germans, whose descendants were later known as Palatines in Ireland, became converts to Methodism.

The Hecks emigrated from Ireland in about 1760, and settled in New York, where other Methodists from Ireland became domiciled about the same time. They had no pastor and grew careless of religious observances. In 1765, they were joined by Philip Embury, who had been a local preacher in Ireland, and another group of immigrants from Ireland which included her brother Paul Ruckle. Soon after their arrival, Mrs. Heck entered a room in which, according to some accounts, Embury was present, and found the emigrants gambling at cards. She seized the cards and threw them into the fire, expostulated with the players in pathetic language, and then went to Embury and charged him that he should preach to them, or God would require their blood at his hands.

Heck gathered a group together to hear Embury shortly afterward in October 1766, making this Methodist society, which became the current John Street United Methodist Church, the oldest extant Methodist society in the Americas. The first congregation which gathered to hear the sermon preached by Philip Embury in the parlor of his home on Barrack Street (now Park Place) included Embury's wife, Paul Heck, Barbara Heck, Mr. John Lawrence, and an African American servant named Betty. Eventually, the revival included a large number, of mostly Irish immigrants and a number of African Americans. The Methodist society quickly outgrew Embury's home, moving first to a hired upper room on Barrack Street and then to a rigging loft on Horse and Cart Street (now William Street) in 1767. On March 29, 1768, they leased land on John Street and built their first permanent structure, known as Wesley Chapel, where the current John Street United Methodist Church now stands. As a structure, it post-dated another built elsewhere by Robert Strawbridge, also an early Methodist.

In 1770, the Hecks went to Camden Valley. When the Revolutionary war began, the Hecks moved to Salem, in northern New York, in order to be among loyalists, and founded the first Methodist society in that district. Paul joined the army of Burgoyne, and, while at home on a furlough at the time of the surrender at Saratoga, was arrested by patriot soldiers, but escaped at night while they slept, and made his way through the woods into Canada, where he was joined by his wife. They settled in Augusta, and with others from New York formed the earliest Methodist society in Canada. Paul died several years before his wife, in the late 18th century.

She was honored by the Office of the Manhattan Borough President in March 2008 and was included in a map of historical sites related or dedicated to important women. A number of Methodist denominations, such as the Allegheny Wesleyan Methodist Connection and Immanuel Missionary Church, continue to oppose the use of playing cards as being sinful, due to their association with idle friviolty and gambling.
