= John Street Methodist Church =

Church in Manhattan, New York

- John Street United Methodist Church
- U.S. National Register of Historic Places
- New York State Register of Historic Places
- New York City Landmark
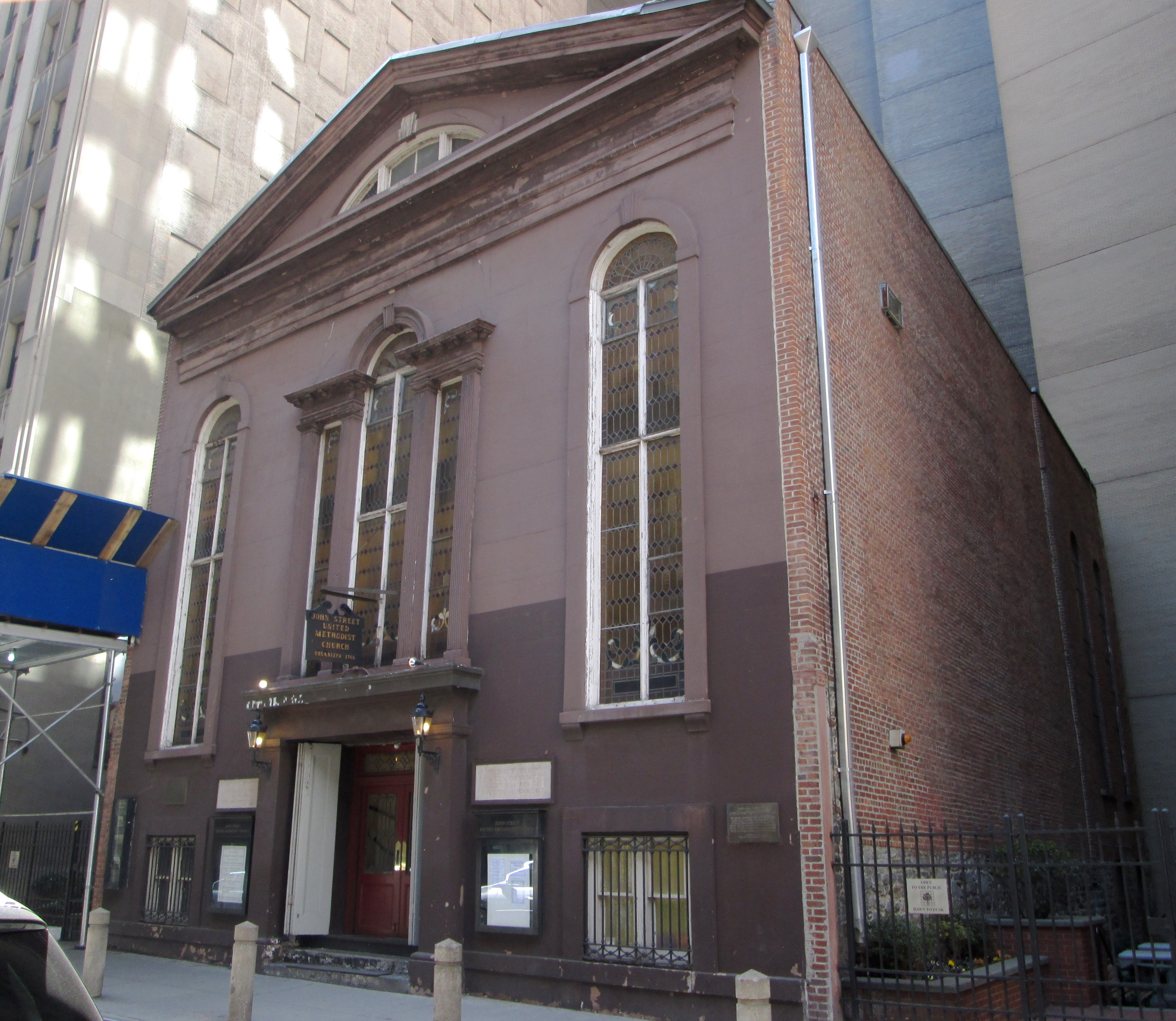
- (2013)

- Location within Lower Manhattan Location within New York Location within the United States
- Location: 44 John Street; Manhattan, New York City
- Coordinates: 40°42′32.55″N 74°0′28.8″W
- Built: 1841
- Architect: Philip Embury
- Architectural style: Georgian
- NRHP reference No.: 73001219
- NYSRHP No.: 06101.000416
- NYCL No.: 0055

Significant dates
- Added to NRHP: June 4, 1973
- Designated NYSRHP: June 23, 1980
- Designated NYCL: December 21, 1965

The John Street United Methodist Church – also known as Old John Street Methodist Episcopal Church – located at 44 John Street between Nassau and William Streets in the Financial District of Manhattan, New York City was built in 1841 in the Georgian style, with the design attributed to William Hurry and/or Philip Embury. The congregation is the oldest Methodist congregation in North America, founded on October 12, 1766 as the Wesleyan Society in America.

== History ==
The Society built its first church, a blue stucco barn called the Wesley Chapel, on this site in 1768; its design was attributed to Barbara Heck. Timber from the Chapel was later used in building the Bowery Village Methodist Church and the Park Avenue United Methodist Church. The second church on this site was built in 1817-18, and the extravagance of the building provoked a secession from the congregation by Rev. William Stillwell. The third church, the current one, was necessitated by the widening of John Street.

The church was designated a New York City Landmark in 1965 and added to the National Register of Historic Places in 1973. In 1984, the church sold its air rights to 33 Maiden Lane.

Hymnist Fanny Crosby was a member of the church congregation for many years.

== Museum ==
Below the sanctuary, the Wesley Chapel Museum displays many artifacts from eighteenth- and nineteenth-century American Methodist history. These include church record books, the Wesley Clock (a gift of John Wesley, 1769), love feast cups, class meeting circular benches, the original 1785 altar rail, the original 1767 pulpit made by Philip Embury, and Embury's signed Bible.

== See also ==
- National Register of Historic Places listings in Manhattan below 14th Street
- List of New York City Designated Landmarks in Manhattan below 14th Street
