= Congregational polity =

Local form of church government

Congregational or congregationalist polity is a system of ecclesiastical polity in which every local church is completely independent and ecclesiastically sovereign. Its first articulation in writing is the Cambridge Platform of 1648 in New England. The name comes from Congregationalism, a Protestant tradition descended from English Puritanism, a 16th and 17th century Reformed Protestant movement in the Church of England.

Major Protestant Christian traditions that employ congregational polity include Congregationalists, Pentecostals, and most modern Baptist churches. Some ecclesiastical bodies that have congregational polity include the Congregational Methodist Church, the American Baptist Churches USA, the United Church of Christ (with a mix of Presbyterian polity), and many others.

More recent generations have witnessed a growing number of nondenominational churches, which are often congregationalist in their governance. Although autonomous, like minded congregations may enter into voluntary associations with other congregations, sometimes called conventions, denominations, or associations.

Congregationalism is distinguished from episcopal polity which is governance by a hierarchy of bishops, and is also distinct from presbyterian polity in which higher assemblies of congregational representatives can exercise considerable authority over individual congregations.

Congregationalism is not limited only to organization of Christian church congregations. The principles of congregationalism have been inherited by the Unitarian Universalist Association and the Canadian Unitarian Council.

== Basic form ==
The term congregational polity describes a form of church governance that is based on the local congregation. Each local congregation is independent and self-supporting, governed by its own members. Some band into loose voluntary associations with other congregations that share similar beliefs (e.g., the Willow Creek Association and the Unitarian Universalist Association). Others join "conventions", such as the Southern Baptist Convention, the National Baptist Convention or the American Baptist Churches USA (formerly the Triennial Convention). These conventions generally provide stronger ties between congregations, including some doctrinal direction and pooling of financial resources. Congregations that belong to associations and conventions are still independently governed. Most non-denominational churches are organized along congregationalist lines. Many do not see these voluntary associations as "denominations", because they "believe that there is no church other than the local church, and denominations are in variance to Scripture."

== Denominational families ==
These Christian traditions use forms of congregational polity.

=== Congregational churches ===
Congregationalism is a Protestant tradition with roots in the Puritan and Independent movements. In congregational government, the covenanted congregation exists prior to its officers, and as such the members are equipped to call and dismiss their ministers without oversight from any higher ecclesiastical body. Their churches ordinarily have at least one pastor, but may also install ruling elders.

Statements of polity in the congregational tradition called "platforms". These include the Savoy Confession's platform, the Cambridge Platform, and the Saybrook Platform. Denominations in the congregational tradition include the UCC, NACCC, CCCC, and EFCC. Denominations in the tradition support but do not govern their constituent members.

=== Baptist churches ===
Most Baptists hold that no denominational or ecclesiastical organization has inherent authority over an individual Baptist church. Churches can properly relate to each other under this polity only through voluntary cooperation, never by any sort of coercion. Furthermore, this Baptist polity calls for freedom from governmental control. Exceptions to this local form of local governance include the Episcopal Baptists that have an episcopal system.

Independent Baptist churches have no formal organizational structure above the level of the local congregation. More generally among Baptists, a variety of parachurch agencies and evangelical educational institutions may be supported generously or not at all, depending entirely upon the local congregation's customs and predilections. Usually doctrinal conformity is held as a first consideration when a church makes a decision to grant or decline financial contributions to such agencies, which are legally external and separate from the congregations they serve. These practices also find currency among non-denominational fundamentalist or charismatic fellowships, many of which derive from Baptist origins, culturally if not theologically.

Most Southern Baptist and National Baptist congregations, by contrast, generally relate more closely to external groups such as mission agencies and educational institutions than do those of independent persuasion. However, they adhere to a very similar ecclesiology, refusing to permit outside control or oversight of the affairs of the local church.

=== Churches of Christ ===
Ecclesiastical government is congregational rather than denominational. Churches of Christ purposefully have no central headquarters, councils, or other organizational structure above the local church level. (Note: According to The Encyclopedia of the Stone-Campbell Movement: Churches of Christ from the beginning have maintained no formal organization structures larger than the local congregations and no official journals or vehicles declaring sanctioned positions. Consensus views do, however, often emerge through the influence of opinion leaders who express themselves in journals, at lectureships, or at area preacher meetings and other gatherings.) Rather, the independent congregations are a network with each congregation participating at its own discretion in various means of service and fellowship with other congregations. (Note: Everett Ferguson wrote, "Churches of Christ adhere to a strict congregationalism that cooperates in various projects overseen by one congregation or organized as parachurch enterprises, but many congregations hold themselves apart from such cooperative projects.") Churches of Christ are linked by their shared commitment to restoration principles.

Congregations are generally overseen by a plurality of elders (also known in some congregations as shepherds, bishops, or pastors) who are sometimes assisted in the administration of various works by deacons. Elders are generally seen as responsible for the spiritual welfare of the congregation, while deacons are seen as responsible for the non-spiritual needs of the church. Deacons serve under the supervision of the elders, and are often assigned to direct specific ministries. Successful service as a deacon is often seen as preparation for the eldership. Elders and deacons are chosen by the congregation based on the qualifications found in Timothy 3 and Titus 1. Congregations look for elders who have a mature enough understanding of scripture to enable them to supervise the minister and to teach, as well as to perform governance functions. In lieu of willing men who meet these qualifications, congregations are sometimes overseen by an unelected committee of the congregation's men.

While the early Restoration Movement had a tradition of itinerant preachers rather than "located Preachers", during the 20th century a long-term, formally trained congregational minister became the norm among Churches of Christ. Ministers are understood to serve under the oversight of the elders. While the presence of a long-term professional minister has sometimes created "significant de facto ministerial authority" and led to conflict between the minister and the elders, the eldership has remained the "ultimate locus of authority in the congregation". There is a small group within the Churches of Christ which oppose a single preacher and, instead, rotate preaching duties among qualified elders (this group tends to overlap with groups which oppose Sunday School and also have only one cup to serve the Lord's Supper).

Churches of Christ hold to the priesthood of all believers. No special titles are used for preachers or ministers that would identify them as clergy. Churches of Christ emphasize that there is no distinction between "clergy" and "laity" and that every member has a gift and a role to play in accomplishing the work of the church.

=== Methodist churches ===
Methodists who disagreed with the episcopal polity of the Methodist Episcopal Church, South left their mother church to form the Congregational Methodist Church, which retains Wesleyan theology but adopts congregationalist polity as a distinctive. Both the First Congregational Methodist Church and the Southern Congregational Methodist Church are Methodist denominations that emerged from the Congregational Methodist Church in 1852 and 1982, respectively.

The New Congregational Methodist Church separated from the Methodist Episcopal Church, South in 1881.

The Evangelical Congregational Church, a Methodist denomination, has congregational polity.

== See also ==
- Acephali
- United and uniting churches
- English Presbyterianism
