= Southern Congregational Methodist Church =

- Classification: Methodism
- Orientation: Wesleyan-Holiness movement
- Theology: Wesleyan-Arminian
- Polity: Congregational
- Region: Worldwide
- Separated from: Congregational Methodist Church
- Congregations: 29 (2007)

The Southern Congregational Methodist Church (SCMC) is a Methodist denomination within the Wesleyan-Holiness movement of Christianity. It reported 29 churches located in the Southern United States as of 2007.

== Background ==
The Southern Congregational Methodist Church was formed in 1985.

The Southern Congregational Methodist Church espouses an Evangelical doctrine and a number of their churches are found largely in rural areas of the American South. The churches emphasize "the basic fundamental doctrines of the historic Christian faith within the framework of traditional Methodism" typical of Wesleyan Methodist bodies in the holiness movement.

The governmental structure of the church is made up of monthly local church conferences, annual district conferences, and quadrennial general conferences.

Southern Congregational Methodist churches were found in the following U.S. states as of 2007: Alabama, Florida, Georgia, Mississippi, Tennessee, and Texas. The denomination supported two mission groups as of 2007. As of 2015, several Southern Congregational Methodist Churches were found on the roster of the larger Congregational Methodist Church. In 1984, as well as during the 2020–2024 schism in the United Methodist Church, some former United Methodist congregations joined the Southern Congregational Methodist Church, such as Alma Christian Fellowship SCMC and Elizabeth Southern Congregational Methodist Chapel in Alma, Georgia.

The camp meeting of the Southern Congregational Methodist Church is held annually in Alma, Georgia at the campground of the denomination, Southern Congregational Methodist Campground.

== See also ==
- Congregational Methodist Church
- Methodism
- Methodist Episcopal Church, South
- Holiness movement
