= Robert Strawbridge =

Irish-born American Methodist preacher

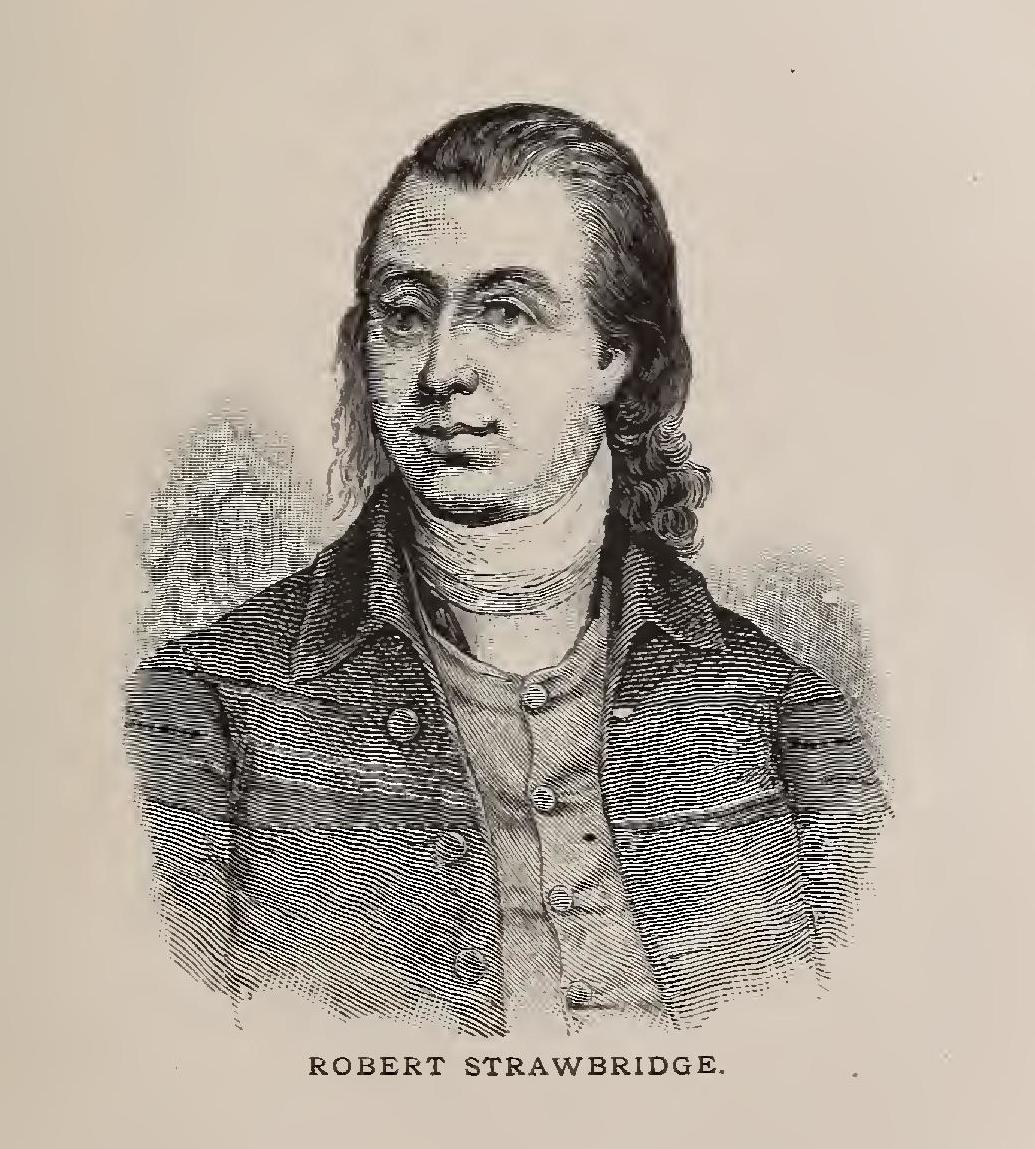

Robert Strawbridge (born 1732 - died 1781) was a Methodist preacher born in Drumsna, County Leitrim, Ireland.

== Early life and ancestral history ==
Information detailing the early life of Robert Strawbridge is somewhat limited. One article, Robert Strawbridge, offers some light unto the subject. Another source, Robert Strawbridge: Some Additional Irish Perspectives offers additional details.

In the year 1732, Robert Strawbridge was born in a small farming town in the county of Leitrim, Ireland. The town of Gortconnellan, Drumsna situates on a ridge. The town's name literally means "the ridge over the swimming place." It is here along the south-eastern flow of the majestic River Shannon, makes a series of turns which create a perfect loop before regaining its original course. The result of the back-tracking waterway is a protected area blessed with the country's most fertile and wooded lands. It is these abundant lands which Robert grows up. The farm with a privileged view of the river will house Robert until his 24th birthday. Crimmins (1905) calls him a native of the nearby Carrick on Shannon, County Leitrim.

The land which the Strawbridge family lives on is a gift to an ancestor one-hundred and fifty years before, when the English King James transplanted English families in the hopes of gaining strategic lands along the bountiful River Shannon. To the Catholic citizens of Ireland, this transplanting of Englishmen by the Anglican King was tantamount to military and religious conquest. Despite the native opposition, the transplanting occurs, creating a line of natural-resource- abundant towns along the Shannon. The town of Drumsna is one of these new settlements.

Robert's Anglican household, in a gesture to disgruntled Irish neighbors, names him after his maternal grandfather. According to JR Wesley Weir in his article, Robert Strawbridge: Some Additional Irish Perspectives, "the long-held Irish tradition is to name the oldest son after the paternal grandfather and the next son after the maternal grandfather." Because of this, it is likely that Robert is the second son born to his parents.

== Ministry ==
From 1756, when he converted to Christianity, Robert went on preaching tours during the summer months. He was converted by Laurence Coughlan who was brought up in a traditional Irish-Catholic family.

Robert decided to go against institutionalized religion of the Anglican Church. As a result of this, he decided to go against John Wesley's admonition that no Methodist preachers are to distribute the sacraments without being ordained by the Anglican Church. Wesley, initially, was not seeking the separation of Methodism from the Anglican Church. He did all he could to instill confidence that his Methodist efforts were mainly a revival movement within the Anglican Church. In Ireland, the independent spirit of several of the early Irish Methodist preachers thought otherwise. As a result of his religious stance, the Anglican and Wesleyan Methodist population in Drumsna asked him to leave only a few months after his initial efforts. As such, Robert left to go on another preaching tour. His stops in the neighboring counties of Sligo and Kilmore, eventually end in the County of Armagh, specifically the town of Terryhoogan. In Terryhoogan he meet his future wife. They marry shortly before 1760. Also in 1760, Robert and his wife emigrate to Maryland.

Methodist preacher Robert Strawbridge settled in Sam's Creek, Maryland (part of Appalachia) to preach in 1760. He built the first Methodist meetinghouse in America, and Methodism spread throughout all of Appalachia. Revival meetings and camp meetings, in which Methodists of the holiness movement preached the doctrines of the new birth and entire sanctification, resulted in the growth of the Church in Appalachia. In the present-day, Methodists form the dominant Christian denomination West Virginia, part of Appalachia.

Circa 1760, Robert and Eliza emigrated across the Atlantic Ocean to the Maryland colony, where they established a farm in what was then the back country connecting the Monocacy River Valley to Baltimore at New Windsor in Carroll County. Around 1763, Strawbridge established a school to teach his neighbors, including an enslaved African woman named Annie Sweitzer. He also road circuit, and trained preachers, including Rev. Edward Dromgoole, who had converted from Catholicism to Methodism in Ireland, and was considered to be one of the four main evangelists in southern Virginia and North Carolina.

== Death and legacy ==
Strawbridge died in 1781, and his early log Methodist meetinghouse has been reconstructed by the Methodist church as the Strawbridge Shrine.

== See also ==
- Philip Embury
