= Philip Embury =

Irish-American Method Preacher (1729–1775)

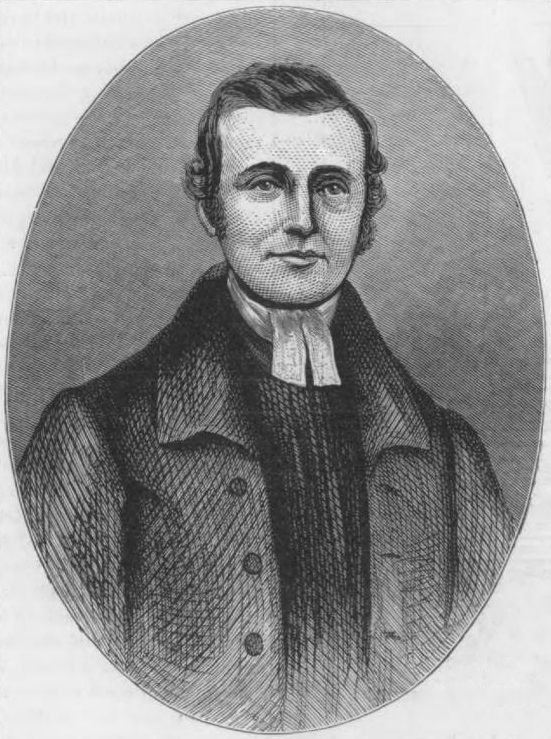
- Born: 21 September 1729; Ballygaran, County Limerick, Ireland
- Died: August 1775 (aged 45); Camden, New York, U.S.
- Occupation: Clergyman
- Spouse: Margaret Switzer (m. 1758)

Philip Embury (21 September 1729 – August 1775) was a Methodist preacher, a leader of one of the earliest Methodist congregations in the United States.

== Biography ==
Philip Embury was born in Ballygaran, County Limerick, on 21 September 1729. His parents were members of the colony of Germans that emigrated from the Palatinate to Ireland early in the eighteenth century, and in which John Wesley labored with great success. The colony had formed from Protestant Germans forced to abandon their farms on the Rhine due to French Catholic raids and a harsh winter. In 1709, Queen Anne of England accepted the refugees, settling a group of families in Catholic Ireland to boost the Protestant presence. Embury was educated at a school near Ballingrane, County Limerick, and learned the carpenter's trade. He was converted on Christmas day, 1752, became a local preacher at Court-Matrix in 1758, and married Margaret Switzer that fall.

In 1760, due to rising rents and scarce land, he came to New York City and worked as a school teacher. In common with his fellow emigrants, he began to lose interest in religious matters, and did not preach in New York till 1766, when, moved by the reproaches of Barbara Heck, sometimes called the "foundress of American Methodism," he began to hold services first in his own house on Barrack Street, now Park Place, and then in a rigging loft on what is now William Street. The congregation thus formed was probably the first Methodist congregation in the United States, though it is a disputed question whether precedence should not be given to Robert Strawbridge, who began laboring in Maryland about this time. Before this, he and his cousin Barbara Heck had worshiped along with other Irish Palatines at Trinity Lutheran Church where three of his children had been baptized.

The first Methodist church was built under Embury's charge in 1768, in association with Thomas Webb and others, on the site of the present John Street Church, and he himself worked on the building as a carpenter, and afterward preached there gratuitously. In 1769, preachers sent out by John Wesley arrived in New York City, and Embury went to work in the vicinity of Albany at Camden Valley, New York, where he continued to work at his trade during the week, and preached every Sunday. He and several others had received a grant of 8,000 acres (32 km^{2}) to develop for the manufacture of linen. He organized among Irish emigrants at Ashgrove, near Camden Valley, the first Methodist society within the bounds of what became the flourishing and influential Troy Conference.

He died suddenly, in consequence of an accident in mowing, in August 1775, (Note: Some sources list August 1773.) and was buried on a neighboring farm. In 1832, his remains were removed to Ashgrove churchyard, and in 1866 to Woodland Cemetery, Cambridge, New York, where in 1873 a monument to him was unveiled, with an address by Bishop Matthew Simpson.

== See also ==
- New Hampshire historical marker no. 60: First Methodist Meeting Place in New Hampshire
