= Immanuel Missionary Church =

Methodist denomination

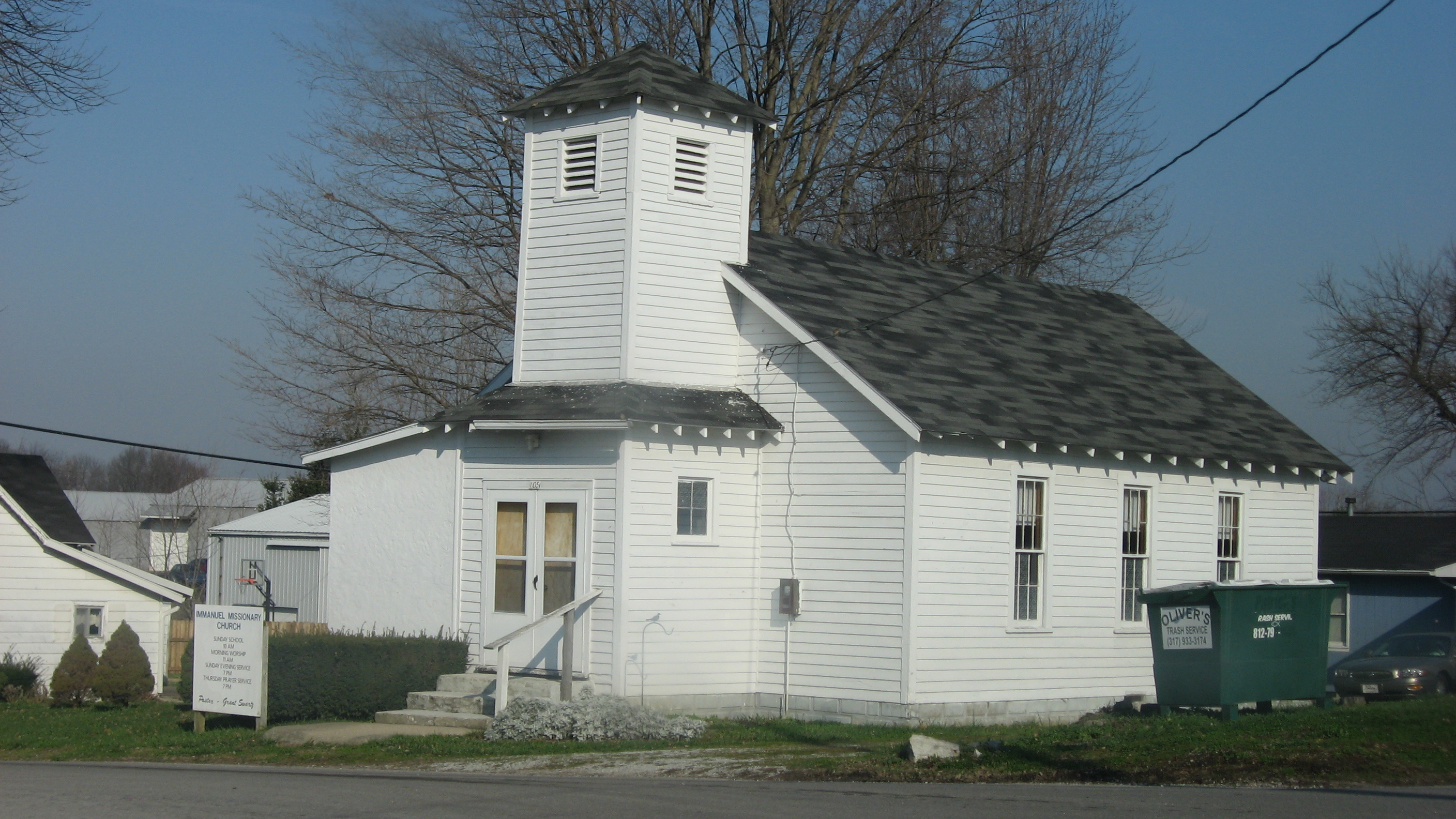
- A parish church in Elizabethtown belonging to the Immanuel Missionary Church
- Classification: Methodism
- Orientation: Conservative holiness movement
- Polity: Connexionalism
- Associations: Interchurch Holiness Convention
- Origin: June 1936
- Separated from: Pilgrim Holiness Church

The Immanuel Missionary Church (IMC) is a Methodist denomination within the conservative holiness movement.

The formation of the Immanuel Missionary Church is a part of the history of Methodism in the United States. The Immanuel Missionary Church was born out of a schism with the Pilgrim Holiness Church under the leadership of Ralph Goodrich Finch and D.W. Reynolds due to differences in the interpretation of the Methodist doctrine of entire sanctification; the connexion that became the Immanuel Missionary Church laid heavy emphasis on the death route to entire sanctification, in which "The body of sin must be destroyed for the second work of grace to be true" (cf. Romans 6:6). Immanuel Missionary Church was organized at a camp meeting held at All States Cabin Camp in June 1936. Its first Book of Discipline was written during that time.

The Immanuel Missionary Church originally had two districts, an Eastern District and Western District. In 2015, the Western District of Immanuel Missionary Church merged with God's Missionary Church, while the Eastern District of Immanuel Missionary Church unanimously voted not to do so citing the desire to uphold its traditional holiness standards as well as the Holiness Methodist Pacifist doctrine of nonresistance, which it sees as being given by Jesus.

The Immanuel Missionary Church was affiliated with Immanuel Missionary College in Shoals, Indiana until its closure in 1986; it was also affiliated with Peoples Bible College in Colorado Springs until its closure in May 1994. The choir of God's Bible School and College is noted to tour at Immanuel Missionary Church congregations.

The official organ of the Immanuel Missionary Church is The Immanuel Missionary. The connexion's Singing Hills Camp Meeting occurred annually in Shoals, Indiana, and since 2023, now takes place at Wesleyan Holiness Campground in Springfield, Illinois. The Immanuel Missionary Church has congregations in Indiana, Florida, Missouri, Oklahoma, Colorado, among other parts of the world.

With respect to ecumenism, some members of the Immanuel Missionary Church participate in the Interchurch Holiness Convention.

== See also ==
- Emmanuel Association of Churches
