= Laurence Coughlan =

Irish preacher active in Newfoundland

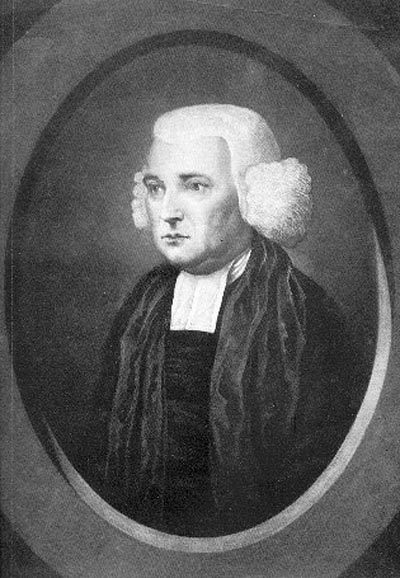
- Died: 1784
- Awards: Persons of National Historic Significance

Laurence Coughlan (?-1784?) was an Irish-born itinerant preacher who was active in Newfoundland during the period 1766–1773. Though born a Roman Catholic, ordained and employed as an Anglican, and at one point even ordained by a Greek Orthodox bishop, his true religious affiliation was Methodism, to which he converted in the 1750s. Coughlan is regarded as a founder of the Methodist Church in Newfoundland (later incorporated into the United Church of Canada).

In the years after his conversion, Coughlan served as a lay preacher in England and Ireland, and for a time was a close associate of Methodist founder John Wesley. However, Coughlan's subjective, enthusiastic, emotional, and feeling-based approach to his faith and ministry later led Wesley to distance himself from him. This was exacerbated by Coughlan's ordination in 1764, along with several other Methodists, by a certain Erasmus, said to be a Greek Orthodox bishop.

In the 1760s, a group in the Harbour Grace, Newfoundland area were attempting to procure a minister. In 1766, through the mediation of a local merchant with connections in England, a request was made to the Bishop of London to ordain Coughlan and provide for him to travel to Newfoundland. The reason for the choice of Coughlan for this mission is unclear, but it is known that both the Newfoundland group and their contacts in England had links to Dissenters. The entreaty was successful, and Coughlan was ordained by the Bishop of Chester in April 1766. Shortly thereafter, Coughlan left for Newfoundland; a few months later, his ministry came under the auspices of the Society for the Propagation of the Gospel in Foreign Parts (SPG).

Initially, Coughlan carried out the expected duties of an Anglican priest, performed the sacraments, established a school and chapels, and became a Justice of the Peace. However, his real theological motivation was to spread Methodism, which he did through the Methodist practice of small group meetings and classes, and house to house preaching, emphasizing a simple, emotional spirituality, a life of personal morality, and the necessity of a personal conversion or "born again" experience. By his own account, in his 1776 publication An Account of the Work of God in Newfoundland, his attempts to inspire a Methodist "revival" met with little success for three years; after which, the sorts of "noisy" conversions that he encouraged began to take place.

Coughlan's mission was to the lower classes, fishermen and planters, and many of his converts were women. His popularity among the elite and merchant classes, however, was somewhat lacking, and this sector caused Coughlan much trouble and eventually led to his leaving Newfoundland. For one thing, his Methodist ways did not go unnoticed: in 1770 he denied communion to those who did not participate in Methodist meetings; though the charge did not stick, he did admit his preference in such matters. Some of the tension may have been economic in origin, as the improvement in the personal and economic conduct of the Methodist converts helped them to become more independent of the local merchants. Coughlan was eventually forced to resign his position in 1773 after refusing to allow a merchant to act as godfather, questioning the man's morals.

Back in England, Coughlan was unsuccessful in rejoining the orthodox Methodist movement, and instead spend his time among Methodist Dissenters with a Calvinist orientation. His 1776 Account recounts his ministry in Newfoundland, and, while decrying the severity of the climate, displays a great affection for the "simple", "artless" people of his congregation, praising their practical "genius" despite their lack of formal education. It also contains descriptions of deathbed conversions, and letters from supporters.
