= Congregational Methodist Church =

Methodist church

- Classification: Methodism
- Orientation: Wesleyan-Holiness movement
- Theology: Wesleyan-Arminian
- Polity: Congregational
- Region: Worldwide
- Headquarters: Florence, Mississippi
- Origin: 1852; Georgia
- Separated from: Methodist Episcopal Church, South
- Separations: First Congregational Methodist Church (1852); First Congregational Methodist Church of the USA (1941); Reformed New Congregational Methodist Church (1916); Southern Congregational Methodist Church (1982)
- Congregations: 209 (2024)
- Members: 14,738 (1995)
- Official website: Official website

The Congregational Methodist Church (CMC) is a Methodist denomination of Christianity based in North America. It is aligned with the Holiness movement and adheres to Wesleyan-Arminian theology. As of 1995, the denomination reported 14,738 members in 187 churches.

== Background ==
The Congregational Methodist Church was founded in Georgia in 1852 when several churches split from the Methodist Episcopal Church, South, out of a desire to blend Methodist doctrine with congregational polity.

The Congregational Methodist Church is Wesleyan-Arminian in doctrine, congregational in its system of worship, republican or representative in its system of government, connexional in nature, missionary in outlook, evangelistic in endeavor, and cooperative in spirit. Each local church calls its pastor, owns its property, and sets its budget.

As of late 2024 its congregations are located in Alabama, Florida, Georgia, Indiana, Iowa, Louisiana, Massachusetts, Mississippi, Missouri, New Jersey, New Mexico, Ohio, Oklahoma, South Carolina, Tennessee, Texas, Virginia, Wisconsin, and the Mexican states of Coahuila and Tamaulipas. It also has missionaries in the United States, Mexico, Belize, and Haiti.

In 1944, the Congregational Methodist Church, then headquartered in Dallas, Texas, established The Dallas Bible School, an institution of higher education. The school was moved to Tehuacana, Texas, for several years, and was renamed Westminster College and Bible Institute. The school was permanently relocated to Florence, Mississippi in 1972, and was renamed Wesley College, a name that reflected its Wesleyan-Arminian tradition. Wesley College was closed in July 2010.

The church's denominational headquarters are located in Florence, Mississippi, serving churches and programs of the denomination.

In 2023, a few congregations of the United Methodist Church left that denomination to join the Congregational Methodist Church or Free Methodist Church (and many more joining the newly minted traditionalist Global Methodist Church) due to a major schism that arose over the issue of allowing gay clergy and/or weddings.
