= First Congregational Methodist Church =

The First Congregational Methodist Church (often abbreviated as FCMC or FCM Church) is a Methodist Christian denomination in the Southern United States. It has its theological roots in the teachings of John Wesley and adheres to the Methodist Articles of Religion. As of 2021 it reported 12 local congregations.

The FCM was founded on 8 May 1852 when several churches split from the Congregational Methodist Church which had itself split three years earlier from the Methodist Episcopal Church, South. The connexion's first hierarch was Rev. William Fambough. Its first Book of Discipline was published under the leadership of Rev. Hiram Phinazee.

The First Congregational Methodist Church is Evangelical in ministry, Low Church in liturgy and takes a conservative stance on social issues. The FCM Church maintains headquarters in Boaz, Alabama where its camp meeting is held. Its periodical is called The Watchman.
