= Book of Discipline =

Book containing the canon law, doctrines, and rituals of a Christian denomination

A Book of Discipline (or in its shortened form Discipline) is a book detailing the beliefs, standards, doctrines, canon law, and polity of a particular Christian denomination. They are often re-written by the governing body of the church concerned due to changes in society and in the denomination itself. As many Christian denominations are global, a Book of Discipline may be multilingual.

== By Christian denomination ==
=== Methodism ===
Methodist connexions have been using a Book of Discipline since 1784, which contains canon law and doctrine:

- The Discipline of the Allegheny Wesleyan Methodist Connection
- The Discipline of the Evangelical Wesleyan Church
- Book of Discipline of the Free Methodist Church
- Book of Discipline for the United Methodist Church
- Discipline of the Immanuel Missionary Church
- The Discipline of the Wesleyan Methodist Connection

=== Presbyterianism ===
- Book of Discipline of the Church of Scotland and Book of Common Order of the Church of Scotland

=== Quakerism ===
Within Quaker Christianity, the text may be known as a Book of Discipline or a Manual of Faith and Practice:

- Book of Discipline of the Religious Society of Friends (Quakers) - each Yearly Meeting (national organisation of Quakers) publishes its own Book of Discipline, which may be titled the Book of Discipline or Faith and Practice or some other name.

== See also ==
- Code of conduct, a set of rules outlining the norms, rules, and responsibilities or proper practices of an individual party or an organization.
- Confessionalism (religion), belief that full assent to official teachings is important
- Creed, a statement of the shared beliefs of a community which summarize its core tenets
- Ordnung, the set of rules for church members in the Anabaptist tradition
- Rule of life, a ruleset describing a lifeway of a religious group
- Social norm, a shared standard of acceptable behavior by a group
