= Wesley =

Wesley may refer to:

== People and fictional characters ==
- Wesley (name), a given name and a surname

== Places ==
=== United States ===
- Wesley, Arkansas, an unincorporated community
- Wesley, Georgia, an unincorporated community
- Wesley Township, Will County, Illinois
- Wesley, Iowa, a city in Kossuth County
- Wesley Township, Kossuth County, Iowa
- Wesley, Maine, a town
- Wesley Township, Washington County, Ohio
- Wesley, Oklahoma, an unincorporated community
- Wesley, Indiana, an unincorporated town
- Wesley, West Virginia, an unincorporated community

=== Elsewhere ===
- Wesley, a hamlet in the township of Stone Mills, Ontario, Canada
- Wesley, Dominica, a village
- Wesley, New Zealand, a suburb of Auckland
- Wesley, Eastern Cape, South Africa, a town

== Schools ==
- Wesley College (disambiguation)
- Wesley Institute, Sydney, Australia
- Wesley Seminary, Marion, Indiana
- Wesley Biblical Seminary, Jackson, Mississippi
- Wesley Theological Seminary, Washington, DC
- Wesley University of Science and Technology, Ondo, Nigeria
- Wesley Girls' High School, Ghana

== Other uses ==
- Wesley (film), a 2009 film
- Wesley (TV series), a 1949 American sitcom
- Wesley House (disambiguation)
- Wesley Hospital (Brisbane), Australia

== See also ==
- Wesley Church (disambiguation)
- Wesley Chapel (disambiguation)
- Wesley's Chapel, London, England
- Wesley Methodist Cathedral (disambiguation)
- Wesley Foundation
- Wesley Mission, various United Church missions
- Weslley (disambiguation)
- Westley (disambiguation)
- Vesly (disambiguation)
