= Wesleyan University (disambiguation) =

Wesleyan University and Wesleyan College are the names of educational institutions derived from the adjective Wesleyan.

Colleges and universities named Wesleyan include:

| Institution | Founded | Location | Affiliation & notes |
|---|---|---|---|
| Wesleyan University | 1831 | Middletown, Connecticut | Independent. Liberal arts college. |
| Wesleyan College | 1836 | Macon, Georgia | Independent. Women's liberal arts college. |
| Wesleyan University Philippines | 1946 | Cabanatuan, Philippines | United Methodist Church / from primary, secondary to university |

Colleges and universities with Wesleyan in their name include:

| Institution | Founded | Location | Affiliation & notes |
|---|---|---|---|
| Allegheny Wesleyan College | 1957 | Salem, Ohio | Allegheny Wesleyan Methodist Connection |
| Central Wesleyan College | 1864 | Warrenton, Missouri | Methodist Church. Defunct. |
| Dakota Wesleyan University | 1885 | Mitchell, South Dakota | United Methodist Church |
| Evangelical Wesleyan Bible Institute | 1963 | Cooperstown, Pennsylvania | Evangelical Wesleyan Church |
| Genesee Wesleyan Seminary | 1831–1942 | Lima, New York | Not strictly college level |
| Illinois Wesleyan University | 1850 | Bloomington, Illinois | Independent. Liberal arts college. |
| Indiana Wesleyan University | 1920 | Marion, Indiana | Wesleyan Church |
| Iowa Wesleyan University | 1843 | Mt. Pleasant, Iowa | United Methodist Church |
| Kansas Wesleyan University | 1886 | Salina, Kansas | United Methodist Church |
| Kentucky Wesleyan College | 1850 | Owensboro, Kentucky | United Methodist Church |
| Miltonvale Wesleyan College | 1909 | Miltonvale, Kansas | Wesleyan Church |
| Montana Wesleyan University | 1890 | Helena, Montana | Methodist Episcopal Church |
| Nagasaki Wesleyan University | 1881 | Isahaya, Nagasaki, Japan | unknown |
| Nebraska Wesleyan University | 1887 | Lincoln, Nebraska | United Methodist Church |
| North Carolina Wesleyan University | 1956 | Rocky Mount, North Carolina | United Methodist Church |
| Ohio Wesleyan University | 1842 | Delaware, Ohio | United Methodist Church |
| Oklahoma Wesleyan University | 1909 | Bartlesville, Oklahoma | Wesleyan Church |
| Roberts Wesleyan University | 1945 | North Chili, New York | Free Methodist Church |
| Southern Wesleyan University | 1906 | Central, South Carolina | Wesleyan Church |
| Tennessee Wesleyan University | 1857 | Athens, Tennessee | United Methodist Church |
| Texas Wesleyan University | 1890 | Fort Worth, Texas | United Methodist Church |
| Virginia Wesleyan University | 1961 | Virginia Beach, Virginia | United Methodist Church |
| West Virginia Wesleyan College | 1890 | Buckhannon, West Virginia | United Methodist Church |

Learned societies with Wesleyan in their name include:

| Society | Founded | Journal | Notes |
|---|---|---|---|
| Wesleyan Theological Society | 1966 | Wesleyan Theological Journal | |
| Wesleyan Philosophical Society | 2001 | Wesleyan Philosophical Online Journal | Wesleyan Philosophical Society |

Other colleges and universities with a Wesleyan affiliation include:

| Institution | Founded | Location | Affiliation & notes |
|---|---|---|---|
| Asbury University | 1890 | Wilmore, Kentucky | Wesleyan-Holiness Tradition |
| Kingswood University | 1945 | Sussex, New Brunswick | The Wesleyan Church |
| Houghton College | 1883 | Houghton New York | The Wesleyan Church |
| Kentucky Mountain Bible College | 1931 | Vancleve, Kentucky | Wesleyan Arminian & Theology |
| Wesley Biblical Seminary | 1974 | Jackson, Mississippi | Theological Education |
| Wesley Seminary | 2009 | Marion, Indiana | The Wesleyan Church; Indiana Wesleyan University |

== See also ==
- List of evangelical seminaries and theological colleges#Methodist
- Wesley College (disambiguation)
- Wellesley College
