= Wesley (name) =

Wesley is a name with an Anglo-Saxon (Old English) etymology. It is derived from the surname "Westlēah". The "Wes" portion of the name refers to the cardinal direction "West"; the "ley" portion is from "lēah", meaning a field, pasture, meadow, or other clearing in a forest. Thus, the name's origin refers to a "western lēah," or a field to the west.

The name was predominantly used as a surname until John Wesley, founder of the Methodist movement, inspired some parents to name their sons after him.

== Surname ==
- The Wesley family, founders of Methodism and noted musicians, including:
  - Samuel Wesley (poet, died 1735) (1662–1735), minister and Stuart poet
  - Samuel Wesley (poet, died 1739), or Samuel Wesley the Younger, son of Samuel (1662–1735)
  - John Wesley (1703–1791), son of Samuel (1662–1735), the principal founder of the Methodist denomination of Protestant Christianity
  - Charles Wesley (1707–1788), son of Samuel (1662–1735), Methodist leader and prolific hymn writer
  - Charles Wesley junior (1757–1834), son of Charles (1707–1788), organist, composer
  - Samuel Wesley (composer, born 1766) (1766–1837), son of Charles (1707–1788), organist, composer
  - Samuel Sebastian Wesley (1810–1876), son of the Samuel (1766–1837), organist, composer
  - Susanna Wesley (1669–1742), wife of Samuel Wesley (1662–1735)
- Antoine Wesley (born 1997), American football player
- Arthur Wellesley, 1st Duke of Wellington (1769–1852), a British soldier and statesman best known for defeating Napoleon, was born as Arthur Wesley
- August Wesley (1887–1942), Finnish journalist, trade unionist and revolutionary
- Barry Wesley (born 1999), American football player
- Bill Wesley (born 1971), American politician
- Blake Wesley (ice hockey) (born 1959), former Canadian professional ice hockey player
- Blake Wesley (basketball) (born 2003), American basketball player
- Charles Wesley (1896–1944), Negro league baseball player
- Dante Wesley (born 1979), American football player
- David Wesley (born 1970), retired American basketball player
- Fred Wesley (born 1943), American jazz trombonist
- Glen Wesley (born 1968), former Canadian National Hockey League player
- John Wesley (guitarist) (born 1962), American musician
- Mary Wesley (1912–2002), British author
- Paul Wesley (born 1982), American actor
- Richard Wesley (born 1945), African American playwright
- Rutina Wesley (born 1979), American actress
- Dorsey Wesley, American record producer known as Megahertz
- Walt Wesley (born 1945), former American basketball player
- William Wesley (born 1964), American basketball player and agent

== Given name ==
- Wesley (footballer, born 1980) (Wesley Lopes da Silva), Brazilian footballer
- Wesley (footballer, born 1981) (Wesley Barbosa De Morais), Brazilian footballer
- Wesley (footballer, born 1987) (Wesley Lopes Beltrame), Brazilian footballer
- Wesley (footballer, born 1989) (Wesley Karlos Piedade), Brazilian footballer
- Wesley (footballer, born 1990) (Wesley Pacheco Gomes), Brazilian footballer
- Wesley (footballer, born 1992) (Wesley dos Santos Rodrigues), Brazilian footballer
- Wesley (footballer, born 1995) (Wesley Claudio Campos), Brazilian footballer
- Wesley (footballer, born April 1996) (Wesley Pionteck Souza), Brazilian footballer
- Wesley (footballer, born November 1996) (Wesley Moraes), Brazilian footballer
- Wesley (footballer, born 1999) (Wesley Ribeiro), Brazilian footballer
- Wesley (footballer, born April 2000) (Wesley Hudson da Silva), Brazilian footballer
- Wesley (footballer, born 2002) (Wesley Pombo), Brazilian footballer
- Wesley (footballer, born 2005) (Wesley Gassova), Brazilian footballer
- Wesley Addy (1913–1996), American actor
- Wesley Anderson (born 1969), American film director
- Wesley Augusto Henn Marth (born 2000), Brazilian football player
- Wesley Bailey (1808–1889), American newspaper editor and politician
- Wesley Bailey (American football) (born 2001), Canadian football player
- Wesley T. Bishop, American politician
- Wesley Bissainthe (born 2004), American football player
- Wesley Bryan, Professional golfer
- Wesley G. Bush (born 1961), American business executive
- Wesley Chesbro (born 1951), California Assemblyman and Senator
- Wesley Chu (born 1976), American science fiction writer
- Wesley Clark (born 1944), American military general, and politician
- Wesley Correira (born 1978), American mixed martial artist
- Wesley Cox (born 1955), American basketball player
- Wesley Craven (1939–2015), American filmmaker
- Wesley Gasolina (Wesley David de Oliveira Andrade, born 2000), Brazilian football player
- Wesley Duncan (born 1980), American politician
- Wesley Eure (born 1951), American actor
- Wesley Fofana (footballer) (born 2000), French footballer
- Wesley Fofana (rugby union) (born 1988), French rugby union player
- Wesley French (born 1996), American football player
- Wesley Henderson (born 1951), American architect, historian, and educator
- Wesley Huff (born 1991), Canadian apologist and public speaker
- Wesley Klein (born 1988), winner of the second series of Popstars (Netherlands)
- Wesley Korir (born 1982), Kenyan athlete and politician
- Wesley Matthews (born 1986), American basketball player
- Wesley Morgan (born 1990), Canadian actor and model
- Wesley Natã (born 1995), Brazilian footballer
- Wes Nelson (born 1998), English television personality and singer
- Wesley Pruden (1935–2019), American journalist
- Wesley Ira Purkey (1952–2020), American convicted murderer
- Wesley Santos (born 1991), Brazilian footballer
- Wesley Scantlin (born 1972), Guitarist and singer for Puddle Of Mudd
- Wesley Simms, co-founder of the Redfern All Blacks, an Indigenous Australian rugby league club
- Wesley Sneijder (born 1984), Dutch footballer
- Wesley Snipes (born 1962), American actor
- Wesley So (born 1993), Filipino chess player
- Wesley Somerville (born 1941), Northern Irish loyalist paramilitary
- Wesley Stromberg (born 1993), American musician, member of band Emblem3
- Wes Studi (born 1947), Native American actor and film producer
- Wesley Tann (1928–2012), American fashion designer
- Wesley Timoteo (born 2000), Canadian soccer player
- Wesley Willis (1963–2003), American cult musician and painter

== Fictional characters ==
- Wesley Dodds, the first of many DC Comics superheroes using the name Sandman
- Westley, from The Princess Bride, a 1973 novel and 1987 film
- Wesley "Wes" Collins, from Power Rangers Time Force
- Wesley Crusher, in the television series Star Trek: The Next Generation
- Wesley T. Owens, in the television series Mr. Belvedere
- Wesley Pegden, from Last of the Summer Wine
- Wesley Gibson, from the Millarworld series Wanted (and its film adaptation), Nemesis Reloaded, and Big Game
- Wesley Wyndam-Pryce, from the television series Angel, originally introduced in Buffy the Vampire Slayer
- Robert Wesley, in the Star Trek franchise

== See also ==
- Wesly, given name
- Wescley, given name
- Wes (given name)
- Westley (disambiguation)
- Wesley Brown (disambiguation)
- Charles Wesley (disambiguation)
- Samuel Wesley (disambiguation)
- Don Wesely (1954–2025), American politician, 49th mayor of Lincoln, Nebraska
