= Jo Anne Lyon =

American minister

Jo Anne Lyon (born 1940 in Blackwell, Oklahoma) is Ambassador and General Superintendent Emerita of the Wesleyan Church. Lyon was elected as the first woman General Superintendent at the June 2008 General Conference. In 2012 she was elected as the only General Superintendent of the denomination. Lyon was ordained as a minister in the Wesleyan Church in 1996 the same year that she founded World Hope International, an organization desiring to alleviate suffering and injustice through education, enterprise and community health.

Lyon holds a bachelor's degree in education from the University of Cincinnati, a Masters in Counseling from The University of Missouri-Kansas City and further graduate work at St. Louis University in Historical Theology. She has been awarded an honorary Doctor of Divinity from Northeastern Seminary and United Wesleyan College and an honorary Doctor of Humane Letters from both Southern Wesleyan University and Indiana Wesleyan University. She was interim president of Wesley Seminary.

She founded Word of Hope International in 1996 and served as its CEO and on its board of directors. Lyon has served on various boards including the National Association of Evangelicals Executive Committee, Christian Community Development Association, National Religious Partnership for the Environment, Asbury Theological Seminary Board, and Council on Faith of the World Economic Forum. She was the President of The United States Advisory Council on Faith-Based and Neighborhood Partnerships and an Ex-Officio member for all Wesleyan Institutions of Higher Education. She supports the Consistent Life Network. From 2016 to 2017, Lyon served as interim Vice President of Wesley Seminary in Marion, Indiana.

She has received various awards 2016 World Methodist Peace Award and National Immigration Forum 2017 Keeper of the American Dream Award, and participates in interfaith dialogues.

She has four children with her husband Rev. Wayne Lyon, and lives near Indianapolis.
