= Gareth Lee Cockerill =

- Born: 1944 (age 81–82)
- Occupation: New Testament Scholar
- Title: Professor of Biblical Interpretation and Theology
- Spouse: Rosa

Academic background
- Education: Southern Wesleyan University Asbury Theological Seminary
- Alma mater: Union Theological Seminary (Ph.D.)
- Thesis: (1976)

Academic work
- Discipline: Biblical studies
- Sub-discipline: New Testament studies
- Institutions: Wesley Biblical Seminary
- Main interests: The book of Hebrews, The doctrine of Revelation, Hermeneutics and cross-cultural interpretation, The relationship between the Old and New Testaments, Christianity and Islam
- Notable works: The Epistle to the Hebrews (NICNT)

Gareth Lee Cockerill (born in 1944) taught at Wesley Biblical Seminary from 1984 until 2017 where he held the post of Academic Dean and Professor of Biblical Interpretation and Theology. He is also an ordained minister in the Wesleyan Church. In the past he has served as a missionary in Sierra Leone, West Africa.

== Career ==
Cockerill was educated at Southern Wesleyan University (B.A.), Asbury Theological Seminary (M.Div.) and Union Theological Seminary (Th.M. & Ph.D.).

He has written a new volume on Hebrews in the New International Commentary on the New Testament series. Although replacing the classic commentary in that series by F. F. Bruce it has been well received by scholars and pastors alike. Other material by Cockerill include his Melchizedek without Speculation: Hebrews 7:1-25 and Genesis 14:17-24 and Guidebook for Pilgrims to the Heavenly City, Building Bridges or Syncretism: A Test Case each published in larger collections. He wrote Guidebook for Pilgrims to the Heavenly City in 2002.

Articles and book reviews has been written for the Tyndale Bulletin, Bulletin for Biblical Research, Journal of Biblical Literature, The Evangelical Quarterly, Journal of the Evangelical Theological Society, Interpretation, and Missiology. He remains interested in the book of Hebrews, revelation as doctrine, hermeneutics, cross-cultural interpretation and the relationship between the Old and New Testaments. In cross faith issues he studies the subject of Christianity and Islam.

== Personal ==
Cockerill preaches and teaches in churches and camps. The Cockerills have three adult daughters, two sons-in-law, and four grandchildren, one of which is named Samuel.

== Selected works ==
- Cockerill, Gareth Lee (2012). The Epistle to the Hebrews. New International Commentary on the New Testament. Grand Rapids: Eerdmans. ISBN 978-0-8028-2492-9.
- Cockerill, Gareth Lee (1999). Hebrews: A Commentary for Bible Students. Wesleyan Bible Study Commentary. Wesleyan Publishing House. ISBN 978-0-8982-7200-0.
- Cockerill, Gareth Lee (2013). Guidebook for Pilgrims to the Heavenly City. William Carey Library. ISBN 978-0-8780-8449-4.
