= Ken Schenck =

Dean and New Testament professor(born 1966)

Kenneth Schenck (born 1966) is a New Testament scholar whose primary focus has been the book of Hebrews, although he has also published on Paul, Philo, philosophy, and the New Testament in general. His New Testament Survey (Triangle Publishing) has sold over 10,000 copies, and his “brief guide” to Philo (Westminster John Knox) has been translated into Russian, Korean, and Hungarian. He has also written a philosophy textbook. His blog also engages heavily with issues in hermeneutics, ecclesiology, and philosophy on both a popular and scholarly level.

He taught philosophy and New Testament at Indiana Wesleyan University for 22 years (1997-2019). During that time he was also Dean of Wesley Seminary at Indiana Wesleyan University for six years (2009-2015) and Dean of the mostly undergraduate School of Theology and Ministry for three years (2016-2019). Then in 2019 he went to Houghton College to become Vice President for Planning and Innovation.

== Education ==
Schenck was awarded a PhD degree in 1996 from the University of Durham, England, where he studied under James D. G. Dunn, holds an MA degree in Classical Languages and Literature from the University of Kentucky, an MDiv degree from Asbury Theological Seminary, and an AB degree from Southern Wesleyan University. He is an ordained minister in the Wesleyan Church since 1991 and a Professor of Bible at Indiana Wesleyan University since 1997. He has also taught for the University of Notre Dame and Asbury Theological Seminary.

== Scholarship ==
His work on Hebrews was the first to engage the book extensively from the standpoint of its narrative substructure, and is part of a recent wave that sees the sermon more as a response to the destruction of the Jerusalem temple than a polemic against the Levitical cultus per se.

In hermeneutics, Schenck has argued consistently that the traditionally Protestant approach to Scripture, which places the locus of the Bible's authority solely on the historical meaning, deconstructs itself not only because it leads to an atomization of biblical meaning but also because the Bible itself—the putative authority—does not employ this method. The ironic result is a trajectory toward theological liberalism and away from Christian orthodoxy, as well as the fragmentation of Protestantism. Schenck maintains that only a balance between the trajectory of the historical meaning and the Spirit-led consensus of Christendom can sustain both orthodox Christian faith and an understanding of the Bible as Christian Scripture.

== Publications ==
- "A New Perspective on Hebrews: Rethinking the Parting of the Ways" (Lantham, MD: Lexington, 2019).
- "Hebrews: One Book" (Nashville: Seedbed, 2018).
- "Our Future: Bible Study on Revelation" (Indianapolis: Wesleyan Publishing House, 2015).
- "Our Walk: Bible Study on James" (Indianapolis: Wesleyan Publishing House, 2015).
- "The Early Church: Letters to the Body of Christ" (Indianapolis: Wesleyan Publishing House, 2015).
- "Our Mission: Bible Study on Acts 13-28" (Indianapolis: Wesleyan Publishing House, 2015).
- "Our Foundation: Bible Study on Acts 1-12" (Indianapolis: Wesleyan Publishing House, 2015).
- "The Early Church: Reaching the World" (Indianapolis: Wesleyan Publishing House, 2015).
- "A Christian Philosophical Journey" (Marion, IN: Triangle, 2014).
- "The Wisdom of Jesus: Bible Study on the Sermon on the Mount" (Indianapolis: Wesleyan Publishing House, 2014).
- "The Witness of Jesus: Bible Study on the Gospel of John (Indianapolis: Wesleyan Publishing House, 2014).
- "Jesus: Portraits in the Gospels" (Indianapolis: Wesleyan Publishing House, 2013).
- "The Parables of Jesus: Bible Study" (Indianapolis: Wesleyan Publishing House, 2013).
- "The Passion of Jesus: Bible Study on Mark's Passion" (Indianapolis: Wesleyan Publishing House, 2013).
- "Jesus: The Mission" (Indianapolis: Wesleyan Publishing House, 2013).
- "Our Faith: 1 & 2 Timothy, Titus" (Indianapolis: Wesleyan Publishing House, 2012).
- "Our Purpose: Ephesians and Colossians" (Indianapolis: Wesleyan Publishing House, 2012).
- "Paul: Prisoner of Hope" (Prison and Pastoral Letters) (Indianapolis: Wesleyan Publishing House, 2012).
- "Our Righteousness: Romans 1-8" (Soldier of Peace Bible Study) (Indianapolis: Wesleyan Publishing House, 2011)
- "Our Relationships: Romans 9-16" (Soldier of Peace Bible Study) (Indianapolis: Wesleyan Publishing House, 2011).
- "Paul: Soldier of Peace" (Romans) (Indianapolis: Wesleyan Publishing House, 2011).
- "Our Hope: 1 Thessalonians" (Messenger of Grace Bible Study) (Indianapolis: Wesleyan Publishing House, 2010).
- "Our Joy: Philippians" (Messenger of Grace Bible Study) (Indianapolis: Wesleyan Publishing House, 2010).
- "Paul: Messenger of Grace" (Paul's Early Letters) (Indianapolis: Wesleyan Publishing House, 2010).
- "God Has Spoken: Hebrews’s Theology of the Scriptures," The Epistle to the Hebrews and Christian Theology, Richard Bauckham, Daniel R. Driver, Trevor A. Hart, and Nathan MacDonald, eds. (Grand Rapids: Eerdmans, 2009), 321-36.
- "The Unity and Coherence of Scripture," in Treasure the Word, J. Coleson, ed. (Indianapolis: Wesleyan Publishing House, 2009), 63-75.
- Making Sense of God’s Word (Indianapolis: Wesleyan Publishing House, 2009).
- God’s Plan Fulfilled (Indianapolis: Wesleyan Publishing House, 2009).
- "2 Corinthians 4:13 and the pi/stij Xristou= Debate," CBQ (2008): 524-37.
- A Brief Guide to Biblical Interpretation (Triangle, 2008).
- Review of Torrey Seland's, Strangers in the Light: Philonic Perspectives on Christian Identity in 1 Peter (Leiden: Brill, 2005), published in SPhA 20 (2008): 230-33.
- Cosmology and Eschatology in Hebrews: The Setting of the Sacrifice (Cambridge University, 2007).
- "The Levitical Cultus and the Partitioning of the Ways in Hebrews," presented at the Jewish Christianity Group at SBL, Fall 2007.
- "The Spirit Directed Church," The Church That Jesus Builds (Indianapolis: Wesleyan Publishing House, 2007) 151-62.
- 1 and 2 Corinthians, Wesleyan Biblical Commentary Series (Wesleyan Publishing House, 2006) (popular commentary for the church).
- "God Has Spoken: Hebrews’ Theology of Scripture," presented at the Hebrews and Theology Conference at St. Andrews, July 2006.
- "The Table of Inspiration – Interpreting the Bible," in Passion, Power, and Purpose: Essays on the Art of Contemporary Preaching (Indianapolis: Wesleyan Publishing House, 2006), 95-109.
- "The Tale of the Shipwreck," presented at the "Formation of Luke-Acts" Section at SBL, Fall 2006.
- "An Archaeology of Hebrews Tabernacle Metaphor, "delivered to the Hebrews Consultation of SBL, Fall, 2005.
- "Hebrews and Hermeneutics: The State of the Question," delivered to the Hebrews Consultation of SBL, Fall, 2005.
- Review of Daniel J. Harrington's What Are They Saying about the Letter to the Hebrews? (New York: Paulist Press, 1989), published in BTB 36 (2006): 137-38.
- A Brief Guide to Philo (Westminster John Knox, 2005).
- "Superman: A Popular Culture Messiah," in The Gospel According to Superheroes: Religion and Popular Culture (New York: Peter Lang, 2005), 33-48.
- Review of Wilfried Eisele's, Ein unerschütterliches Reich: Die mittelplatonische Umformung des Parusiegedankens im Hebräerbrief (BZNW 116; Berlin: de Gruyter, 2003), published in CBQ 67 (2005): 140-41.
- "Leben nach dem Tod," delivered to the evangelisch-methodistische Seminar in Reutligen, Germany (2004)
- "From Enoch to the Scrolls," delivered Winter 2004 to the Kolloquium für Graduierte, Tübingen, Germany
- "From Sirach to the Sadducees," delivered Winter 2004 to the Kolloquium für Graduierte, Tübingen, Germany
- Why Wesleyans Favor Women in Ministry (Wesleyan Publishing House, 2004).
- Jesus is Lord: An Introduction to the New Testament (Triangle, 2003).
- Understanding the Book of Hebrews (Westminster John Knox, 2003).
- "Philo and the Epistle to the Hebrews: Ronald Williamson’s Study after Thirty Years," Studia Philonica Annual 14 (2002): 112-35.
- "A Celebration of the Enthroned Son: The Catena of Hebrews 1," JBL 120 (2001) 469-485.
- "Jesus and Essene Views of the Afterlife: Common Ground between the Historical Jesus and Qumran?"—paper delivered at the International Conference on the Dead Sea Scrolls at the University of St. Andrews, Summer, 2001
- "Philo and the Epistle to the Hebrews: Ronald Williamson’s Study after Thirty Years"—read at SBL Philo of Alexandria Group, Fall ’00
- "Q and the Merging of Jewish Traditions Concerning the Afterlife"—read at SBL Q Section, Fall ’00
- "Whoever Loses their Life Will Find It: Resurrection and the Historical Jesus"—read at SBL Historical Jesus Section, Fall ’99
- "Keeping His Appointment: Creation and Enthronement in the Epistle to the Hebrews," JSNT 66 (1997) 91-117.
- "Did Hebrews Know the Book of Wisdom?"—read at British New Testament Conference, Summer ’95
