= Wesleyan (disambiguation) =

A Wesleyan is any person who adopts the principles of Wesleyan theology or Wesleyanism.

Wesleyan may also refer to:

- Wesleyan University or one of the many universities and liberal arts colleges named after John Wesley
  - Wesleyan University Press, a university press
- Wesley College (disambiguation), a number of educational institutions worldwide
- The theological emphasis on sanctification, characteristic of the holiness movement of which Wesley was part
- The Wesleyan Church split from the Methodist Episcopal Church in 1843
- Wesleyan Methodist Church (Great Britain)
  - The Wesleyan Assurance Society, a large financial services company originally founded by the Wesleyan Methodist Church in 1841
- Many other churches bear the name of Wesleyan Church. See Wesleyan Church (disambiguation)

The term is also used as a general synonym for Methodist.
