= Gordon Fee =

American-Canadian Christian theologian (1934–2022)

- Born: Gordon Donald Fee; May 23, 1934; Ashland, Oregon, U.S.
- Died: October 25, 2022 (aged 88); New York City, U.S.
- Occupation: Christian theologian
- Known for: Pneumatology and textual criticism of the New Testament
- Parent(s): Donald Horace Fee and Gracy Irene Jacobson

Academic background
- Education: University of Southern California; Seattle Pacific University

Academic work
- Discipline: New Testament studies
- School or tradition: Pentecostal
- Notable works: The First Epistle to the Corinthians (NICNT); Paul's Letter to the Philippians (NICNT); The First and Second Letter to the Thessalonians; How to Read the Bible for All Its Worth
- Notable ideas: Western text-type in sections of Gospel of John

Gordon Donald Fee (May 23, 1934 – October 25, 2022) was an American-Canadian Christian Pentecostal theologian who was an ordained minister of the Assemblies of God (USA). He was professor of New Testament Studies at Regent College in Vancouver, British Columbia, Canada.

== Biography ==
Fee was born in 1934 in Ashland, Oregon, to Donald Horace Fee (1907–1999) and Gracy Irene Jacobson (1906–1979). His father was an Assemblies of God minister who pastored several churches in Washington state. Fee received his BA and MA degrees from Seattle Pacific University and his PhD from the University of Southern California where he wrote his dissertation on the Papyrus 66. On April 21, 2010, Fee was awarded an honorary Doctor of Divinity degree from Northwest University in Kirkland, Washington, where Fee had taught in the past and where a building is named for his father, Donald Fee. After teaching briefly at Wheaton College in Illinois and for several years at Vanguard University of Southern California, Fee taught at Gordon-Conwell Theological Seminary in South Hamilton, Massachusetts, from fall 1974 until 1986. He then moved to Regent College where he was Professor of New Testament until his retirement in 2009.

Fee was considered a leading expert in pneumatology and textual criticism of the New Testament. He was also the author of books on biblical exegesis, including the popular introductory work How to Read the Bible for All Its Worth (co-authored with Douglas Stuart), the "sequel," How to Read the Bible, Book by Book, How to Choose a Translation for all its Worth (co-authored with Mark L. Strauss), and a major commentary on 1 Corinthians, as well as numerous other commentaries on various books in the New Testament. In the 1990s, he succeeded F.F. Bruce to become the editor of the notable evangelical commentary series, the New International Commentary on the New Testament of which his commentaries on 1 Corinthians and Philippians are a part.

Fee was a member of the CBT (Committee on Bible Translation) that translated the New International Version (NIV) and its revision, the Today's New International Version (TNIV). He also served on the advisory board of the International Institute for Christian Studies.

He discovered that Codex Sinaiticus in Gospel of John 1:1–8:38 and in some other parts of this Gospel does not represent the Alexandrian text-type but the Western text-type.

In 2012, Fee announced that he was retiring as general editor of the New International Commentary on the New Testament series due to the fact that he had been diagnosed with Alzheimer's disease. He died on October 25, 2022, at his home in New York City, aged 88.

== Views ==
=== Christian egalitarianism ===
Fee was a Christian egalitarian and was a contributing editor to the key Christian egalitarian book Discovering Biblical Equality: Complementarity without hierarchy (2004). His above mentioned commentary consistently translates the generic "men" as "men and women" with an explanatory footnote. He was also a member of the board of reference for Christians for Biblical Equality, a group of Evangelical Christians who believe the Bible teaches complete equality between men and women and that all Christians, regardless of gender "must exercise their God-given gifts with equal authority and equal responsibility in church, home and world".

=== Pentecostal distinctives ===
Fee was a Pentecostal; nevertheless, he disagreed with some long held and deeply cherished Pentecostal beliefs. Specifically, he questioned article 7 of the Assemblies of God Statement of Fundamental Truths, which articulates a classical Pentecostal understanding of baptism in the Holy Spirit as subsequent to and separate from Christian conversion. In "Baptism in the Holy Spirit: The Issue of Separability and Subsequence", Fee writes that there is little biblical evidence to prove the traditional Pentecostal doctrinal position.

On the other hand, he maintained that "the Pentecostal experience itself can be defended on exegetical grounds as a thoroughly biblical phenomenon". Fee believed that in the early church, the Pentecostal experience was an expected part of conversion:

The crucial item in all this for the early church was the work of the Spirit; and [the empowerment for life], the dynamic empowering dimension with gifts, miracles, and evangelism (along with fruit and growth), was a normal part of their expectation and experience.

Fee believed the Spirit's empowerment is a necessary element in the life of the Church that has too often been neglected. It is this neglect, Fee argued, that led early Pentecostals to seek the presence and power of the Spirit in experiences which they identified as baptism in the Holy Spirit.

=== Opposition to prosperity theology ===
Fee was a strong opponent of the prosperity gospel and published a 1985 book entitled The Disease of the Health and Wealth Gospels.

== Works ==
=== Books ===
- Fee, Gordon D. (1981). How to Read the Bible for all its Worth. Grand Rapids, MI: Zondervan. ISBN 978-0-310-37361-2. OCLC 8113186.
- ——— (1984). 1 and 2 Timothy, Titus. A Good News Commentary. San Francisco: Harper & Row. ISBN 0-06-062338-1.
- ——— (1987). The First Epistle to the Corinthians. NICNT. Grand Rapids, MI: Eerdmans. ISBN 978-0-8028-2507-0.
- ——— (1988). 1 and 2 Timothy, Titus. New International Biblical Commentary. Vol. 13. Peabody, MA: Hendrickson Publishers. ISBN 978-0-943-57510-0. OCLC 19783316.
- ——— (1991). Gospel and Spirit: issues in New Testament hermeneutics. Peabody, MA: Hendrickson Publishers. ISBN 978-0-943-57578-0. OCLC 24380526.
- ——— (1994). God's Empowering Presence: The Holy Spirit in the Letters of Paul. Peabody, MA: Hendrickson Publishers. ISBN 978-0-943-57594-0. OCLC 29358996.
- ——— (1995). Paul's Letter to the Philippians. NICNT. Grand Rapids, MI: Eerdmans. ISBN 978-0-8028-2511-7. OCLC 32465463.
- ———; Stuart, Douglas K. (2002). How to Read the Bible Book by Book: a guided tour. Grand Rapids, MI: Zondervan. ISBN 978-0-310-21118-1. OCLC 48428856.
- ———; Pierce, Ronald W.; Groothuis, Rebecca Merrill (2004). Discovering Biblical Equality: complementarity without hierarchy. Downers Grove, IL: InterVarsity Press. ISBN 978-0-830-82729-9. OCLC 56085678.
- ——— (2006). The Disease of the Health & Wealth Gospels. Vancouver, Canada: Regent College Pub. ISBN 9781573830669.
- ——— (2007). Pauline Christology: An Exegetical-Theological Study. Grand Rapids, MI: Baker Academic. ISBN 978-1-598-56035-0. OCLC 71266373.
- ——— (2009). The First and Second Letter to the Thessalonians. NICNT. Grand Rapids, MI: Eerdmans. ISBN 978-0-802-86362-1. OCLC 317118158.
- ——— (2011). Revelation: A New Covenant Commentary. New Covenant Commentary Series. Vol. 18. Eugene, OR: Cascade Books. ISBN 978-1-608-99431-1. OCLC 671260665.
- ——— (2018). Jesus the Lord according to Paul the Apostle: A Concise Introduction. Baker Academic. ISBN 978-0801049828.

=== As editor ===
- ———; Epp, Eldon Jay, eds. (1981). New Testament Textual Criticism: its significance for exegesis: essays in honour of Bruce M. Metzger. Oxford; New York: Clarendon Press; Oxford University Press. ISBN 978-0-198-26175-9. OCLC 5800094.

=== Articles ===
- ——— (October 1982). "On the Inauthenticity of John 5:3b-4". The Evangelical Quarterly. 54 (4): 207–218. doi:10.1163/27725472-05404002.
- ——— (1988). "To What End Exegesis? Reflections on Exegesis and Spirituality in Philippians 4:10-20" (PDF). Bulletin for Biblical Research. 8: 75–88.
- ——— (1992). "Philippians 2:5–11: Hymn or Exalted Pauline Prose?". Bulletin for Biblical Research. 2: 29–46. doi:10.2307/26422113. JSTOR 26422113.
