= Wess (disambiguation) =

Wess (1945–2009) was an American-born Italian singer and bass guitarist.

Wess or Weß may also refer to:

== People ==
=== Given name ===
- A. Wess Mitchell (born 1977), American policy analyst and diplomat
- Wess Morgan (born 1973), American gospel musician and pastor
- Wess Stafford (born 1949), American nonprofit executive and CEO of Compassion International

=== Surname ===
- Benjamin Weß (born 1985), German field hockey player, brother of Timo Weß
- Claudia Wess (born 1995), Austrian handball player
- Frank Wess (1922–2013), American saxophonist and flutist
- Julius Wess (1934–2007), Austrian theoretical physicist
- Timo Weß (born 1982), German field hockey player, brother of Benjamin Weß
- Woolf Wess (1861–1946), British anarchist

== Other uses ==
- WESS, student radio station of East Stroudsburg University of Pennsylvania
- Wess, teacher in the 2006 video game Mother 3

== See also ==
- Wes (disambiguation)
