= Wesleyan Society =

Wesleyan Society may refer to:

- Wesleyan Assurance Society
- Wesleyan Philosophical Society
- Fundamental Wesleyan Society

== See also ==
- Wesley Historical Society
