= Wesleyan Seminary =

Wesleyan Seminary may refer to:

- Albion College (formerly Wesleyan Seminary) in Albion, Michigan
- Genesee Wesleyan Seminary in Lima, New York
- Gouverneur Wesleyan Seminary in St. Lawrence County, New York
- Wesley Seminary in Marion, Indiana
- Wilbraham Wesleyan Academy in Wilbraham, Massachusetts
