= Wesley Chapel =

Wesley Chapel may refer to:

== United States ==
- Wesley Chapel (Woodlawn, Arkansas), listed on the NRHP in Arkansas
- Wesley Chapel, Florida, cdp 20 miles north of Downtown Tampa
- Wesley Chapel Methodist Episcopal Church (Eldersburg, Maryland), listed on the NRHP in Maryland
- Wesley Chapel, North Carolina
- Wesley Chapel (Cincinnati), Ohio, a former church
- Wesley Chapel (Hilliard, Ohio), listed on the NRHP in Ohio
- Wesley Chapel (Hopetown, Ohio), listed on the NRHP in Ohio
- Broad Street Church of Christ (now Wesley Chapel), listed on the NRHP in Cookeville, Tennessee
- Wesley Chapel, Texas, Houston County, Texas
- Wesley Chapel A.M.E Church, Georgetown, Texas, listed on the NRHP

== United Kingdom ==
- Wesley Chapel, Harrogate, North Yorkshire, England
- Wesley Chapel, Priory Street, in York, in England

== See also ==
- Wesley's Chapel, London, England
- Wesley Methodist Church (disambiguation)
