= Westley =

Westley may refer to:

== People ==
- Westley Allan Dodd (1961–1993), American serial killer
- Westley Sissel Unseld (1946–2020), American professional basketball player, coach and executive
- William Westley Guth (1871–1929), American attorney, Methodist minister, and academic
- William Westley Richards (1789–1865), British firearms manufacturer
- David Westley (born 1974), former professional rugby league footballer
- Graham Westley (born 1968), English football manager and former player
- John Westley (b. 1927), American biochemist
- Tom Westley (born 1989), English professional cricketer
- Westley Moore (born 1978), American politician, banker, and author

== Places ==
- Westley Waterless, a small village and civil parish in East Cambridgeshire, England
- Westley, California, a census-designated place in Stanislaus County, California
- Westley, Suffolk, a village and civil parish in the St Edmundsbury district of Suffolk in eastern England

== Fictional characters ==
- Westley, a character from the 1973 fantasy romance novel The Princess Bride by William Goldman and the 1987 film adaptation

== See also ==
- Westleigh (disambiguation)
- Wesley (disambiguation)
- Wes (disambiguation)
