= Wes (given name) =

Wes is a common English given name, often a diminutive for Wesley or Weston. It may refer to:

== People ==
- Wes Anderson (born 1969), American film producer, director and screenwriter
- Wes Barker (born 1986), Canadian magician and YouTuber
- Wes Bentley (born 1978), American actor
- Wes Borland (born 1975), American rock guitarist
- Wes Brisco (born 1983), American professional wrestler
- Wes Brown (born 1979), English footballer
- Wes Butters (born 1979), former BBC Radio 1 disc jockey
- Wes Chandler (born 1956), American former National Football League player
- Wes Craven (1939–2015), American film director, writer, producer and actor
- Wes Enos, American politician
- Wes Green (born 1982), Australian lacrosse player
- Wes Hills (born 1995), American football player
- Wes Hodges (born 1984), American baseball player
- Wes Johnson (born 1961), American actor
- Wes Madiko (1964–2021), Cameroonian musician
- Wes Malott (born 1976), American professional ten-pin bowler
- Wes Martin (born 1996), American football player
- Wes McCauley (born 1972), National Hockey League referee
- Wes Montgomery (1923–1968), jazz guitarist
- Wes Moore (born 1978), American politician, banker, and author
- Wes Morgan (born 1984), Jamaican footballer
- Wes Naiqama (born 1982), Australian-Fijian rugby league player
- Wes Nelson (born 1998), English television personality and singer
- Wes Saxton (born 1993), American football player
- Wes Scantlin (born 1972), American rock musician
- Wes Sims (born 1979), American mixed martial artist
- Wes Studi (born 1947), Native American actor
- Wes Takahashi, American animator and visual effects supervisor
- Wes Unseld (1946–2020), American basketball player, head coach and executive
- Wes Unseld Jr., American basketball coach
- Wes Welker (born 1981), American National Football League player
- Wes Wessberg (1939–2024), American cyclist
- Wes Westmoreland (born 1964), American businessman and politician
- Wes Westrum (1922–2002), American baseball player, coach, manager, and scout
- Wes Whisler (born 1983), American baseball player
- Wes Whitead (1933–2024), American politician
- Wes Wilkinson (born 1984), English footballer
- Wes Wilson (1937–2020), American artist
- Wes Wise (1928–2022), American journalist and politician

== Fictional characters ==
- Wesley Crusher, in the television series Star Trek: The Next Generation
- Wes (Sesame Street), a Sesame Street Muppet character

== See also ==
- Wes (disambiguation)
- Wesley (name), given name and surname
