= Wesley House (disambiguation) =

Wesley House is a seminary in Cambridge.

Wesley House may also refer to:

== Australia ==
- Wesley House, an Australian theological institution at, or renamed as, Wesley Theological College

== United Kingdom ==
- Charles Wesley's House, an 18th-century house in Bristol
- John Wesley's House, an 18th-century house adjacent to Wesley's Chapel in London
- Wesley House, Leatherhead, the 20th-century former offices of Leatherhead Urban District Council

== United States ==
- William S. Simmons Plantation, also known as Wesley House, listed on the National Register of Historic Places (NRHP) in Georgia
- Wesley House (Houma, Louisiana), listed on the NRHP in Louisiana
- Wesley House in Eden Gardens State Park, Florida
