= Charles Wesley (disambiguation) =

Charles Wesley (1707–1788) was an English Methodist leader.

Charles Wesley may also refer to:

- Charles Wesley junior (1757–1834), English organist and composer, his son
- Charles H. Wesley (1891–1987), American historian and writer
- Charles Wesley (baseball) (1896–1944), American baseball player
