= Weslley =

Weslley may refer to:

- Weslley (footballer, born 1982), full name Weslley Morais Sousa, Brazilian football midfielder
- Weslley (footballer, born January 1992), full name Weslley Silva Santos Rodrigues, Brazilian football defender
- Weslley (footballer, born April 1992), full name Weslley Smith Alves Feitosa, Brazilian football forward

== See also ==
- Wesley (disambiguation)
