= Wesleyan Church (disambiguation) =

The Wesleyan Church is a Methodist Christian denomination aligned with the holiness movement.

Wesleyan Church may also refer to:

- Wesleyan Methodist Church of Australia, the Australian branch of the Wesleyan Church

== Denominations ==
- Allegheny Wesleyan Methodist Connection, a Methodist denomination based in the United States
- Evangelical Wesleyan Church, a Methodist denomination based in the United States
- Free Wesleyan Church of Tonga, the largest Methodist denomination in Tonga
- Wesleyan Methodist Church (Great Britain), the original British Methodist grouping, which merged into the Methodist Church of Great Britain in 1932
- Methodist Church of Great Britain; the successor to the Wesleyan Methodist Church in Great Britain after the Methodist Union of 1932
- Wesleyan Methodist Church (United States), a historic American denomination, which merged into the Wesleyan Church

== Individual churches ==
- Wesleyan Methodist Church, Coburg, Victoria, Australia
- Wesleyan Methodist Church (Seneca Falls, New York)
- Wesleyan Methodist Church (Weybridge, Vermont)
- Skyline Church, a megachurch in La Mesa, California, associated with The Wesleyan Church

== See also ==
- List of Methodist churches
- List of Methodist denominations
- Wesleyan (disambiguation)
- Methodism
