= Westleigh =

Westleigh can refer to:

== Places ==
- Westleigh, Mid Devon, England
- Westleigh, North Devon, England
- Westleigh, Greater Manchester, England
- Westleigh, New South Wales, Australia

== Other uses ==
- Westleigh railway station, Greater Manchester, England

== See also ==
- West Leigh, Albemarle County, Virginia, United States
- Westley (disambiguation)
