= Norval Geldenhuys =

South African minister (1918–1964)

Johannes Norval Geldenhuys (18 February 1918 – 22 July 1964) was a South African minister and Bible commentator. He studied at the University of Pretoria and Princeton Theological Seminary and was a minister of the Dutch Reformed Church in South Africa.

Geldenhuys is best known for his 1950 commentary on Luke, which became the first volume published in the New International Commentary on the New Testament series. F. F. Bruce noted that practically every page of the commentary revealed Geldenhuys to be a "preacher, pastor, and theologian."
