= Wescley =

Wescley is a given name. Notable people with the name include:

- Wescley (footballer, born 1984), Brazilian football centre-back
- Wescley (footballer, born 1991), Brazilian football attacking midfielder

== See also ==
- Wesley (disambiguation)
