= Hopetown, Ohio =

Unincorporated community in Ohio, U.S.

Coordinates: 39°22′43″N 82°58′31″W

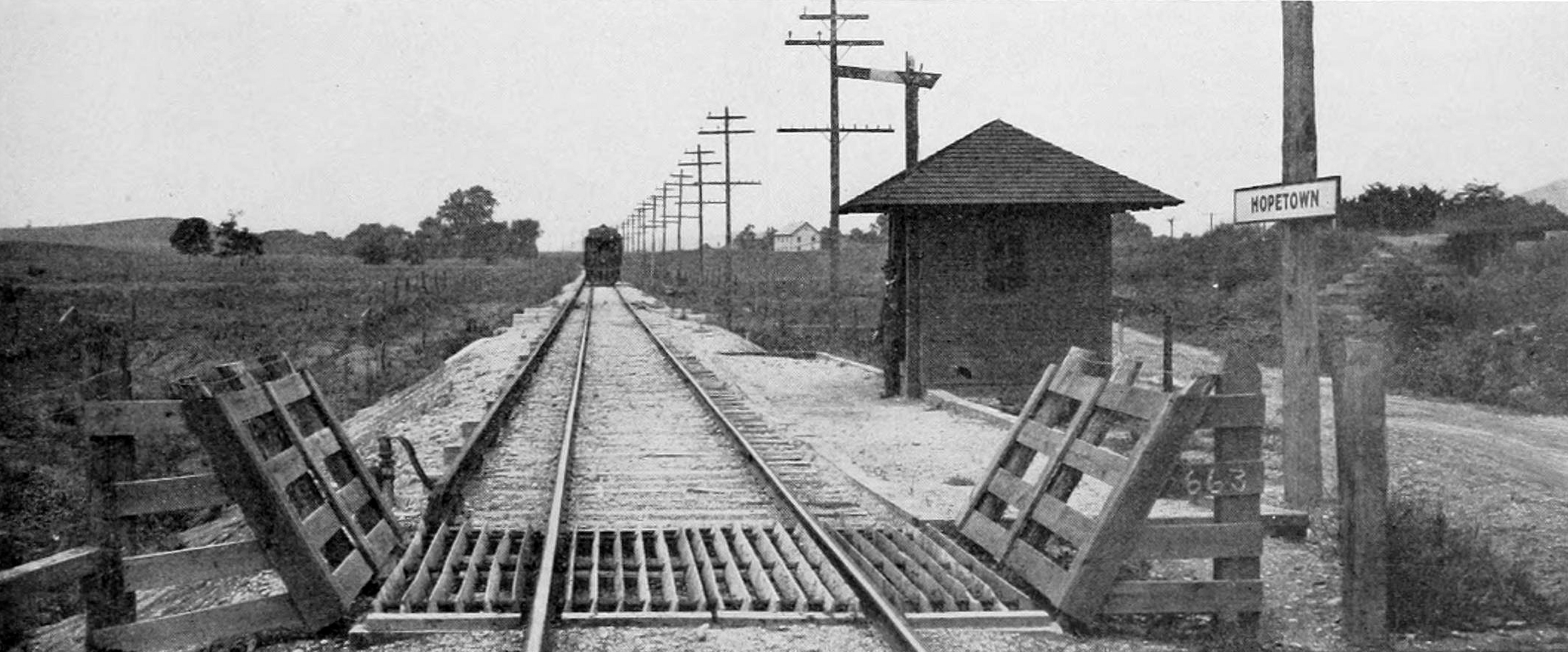
Hopetown, 1906

Hopetown is an unincorporated community in Ross County, in the U.S. state of Ohio.

== History ==
Hopetown was originally called Hope, and under the latter name was laid out in 1819. The community took its name from the Hope Mill, a gristmill near the original town site. A post office called Hopetown was established in 1900 and was discontinued that same year.

Wesley Chapel in Hopetown is listed on the National Register of Historic Places.
