= Wesly =

Wesly is a given name. Notable people with the name include:

- Wesly Decas (born 1999), Honduran footballer
- Wesly Felix (born 1947), Haitian boxer
- Wesly Mallard (born 1978), American football player

== See also ==
- Wesley (disambiguation)
