= Tadala Kandulu Ngosi =

Malawian tennis player

- Born: March 21, 1990 (age 36)
- Citizenship: Malawian
- Education: Southern Wesleyan University, University of Malawi
- Occupations: Youth development advocate, nonprofit executive, former tennis player
- Organization: MATCH Foundation
- Known for: Tennis and youth development
- Title: Founder and executive director

Tadala Kandulu Ngosi is a Malawian former national tennis champion and youth development advocate. She is the founder and executive director of MATCH Foundation, a Lilongwe-based non-profit organisation that combines education and sport to support children and young people in Malawi.

== Early life and education ==
Ngosi was born and grew up in Blantyre in Southern Malawi. She began playing tennis at the age of twelve, she is the youngest of four children. She became the youngest winner of the Malawi Open championship at fourteen and later represented Malawi in international competitions. She went on to become a five time Malawian national tennis champion.

She attended Our Lady of Wisdom Secondary School. After secondary school she was selected to pursue a Bachelor of Arts in Media for Development at the University of Malawi. Her tennis career led to an NCAA athletic scholarship at Southern Wesleyan University in the United States where she studied economics and competed in collegiate tennis. During her studies at Wesleyan she also worked as a sponsorship and development intern.She later studied development studies at the University of Malawi.

== Career ==
Ngosi has said that her experiences of limited educational and sporting opportunities in Malawi, followed by exposure to better resourced facilities in the United States, motivated her to create opportunities for young Malawians. She founded MATCH Foundation in Lilongwe to use education and sport as tools for youth development.

The Foundation describes itself as a sport for development organisations whose programs include after school learning, sport, leadership training, school and sports-infrastructure development, and initiatives intended to keep girls in school. In June 2025, MATCH Foundation organised a junior tennis championship at Lilongwe Golf Club involving under-14 and under-16 players from Lilongwe, Ntcheu and Blantyre. At the tournament, Ngosi called for greater investment in tennis and more opportunities for young players to participate competitions. Match Foundation also partners with Malawian agricultural organisation ACADES on a youth entrepreneurship programme.

In March 2026, Ngosi supported the Ministry of Youth, sports and Culture's review of Malawi's National Sports Policy and argued that the revised policy should address mental health and youth policy.

== Recognition ==
Ngosi has received Malawi's National Youth SDG Award and a National Youth Impact and Leadership Award.

She was selected for the Aspire Leadership Programme run by AL for Education.
