= Douglas Stuart (biblical scholar) =

Douglas K. Stuart
- Born: February 8, 1943 (age 83)
- Occupation: Teacher
- Title: Professor of Old Testament at Gordon-Conwell Theological Seminary
- Spouse: Gayle (Johnson) Stuart

Academic background
- Education: B.A. (Harvard University) Postgraduate study Yale Divinity School Ph.D. (Harvard University)

Douglas K. Stuart (born February 8, 1943) is Professor of Old Testament at Gordon-Conwell Theological Seminary, an interdenominational evangelical seminary.

== Life ==
Stuart received his B.A. magna cum laude from Harvard College in 1964, spent two years at Yale Divinity School, and in 1971 received his PhD in Near Eastern Languages and Literature from Harvard University, on meter in Hebrew Poetry.

He also served as the senior pastor of the Linebrook Church of Ipswich, Massachusetts, and was the former senior pastor of Boxford's First Congregational Church. He is the father of eight grown children, four of which he and his wife adopted. He currently resides in Bradford, Massachusetts and watches over two tree farms in Farmington, New Hampshire.

== Writings ==
His books include How to Read the Bible for All Its Worth, and How to Read the Bible Book-By-Book (both of which he co-authored with New Testament scholar and then fellow Gordon-Conwell professor Gordon Fee); Old Testament Exegesis: A Primer for Students and Pastors; Hosea-Jonah (Word Biblical Commentary); and Exodus (New American Commentary). His articles have appeared in such publications as Christianity Today and Decision magazine. He has been quoted in Time magazine, and also has appeared in the television series Mysteries of the Bible and Christianity: The First Thousand Years.
