= Samuel Wesley =

Samuel Wesley may refer to:

- Samuel Wesley (poet, died 1735) (1662–1735), English poet and churchman
- Samuel Wesley (poet, died 1739) (1691–1739), English poet and churchman, son of the above
- Samuel Wesley (composer, born 1766) (1766–1837), English organist and composer, grandson of Samuel Wesley (1662–1735)
- Samuel Sebastian Wesley (1810–1876), English organist and composer, son of the above
- Sir Samuel Robert Wesley (died 1877), Royal Marines general
