= Wesley Chapel (Hopetown, Ohio) =

Historic church in Ohio, United States

- U.S. National Register of Historic Places
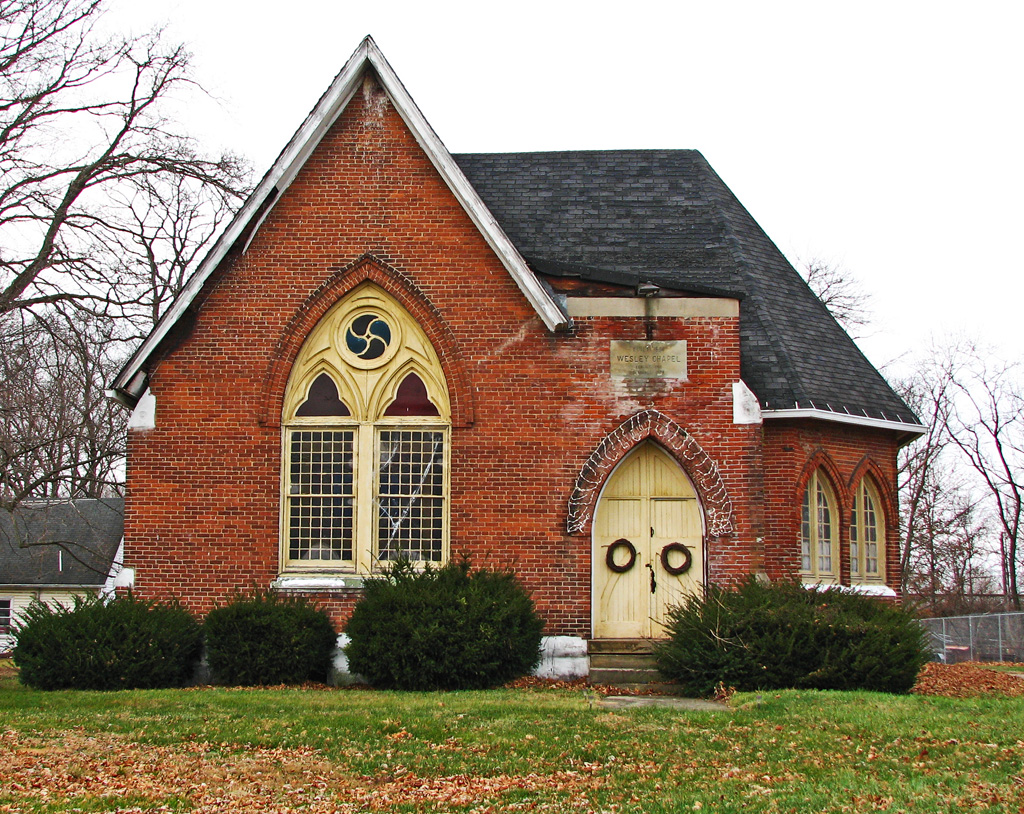
- Front of the church

- Location within Ohio Location within the United States
- Location: Off U.S. Route 23 at Hopetown, Ohio
- Coordinates: 39°22′40″N 82°58′22″W
- Area: 1 acre (0.40 ha)
- Built: 1834
- Architectural style: Gothic, High Victorian Gothic
- NRHP reference No.: 79001936
- Added to NRHP: February 2, 1979

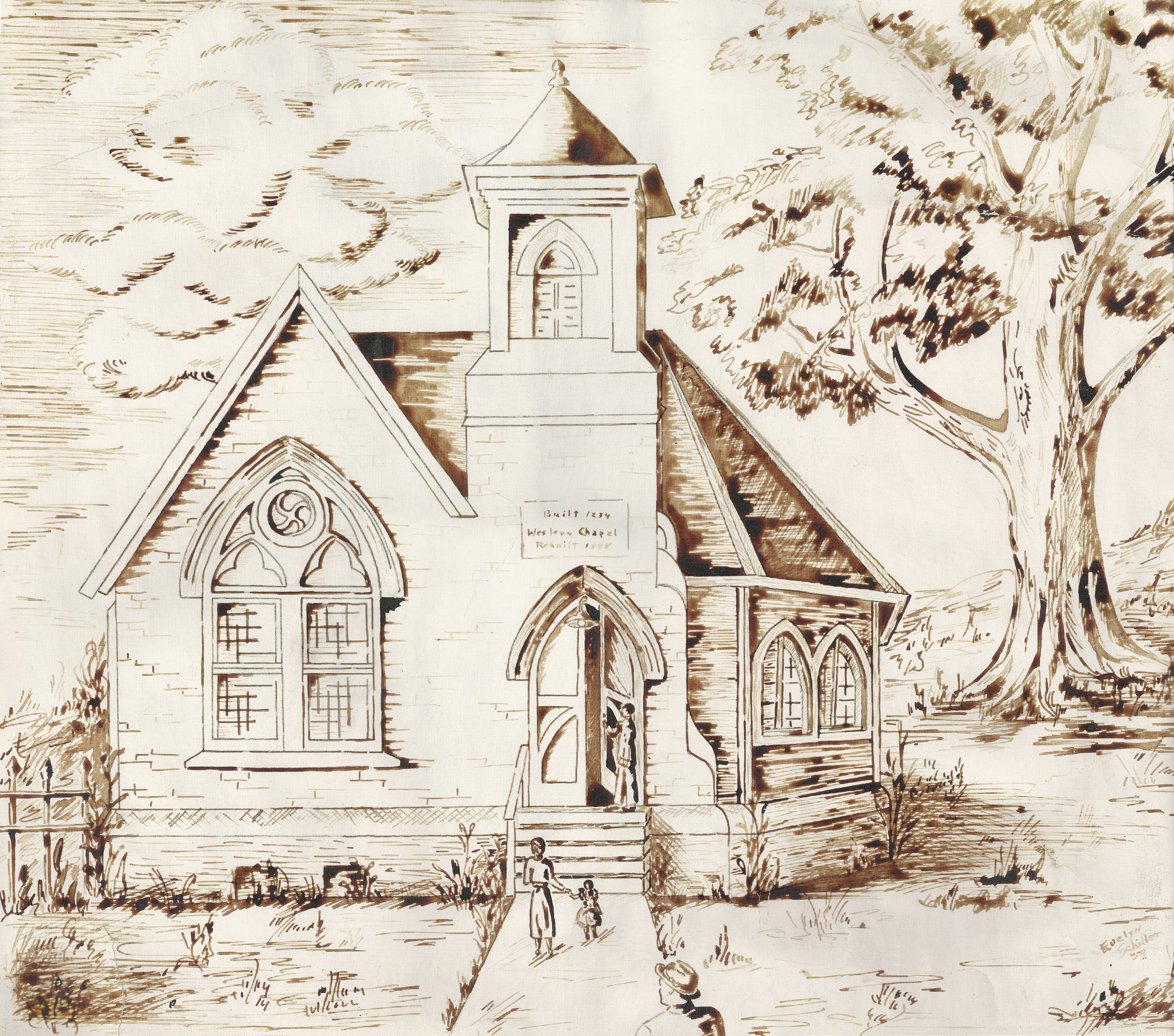
Drawing made of the church sometime before the late 1950s when the bell tower was torn down due to damage from a lightning strike.

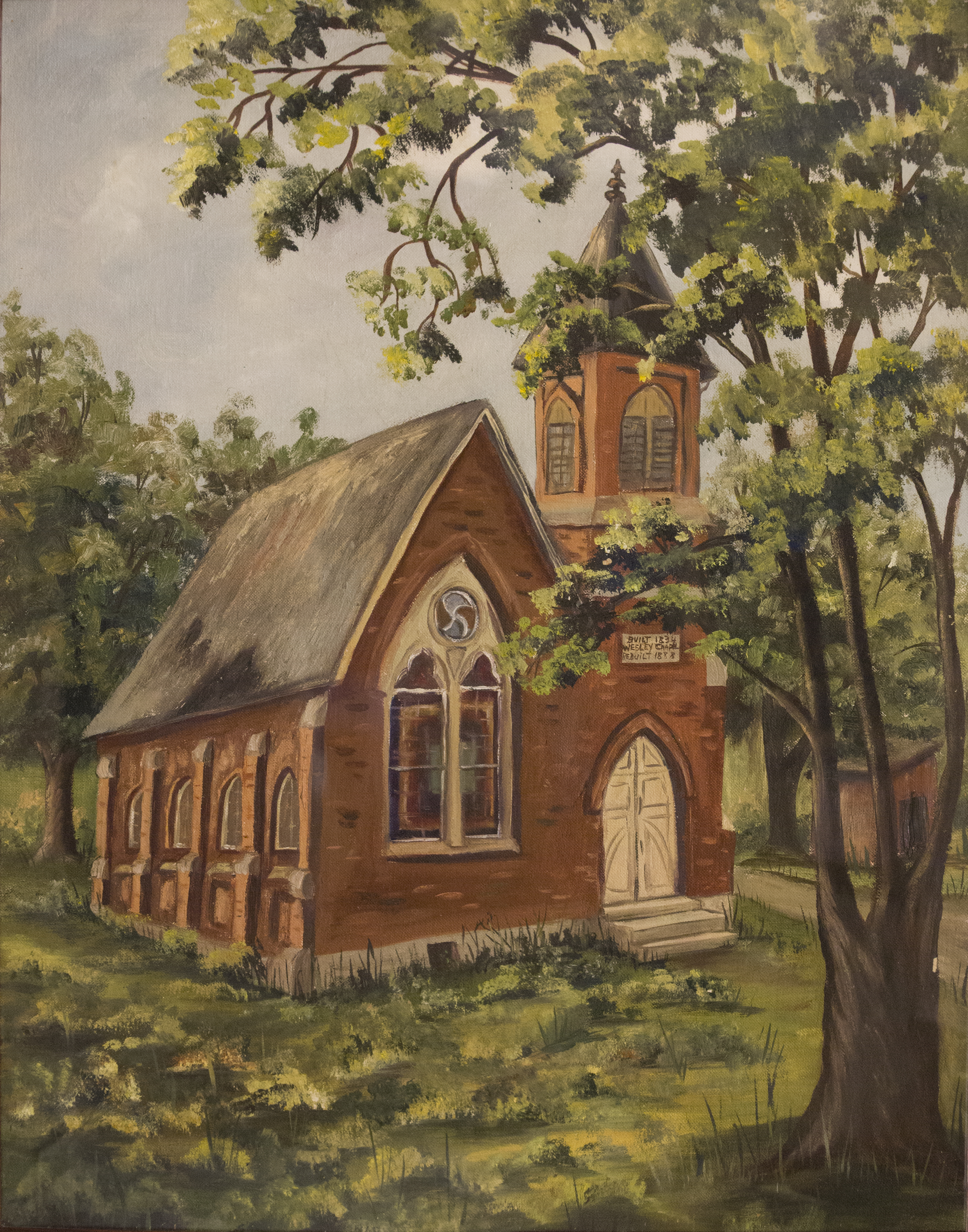
Painting of Wesley Chapel (Hopetown, Ohio) done sometime before the late 1950s when the bell tower was removed due to lightning damage.

Wesley Chapel, also known as the "Hopetown Church", is a historic church building in the unincorporated community of Hopetown, Ohio, United States. Built for a Methodist congregation, the church's earliest portion was constructed in 1834; this rectangular structure forms the core of the present building. Major changes to the building since the 1830s have included the erection of a five-sided addition on the church's northern side in 1888 and significant destruction and repairs after a 1926 lightning strike.

Built of brick on a stone foundation, the church features a distinctive pyramid-shaped roof above the 1888 addition. At one time, the church also included a tower above the entrance; the tower was the portion of the building hit by the 1926 lightning strike, and it was removed as a result. The various architectural elements combine to form a building that is distinctively in the Gothic Revival style.

From its earliest years, Wesley Chapel was the center of community life in Hopetown. The community was settled during the final years of the eighteenth century; the oldest graves in the church's cemetery date from the 1790s. For decade after decade, the church was the location of social activities, such as quilting bees and fish fries. Many years passed without the church being able to obtain its own minister, so it was served by circuit-riding ministers instead. Despite the prosperity brought by the coming of the Ohio and Erie Canal in the 1830s, Hopetown remained small; Wesley Chapel was always at the heart of a small settlement.

In 1979, Wesley Chapel was listed on the National Register of Historic Places, qualifying both because of its historically significant architecture and because of its important place in local history. More than forty Ross County locations are on the Register, but Wesley Chapel is the only religious building among them.
