= Wiltshire Emergency Services =

Wiltshire Emergency Services was a collaboration in the 1990s and early 2000s of the emergency services in Wiltshire, England, namely Wiltshire Police, Great Western Ambulance Service and Wiltshire Fire and Rescue Service. The primary element of this collaboration was the joint control centre in Devizes, which is now operated by the Wiltshire Police only. After both Wiltshire Fire and Rescue Service and the Great Western Ambulance Service ceased to exist following mergers with other services, the dedicated Wiltshire Emergency Services collaboration was abandoned in favour of collaborations between services across wider geographical areas.

== History ==
The Wiltshire Emergency Services project was set up in February 1998 to investigate the feasibility of re-locating all control rooms into one emergency communications centre building, as well sharing information and services. The site chosen for the emergency communications centre was on the Wiltshire Police headquarters site on London Road, Devizes, which was owned by Wiltshire Police Authority.

After extensive consultation it wasn't until July 1999 that the £2.6 million of required funding was secured under the Governments 'Invest to Save' Scheme. The new building, called the Wiltshire Emergency Communications Centre (later known as the Wiltshire Emergency Services Building, or WES Building) was opened by the Duchess of Gloucester in a small ceremony in November 2003.

== Wiltshire Emergency Services Building ==
The Wiltshire Emergency Services building project broke ground in 2001 when the existing Llewellyn Building was demolished and the WES building was begun in its place. The two-storey building at London Road, Devizes was home to all three emergency services' control rooms, as well as a conference room, staff rooms, offices and facilities. The Emergency Communications Centre was also intended to act as a base in the event of a major incident.

The design intention of the centre was that all information would be shared instantly between the three services and that they could collaborate easily if the need arose. However, the collaboration was not without challenges, including a demand from the Fire Brigades Union to have their section partitioned off from the rest of the centre before they were willing to move in. Eventually, both the ambulance and fire service departed to different control centres, primarily aiming to save money. New and improved communication technology was cited as a reason it was no longer necessary to have all services controlled from one place when Wiltshire Fire and Rescue Service moved out of the building in 2013.

Great Western Ambulance Service was originally allocated a quarter of the control room, where their operators wore dark green jumpsuits with green epaulettes. In March 2013 their operations ceased at the centre, with all emergency call handling transferred to Bristol as part of a cost-saving drive intended to save the service £700,000.

Wiltshire Fire and Rescue Service were also allocated a quarter of the control room; their operators wore red shirts with black epaulettes, with bars denoting rank. For much of the period the fire service were present in the centre, plans were in place as part of the FiReControl initiative, introduced by the Labour government, which would see the Wiltshire Fire and Rescue Service control room relocated from Devizes to Taunton alongside fire services covering Gloucestershire, Avon, Somerset, Dorset and Devon and Cornwall. While these plans were eventually scrapped, in an effort to save money Wiltshire Fire and Rescue Service departed the joint centre in 2013.

Wiltshire Police originally occupied half of the control room; their operators wore traditional police white shirt and black tie with epaulettes reading 'Emergency Call Operator' and a bar for Senior operators. Operators were supervised by Force Operations Room Inspectors, who were ranked police Inspectors. There were roughly 80 operators split into teams, then workstations, who worked variable shifts, non-stop, all year round. The caller was put through to the workstation assigned to the location of their incident, the call operators having a detailed knowledge of the area their workstation's area covered. After the departure of the ambulance and fire services in 2013 the police were the only remaining organisation operating from the centre.

In 2014 Wiltshire Police completed a £2 million refurbishment of the centre, bringing both emergency (999) and non-emergency (101) call handling into the same building. Prior to this the police non-emergency Force Contact Centre had been in a separate building.

== Other projects ==
The project oversaw the Wiltshire Police/Air Ambulance Helicopter, a helicopter shared between the police and ambulance service, in an arrangement seen in only one other part of the UK. The partnership came to an end in December 2014 when Wiltshire Police joined the National Police Air Service; the Wiltshire Air Ambulance continuing as an independent entity, entirely charitably funded. The charity leased the base at Devizes until the opening of its new headquarters near Melksham in mid-2018. The air ambulance is now tasked to incidents by the South Western Ambulance Service control centre in Bristol.

The WES arranged for Fire and Rescue crews to use defibrillators so that they can respond to some ambulance calls when there is high demand for ambulances. Another initiative allowed ambulance crews to stand by at fire stations; they now have the use of facilities, when before they had to stay in their vehicles. The WES also oversaw the sharing of stations in Mere and Bradford-on-Avon between ambulance and fire and rescue crews.
