= Wesley, West Virginia =

Wesley
- Unincorporated community
- Location within the state of West Virginia Wesley (the United States)
- Coordinates: 39°10′42″N 81°43′59″W
- Country: United States
- State: West Virginia
- County: Wood
- Elevation: 745 ft (227 m)
- Time zone: UTC-5 (Eastern (EST))
  - Summer (DST): UTC-4 (EDT)
- GNIS feature ID: 1560541

Wesley was an unincorporated community located in Wood County, West Virginia, United States.
