= Evangelical Wesleyan Bible Institute =

Methodist Bible college in Pennsylvania

Coordinates: 41°33′34″N 79°54′36″W

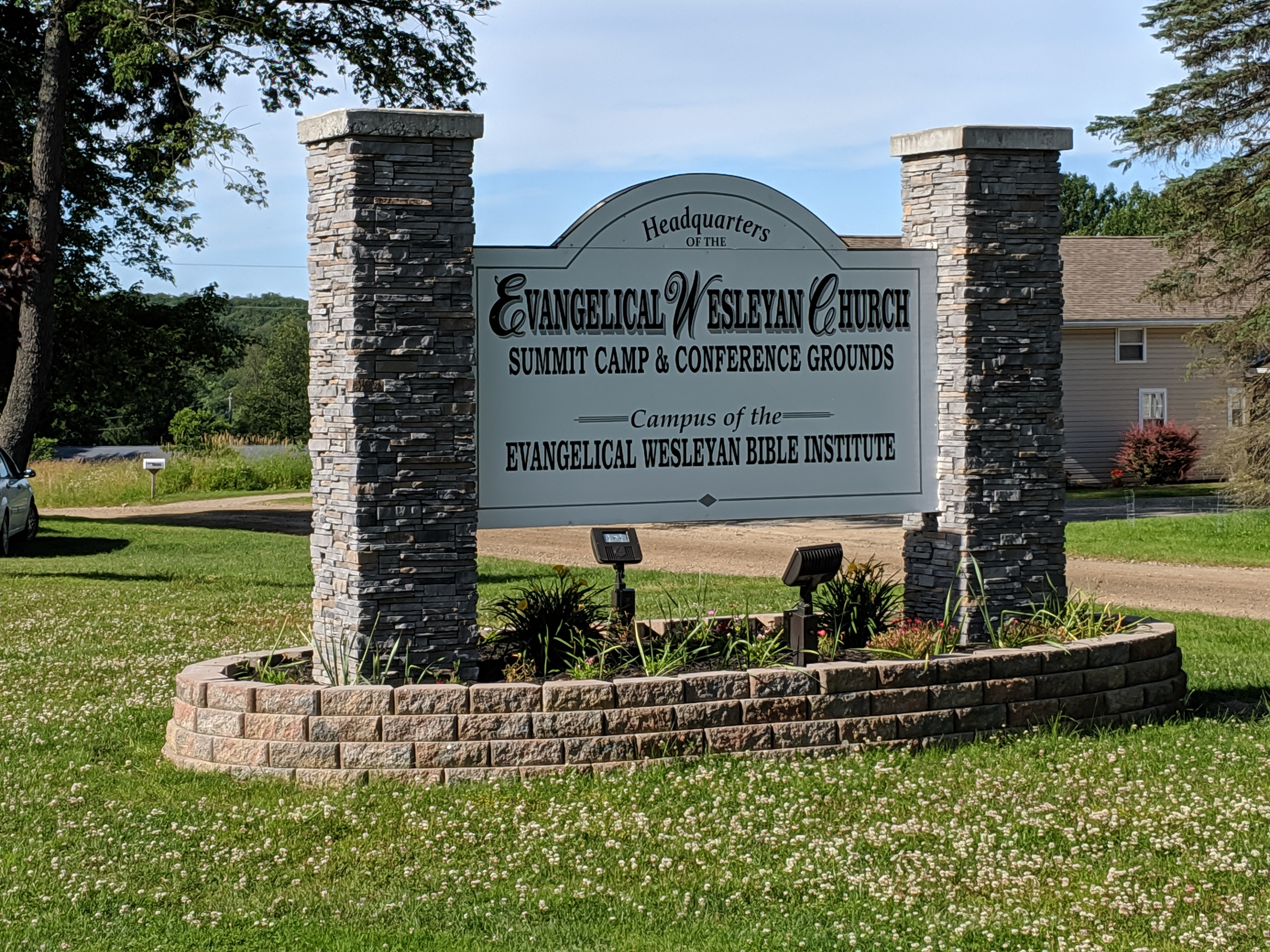
- The entrance to the Evangelical Wesleyan Bible Institute
- Type: Private Bible college
- Established: 1962
- Affiliations: Evangelical Wesleyan Church
- Location: 6605 East Wayne Road; Cooperstown, PA 16317 U.S.A.
- Campus: Countryside

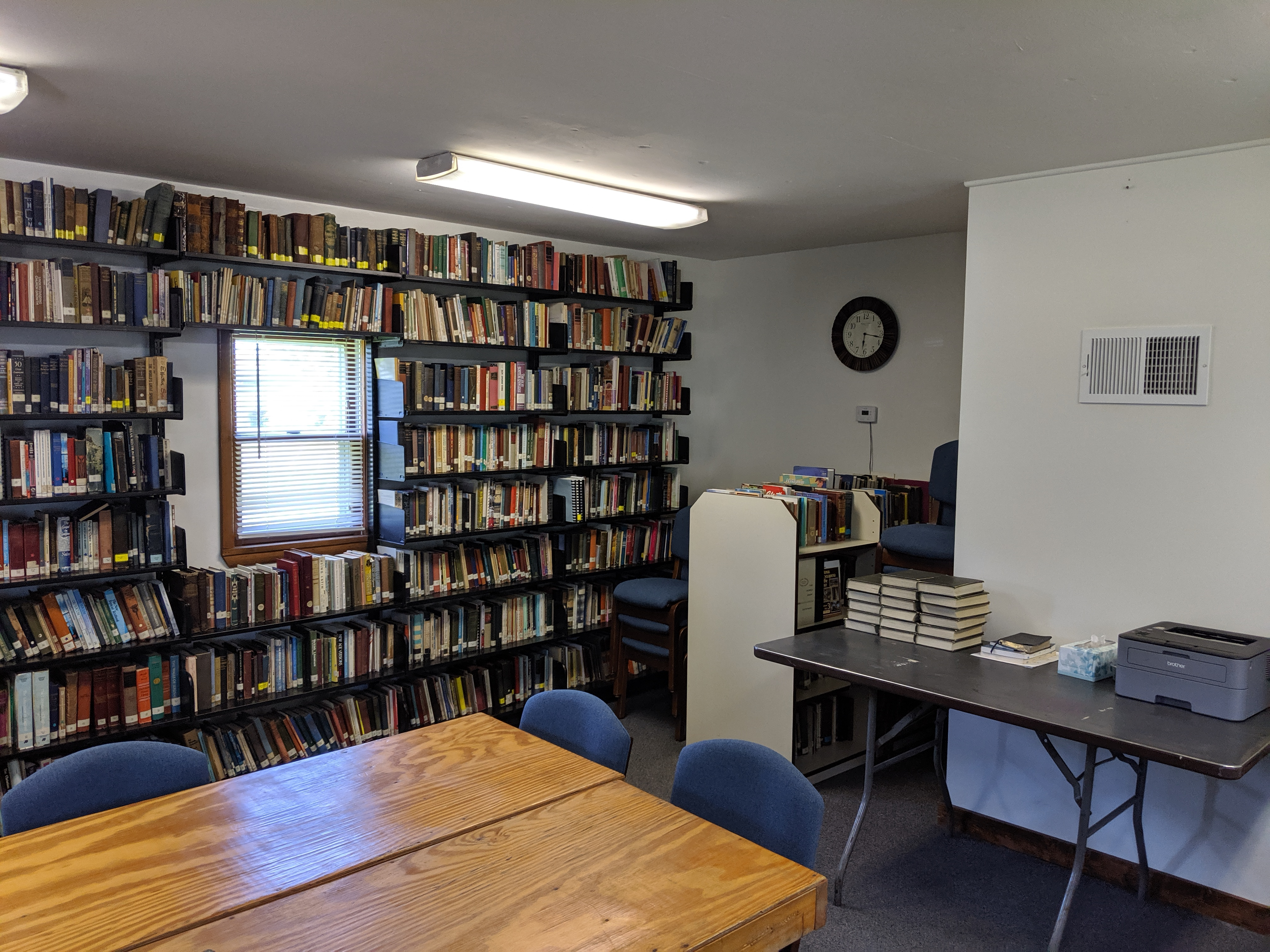
A section of the college library of the Evangelical Wesleyan Bible Institute.

Evangelical Wesleyan Bible Institute (EWBI), also informally known as the Evangelical Wesleyan Bible College, is a private four-year Methodist Bible college in Cooperstown, Pennsylvania. It is affiliated with the Evangelical Wesleyan Church (EWC) and was founded to "preserve and propagate that revival of New Testament Christianity - historic Methodism."

== History ==
Prior to its formation, the Adirondack Missionary Training Center existed in Northville, New York through the work of Melvin McNees. Evangelical Wesleyan Bible Institute was founded in 1962 as Adirondack Bible Institute (ABI), which was later renamed as Adirondack Bible College (ABC). In 2006, the campus was moved from Northville to Cooperstown, Pennsylvania.

The presidents of the Evangelical Wesleyan Bible Institute have included:

- Harold Cranston (1962 - 1966)
- Sherwood Weeks (1966 - 1968)
- Marshall Mcleery (1968 - 1976)
- Charles Wesley McCleery (1976 - 1978)
- Charles Downs (1978 - 1980)
- Marshall McCleery (1980 - 1983)
- Robert Symons (1983 - 1995)
- William L. Sarber (1995 - 2004)
- Timothy J. Yaugher (2004 - 2005)

== Admissions ==
Evangelical Wesleyan Bible Institute has an open admissions policy, welcoming "applications from any academically qualified person, regardless of race, color, national or ethnic origin".

== Academics ==
Evangelical Wesleyan Bible Institute offers an Associate degree in Religion, Bachelor of Christian Ministries, Bachelor of Theology, and a Bachelor of Religious Education. Majors include Christian Ministry, Christian Missions, Sacred Theology, and Christian Education.

== Student life ==
The Evangelical Wesleyan Bible Institute has an active student choir as well as internship programs with churches affiliated with the Evangelical Wesleyan Church.
