= Cooperstown, Pennsylvania =

Borough in Pennsylvania, US

- Borough
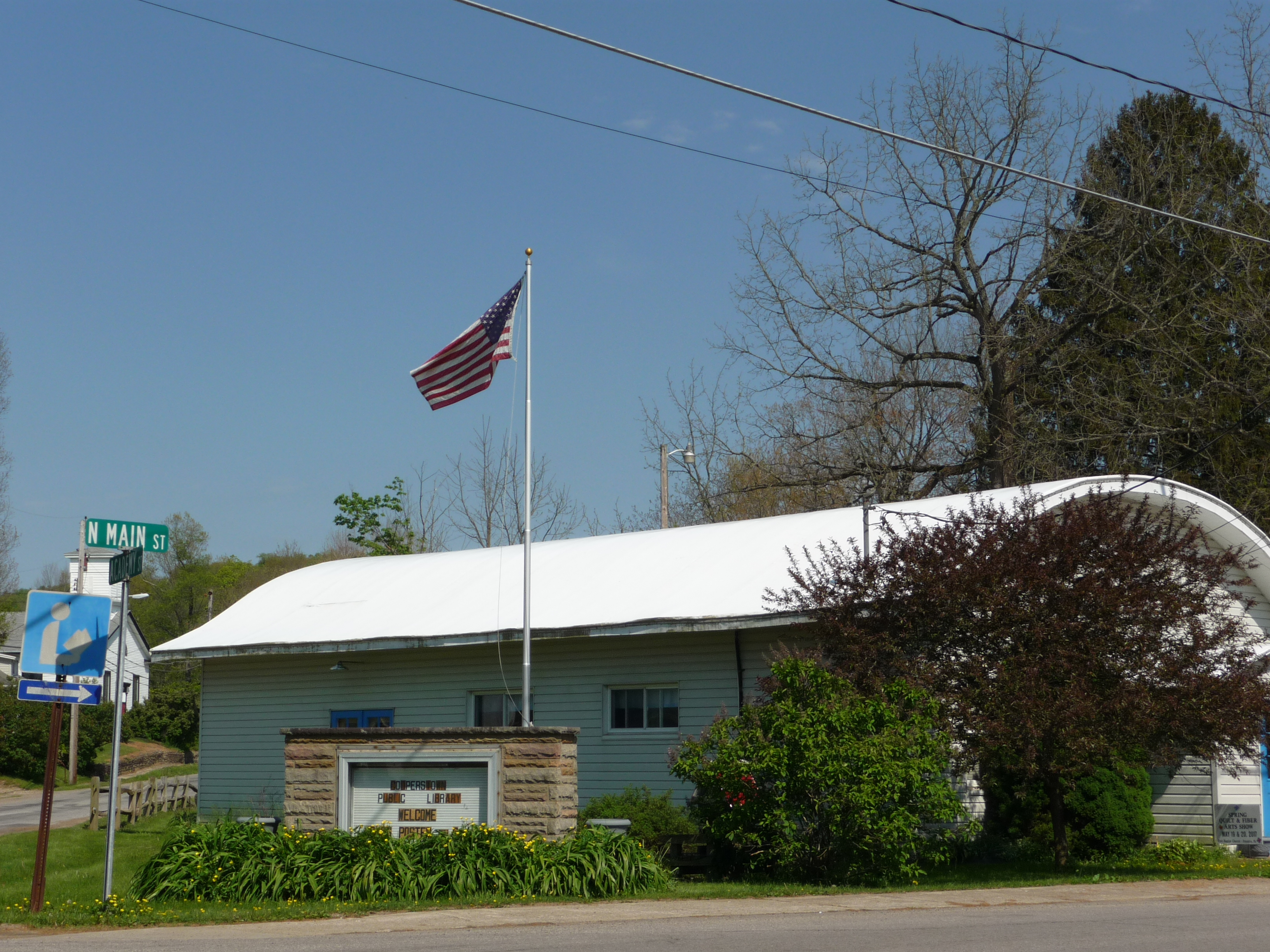
- The Cooperstown Public Library

- Location of Cooperstown in Venango County, Pennsylvania.

- Location within Pennsylvania
- Coordinates: 41°29′59″N 79°52′26″W
- Country: United States
- State: Pennsylvania
- County: Venango
- Settled: 1797
- Incorporated: 1858

Government
  - Type: Borough Council

Area
  - Total: 0.55 sq mi (1.43 km^{2})
  - Land: 0.55 sq mi (1.43 km^{2})
  - Water: 0 sq mi (0.00 km^{2})

Population (2020)
  - Total: 399
  - Density: 720.7/sq mi (278.27/km^{2})
- Time zone: UTC-5 (Eastern (EST))
  - Summer (DST): UTC-4 (EDT)
- Zip code: 16317
- Area code: 814
- FIPS code: 42-16080

Cooperstown is a borough in Venango County, Pennsylvania, United States. As of the 2020 census, Cooperstown had a population of 399.

== Geography ==
Cooperstown is located at 41°29′59″N 79°52′26″W (41.499640, -79.873823).

According to the United States Census Bureau, the borough has a total area of 0.6 square miles (1.6 km^{2}), all land.

== Demographics ==
Historical population
Census	Pop.	Note	%±
1870	264		—
1880	297		12.5%
1890	290		−2.4%
1900	243		−16.2%
1910	181		−25.5%
1920	194		7.2%
1930	202		4.1%
1940	205		1.5%
1950	271		32.2%
1960	267		−1.5%
1970	478		79.0%
1980	644		34.7%
1990	506		−21.4%
2000	460		−9.1%
2010	460		0.0%
2020	399		−13.3%
2021 (est.)	390	▼	−2.3%

As of the census of 2000, there were 460 people, 187 households, and 146 families residing in the borough. The population density was 786.0 inhabitants per square mile (303.5/km^{2}). There were 198 housing units at an average density of 338.3 per square mile (130.6/km^{2}). The racial makeup of the borough was 99.78% White and 0.22% Asian. Hispanic or Latino of any race were 1.30% of the population.

There were 187 households, out of which 26.2% had children under the age of 18 living with them, 67.9% were married couples living together, 6.4% had a female householder with no husband present, and 21.9% were non-families. 18.7% of all households were made up of individuals, and 10.2% had someone living alone who was 65 years of age or older. The average household size was 2.46 and the average family size was 2.77.

In the borough the population was spread out, with 21.3% under the age of 18, 7.6% from 18 to 24, 25.0% from 25 to 44, 31.1% from 45 to 64, and 15.0% who were 65 years of age or older. The median age was 43 years. For every 100 females there were 92.5 males. For every 100 females age 18 and over, there were 93.6 males.

The median income for a household in the borough was $37,143, and the median income for a family was $41,875. Males had a median income of $34,375 versus $20,455 for females. The per capita income for the borough was $16,314. About 8.8% of families and 8.4% of the population were below the poverty line, including 12.3% of those under age 18 and 10.7% of those age 65 or over.

== Education ==
Cooperstown is home to Evangelical Wesleyan Bible College (EWBC), a four-year academic institution affiliated with the Evangelical Wesleyan Church.
