= Wesley Methodist Cathedral =

Wesley Methodist Cathedral is the name of several cathedrals of the Methodist Church Ghana:

- Wesley Methodist Cathedral (Accra)
- Wesley Methodist Cathedral (Cape Coast)
- Wesley Methodist Cathedral (Kumasi)
- Wesley Methodist Cathedral (Sekondi)
