= Vesly =

Vesly may refer to the following communes in France:

- Vesly, Eure, in the Eure département
- Vesly, Manche, in the Manche département
