= Wes =

Wes or WES may refer to:

== Organizations ==
- World Education Services, United States and Canada (founded 1974)
- Wiltshire Emergency Services, South West England (1998–2014)
- Women's Engineering Society, United Kingdom (founded 1919)

== People ==
- Wes (given name), a list of people and fictional characters so named
- Wes Madiko (1964–2021), Cameroonian musician
- William Wesley (born 1964), American basketball executive
- Wesley "Wes" Correa (born 1962), American–Puerto-Rican basketball player

== Places ==
- Outer Hebrides or Western Isles, IIGA country code
- Wesel (district), Germany (on vehicle registration plates)
- Westmorland, county in England (Chapman code in genealogy)
- WES Commuter Rail, a rail line in Oregon, United States

== Science and technology ==
- Warehouse execution system, in the distribution industry
- Whole exome sequencing, in genomics
- Windows Embedded Standard, an operating system

== Arts and entertainment ==
- Wes (TV series), a Sri Lankan teledrama
