= Wesleyan Philosophical Society =

The Wesleyan Philosophical Society (WPS) is an academic society largely represented by academic institutions affiliated with Christian denominations in the Wesleyan tradition. Despite its primarily Wesleyan orientation, there has been increasing participation from scholars in Catholic, Orthodox, and other Protestant (such as Lutheran and Pentecostal) traditions. Likewise, there are no formal doctrinal or affiliational requirements for membership in the society or participation (including as a presenter) at its conferences. Anyone with an interest in philosophical subjects pertaining to conference themes (broadly construed) is welcome to attend, regardless of his or her personal theological orientation or affiliation.

== History ==
The society was conceived during a 2001 meeting of the Wesleyan Theological Society meeting at Azusa Pacific University in Azusa, California. Brint Montgomery, Thomas Jay Oord, and Robert Thompson served as the early organizing forces. The society first met in Hobe Sound, Florida in March 2002. The society has grown steadily since then, featuring up to approximately 30 papers (as space and time allow) per conference in recent years. Since the COVID-19 era, the WPS has remained on hiatus.

== Publications ==
The WPS gives notice of its recent publications on its official website (see below). Typically, books result from the peer-reviewed process and presentation of annual papers at the conference. The WPS website is maintained by Brint Montgomery, professor of philosophy at Southern Nazarene University.
The society's published books:

- The Many Facets of Love: Philosophical Explorations. Cambridge Scholars Publishing, Thomas Jay Oord, editor. 2006 Select Proceedings.
- Holiness Unto Truth. Intersections between Wesleyan and Roman Catholic Voices. Cambridge Scholars Publishing, L. Bryan Williams, editor. 2007 Select Proceedings.
- I More than Others: Responses to Evil and Suffering, Eric Severson, editor. 2009 select proceedings and invited essay from John Caputo (professor emeritus, Syracuse University and Villanova University)
- Gift and Economy: Ethics, Markets, and Morality. Cambridge Scholars Publishing, Eric Severson, editor. 2011 selected proceedings and invited essay from Richard Kearney, Boston College (co-authored by Eric Severson)
- This is My Body: Philosophical Reflections on Embodiment in a Wesleyan Spirit Pickwick, John Brittingham and Christina Smerick, eds. 2016
- In Spirit and In Truth: Philosophical Reflections on Liturgy and Worship, Claremont Press, Wm. Curtis Holtzen and Matthew Nelson Hill, eds. 2016 selected proceedings and invited essay from Nicholas Wolterstorff
- Connecting Faith and Science: Philosophical and Theological Inquiries, Claremont Press, Matthew Nelson Hill and Wm. Curtis Holtzen, eds. 2017 selected proceedings and invited essays

== Conferences ==
WPS meets each year at various sites around the United States. While independent, the WPS has also maintains a relationship with the older Wesleyan Theological Society, meeting each year a day prior to the WTS at the same location.

- 2019: #MeToo, #BLM, #NeverAgain: Philosophy and the Politics of Culture Change, March 14, 2019 Wesley Seminary, Washington, DC
- 2018: The Question of Identity and Personhood: Philosophical/Theological Reflections on the Self and Space, March 8, 2018 Pentecostal Theological Seminary, Cleveland, TN
- 2017: Philosophy, Religion, and the Reality of Race, March 2, 2017 Asbury Theological Seminary, Wilmore, KY
- 2016: Thinking about the Book of Nature: Developing a Philosophy of Science and Religion, March 10, 2016 Point Loma Nazarene University, San Diego, CA
- 2015: In Spirit and in Truth: Philosophical Reflections on Worship and Liturgy, March 6, 2015 Mount Vernon Nazarene University, Mount Vernon, Ohio
- 2014: This is My Body: Philosophical Explorations of Embodiment, March 6, 2014 Northwest Nazarene University, Nampa, Idaho
- 2013: Are There Good Reasons to Believe? Epistemology and Christian Faith, March, 21, 2013 Seattle Pacific University, Seattle, Washington
- 2012: Curb Your Enthusiasm? Philosophy and Religious Experience, March 1, 2012 Trevecca Nazarene University, Nashville, Tennessee
- 2011: Philosophy and Popular Culture: Medium, Message, and 'the Masses'., March 3, 2011, Southern Methodist University, Dallas, Texas
- 2010: Gift and Economy: Ethics, Hospitality and the Market., March 4, 2010, Azusa Pacific University, Azusa, California
- 2009: 'I More Than the Others:’ A Response to Evil and Suffering, 2009, Anderson University (Indiana), Anderson, Indiana
- 2008: Philosophy and Science: Contemporary Explorations, Duke University, Durham, North Carolina
- 2007: Themes of Wesleyan and Catholic Thought, Olivet Nazarene University, Bourbonnais, Illinois
- 2006: Love: Investigating its Meaning, History and Expressions,³ Nazarene Theological Seminary, Kansas City, Missouri
- 2005: Political and Social Philosophy, Seattle Pacific University, Seattle, Washington
- 2004: Virtue, Reason & Morality: Considering Ethics, Roberts Wesleyan College, Rochester, New York
- 2003: Religious Experience, Asbury Theological Seminary, Lexington, Kentucky
- 2002: Hobe Sound, Florida

== Organization ==
WPS leadership is elected from members of the society at its annual business meeting during its conference. Its executive leadership consists of a President, 1st Vice-President, and 2nd Vice-President. The organisation also maintains a review coordinator for submissions, and a promotional secretary.

=== Past presidents ===
- 2018-2019: Matthew Hill, Spring Arbor University, Spring Arbor, Michigan
- 2017-2018: John Brittingham, Greenville College, Greenville, Illinois
- 2016-2017: Jim Stump, BioLogos
- 2015-2016: Wm. Curtis Holtzen, Hope International University, Fullerton, California
- 2014-2015: Christian Smerick, Greenville College, Greenville, Illinois
- 2013-2014: Joseph Bankard, Northwest Nazarene University, Nampa, Idaho
- 2012-2013: Teri Merrick, Azusa Pacific University, Azusa, California
- 2011-2012: Timothy Crutcher, Southern Nazarene University, Bethany, Oklahoma
- 2010–2011: Eric Severson, Eastern Nazarene College, Quincy, Massachusetts
- 2009–2010: Heather Ross, Point Loma Nazarene University, San Diego, California
- 2008–2009: Robert Thompson, Point Loma Nazarene University, San Diego, California
- 2007–2008: L. Bryan Williams, Warner Pacific College, Portland, Oregon
- 2006–2007: Craig Boyd, Azusa Pacific University, Azusa, California
- 2005–2006: Eric Manchester, Caldwell College, Caldwell, New Jersey
- 2004–2005: Barry Bryant, Memphis Theological Seminary, Memphis, Tennessee
- 2003–2004: Brint Montgomery, Southern Nazarene University, Bethany, Oklahoma
- 2002–2003: Thomas Jay Oord, Northwest Nazarene University, Nampa, Idaho
