= Wesley College =

Wesley College may refer to:

== Australia ==
- Wesley College, Adelaide, a former Methodist theological college in Adelaide, South Australia
- Wesley College, Melbourne, a private school in Melbourne, Victoria
- Wesley College, Perth, a private school in Perth, Western Australia
- Wesley College, University of Sydney, a residential college in Sydney, New South Wales

== United Kingdom ==
- Wesley College (Bristol), a former theological college in Bristol
- Wesley College, Sheffield, a former school in South Yorkshire

== United States ==
- Wesley College (Delaware), a former private liberal arts college in Dover, Delaware, now part of Delaware State University
- Wesley College (Mississippi), a former bible college

== Other countries ==
- Wesley College, Auckland, a secondary school in Auckland, New Zealand
- Wesley College (Belize), a secondary school in Belize City, Belize
- Wesley College, Dublin, a secondary school in Dublin Ireland
- Wesley College (Manitoba), a former tertiary college in Winnipeg, Canada
- Wesley College, Colombo, a R-12 school in Colombo, Sri Lanka
- Wesley College of Education, Kumasi, a teacher education college in Kumasi, Ashanti Region, Ghana

== See also ==
- John Wesley College, a Methodist seminary in Pretoria, South Africa
- Laurel University, formerly John Wesley College, North Carolina, US
- Wellesley College, women's liberal arts college in Massachusetts, US
- Wesley Girls' Senior High School, Cape Coast, Ghana
- Wesley House, Cambridge, United Kingdom
- Wesleyan University (disambiguation)
