= Wesley College, Adelaide =

Wesley College, in Adelaide, South Australia, was a Methodist Church of Australasia theological college, which, with the Parkin College, was the predecessor of Uniting College for Leadership and Theology.

== History ==
Wesley college was a theological college of the Methodist Church of Australasia from 1927 to 1968. It was the successor institution to the Methodist Training Home at Brighton. In 1926, the struggling Chapman-Alexander Bible Institute transferred the property at 20 King William Road, Wayville to the Methodist Church for use as a theological college. In May 1927, the students transferred from Brighton and Wesley College was formed. Its official title was "Wesley College: With Which is Incorporated the Australasian Chapman-Alexander Bible Institute".

From 1930, staff of the Congregational Union of Australia's Parkin College and Wesley College lectured students of both institutions. In the 1950s the Baptist College was founded in Northgate Street, Unley Park and further sharing of staff occurred, although more limited than between Parkin and Wesley. In 1968, Parkin College and Wesley Theological College merged to form Parkin-Wesley College (now Uniting College for Leadership and Theology) at the site of Wesley College.

== Chapman Alexander Bible Institute ==
In 1904, Richard and Emily White gave their original home, Wekewauban, to the Chapman Alexander Bible Institute. In 1926, the struggling Chapman-Alexander Bible Institute transferred the property at 20 King William Road, Wayville to the Methodist Church for use as a theological college. A historical marker was unveiled at the site in May 2008.
