= Charles Wesley (baseball) =

American baseball player

- Outfielder / Second baseman
- Born: July 4, 1896; Montgomery, Alabama, U.S.
- Died: March 5, 1944 (aged 47); Panama City, Florida, U.S.
- Batted: Right Threw: Right

Negro league baseball debut
- 1921, for the Columbus Buckeyes

Last appearance
- 1939, for the Atlanta Black Crackers/Indianapolis ABCs
- Managerial record at Baseball Reference

Teams
- Columbus Buckeyes (1921); Indianapolis ABCs (1922); St. Louis Stars (1922); Birmingham Black Barons (1923–1925, 1928–1929); Memphis Red Sox (1925–1927, 1929); Louisville White Sox (1930); Atlanta Black Crackers/Indianapolis ABCs (1939)

Charles Wesley (July 4, 1896 – March 5, 1944), nicknamed "Two Sides", was an American professional baseball player in the Negro leagues. He played from 1921 to 1939 with several teams, but he played mostly for the Birmingham Black Barons.

He played with his final team in 1930, the Louisville White Sox. He died in Panama City, Florida, on March 5, 1944.
