= Southern Wesleyan University =

Christian university in Central, South Carolina, US

- Former names: Wesleyan Methodist Bible Institute (1906–1908); Wesleyan Methodist College (1908–1959); Central Wesleyan College (1959–1994)
- Type: Private university
- Established: 1906; 120 years ago
- Affiliations: SACSCOC
- Religious affiliation: Wesleyan Church
- President: William Barker
- Provost: Robert McFarland
- Students: 1,175
- Undergraduates: 896
- Postgraduates: 279
- Location: Central, South Carolina, United States; 34°43′27.6″N 82°46′18.9″W
- Campus: Rural, 350 acres
- Colors: Blue, light blue
- Nickname: Warriors
- Sporting affiliations: NCAA Division II – Carolinas; NCCAA
- Mascot: Ty the Warrior
- Website: swu.edu
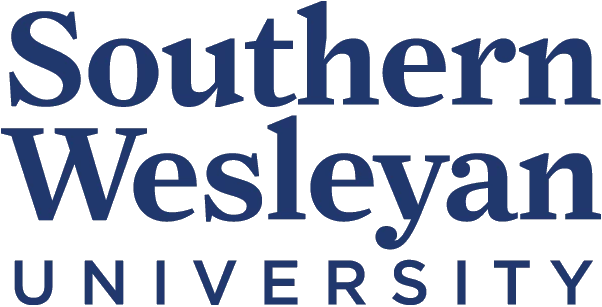

Southern Wesleyan University is a private Christian university in Central, South Carolina, United States. It was founded in 1906 by what is now the Wesleyan Church. The institution is accredited by the Southern Association of Colleges and Schools Commission on Colleges to award associate, bachelor's, master's, and doctoral degrees.

The university offers approximately 35 major areas of study for undergraduates and also offers graduate and doctoral degrees in the areas of business and education. The university serves approximately 1,600 students. There are more than 800 undergraduates enrolled at the main campus. In addition, undergraduate, graduate, and doctoral programs are offered in a fully online format.

The school has 18 intercollegiate athletic teams that compete in the National Collegiate Athletic Association (NCAA) Division II as well as the National Christian College Athletic Association (NCCAA). Since 2007, the university's athletic teams have won 17 NCCAA national championship titles.

== History ==
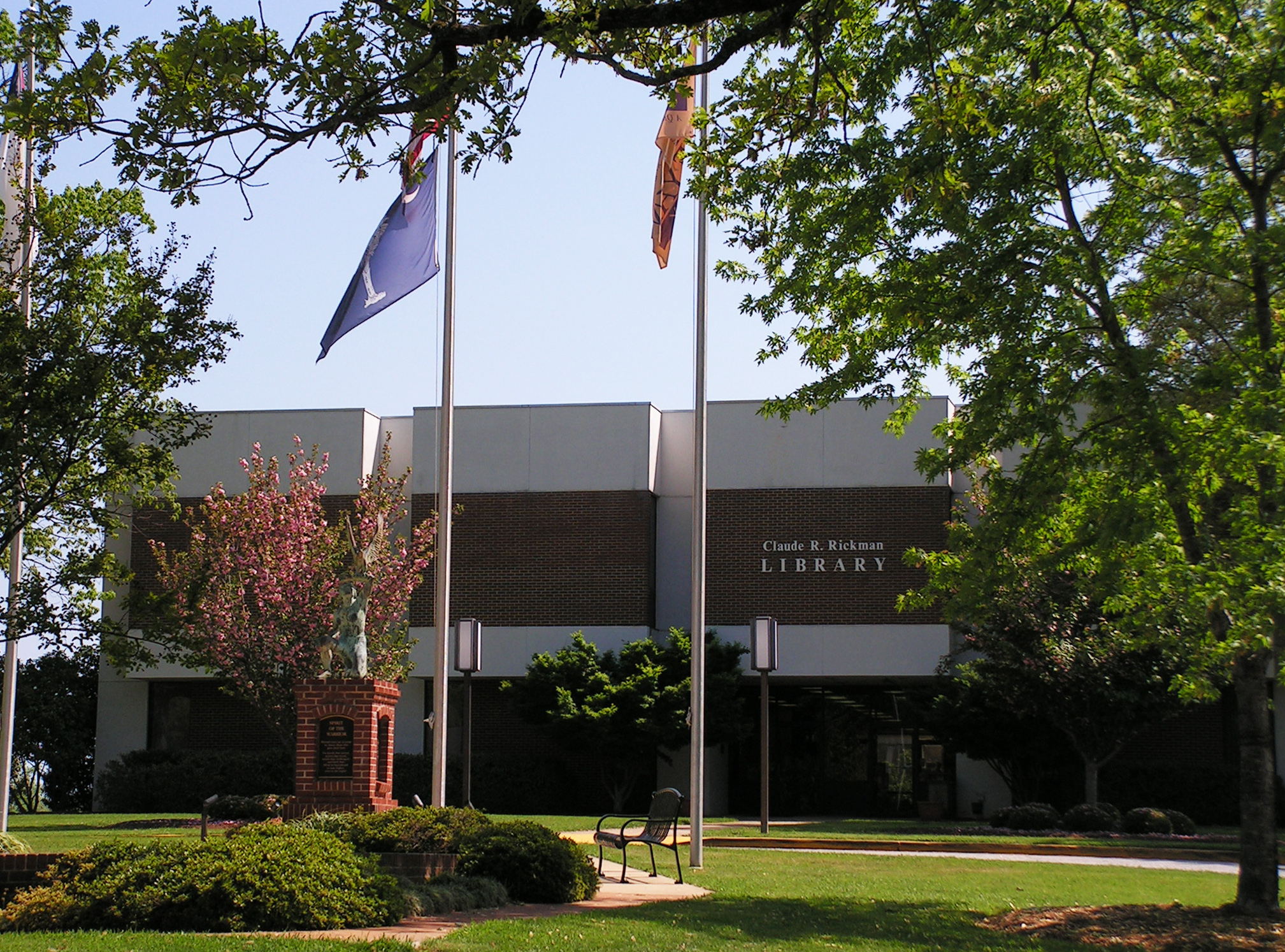
Rickman Library

In 1904, representatives of Wesleyan Methodist churches in South Carolina and surrounding states met at Central to consider the possibility of establishing a college. Classes at the new school began on October 15, 1906, with students from first grade through college. Initially known as the "Wesleyan Methodist Bible Institute" (1906–1908), subsequent names included "Wesleyan Methodist College" (1909–1959) and "Central Wesleyan College" (1959–1994). The school was renamed Southern "Wesleyan University" in 1994.

Beginning in 1928, the college operated as a two-year junior college, with a four-year theological program. In 1958, the pre-college programs were phased out, and the college moved to a full four-year program. The junior college program received accreditation that same year, and Central Wesleyan College (as the school was then called) was accredited to award bachelor's degrees in 1973. The university is accredited by the Commission on Colleges of the Southern Association of Colleges and Schools to award associate's, bachelor's and master's degrees.

In addition to the traditional program, in 1986 a nontraditional program for working adults was added. Initially known as Leadership Education for Adult Professionals (LEAP), the program expanded to include various associate, bachelor's, and master's programs in an evening class format. The program evolved into what are now the fully online programs at SWU.

The university was granted an exception to Title IX in 2015 which allows it to legally discriminate against LGBT students for religious reasons.

== Academics ==
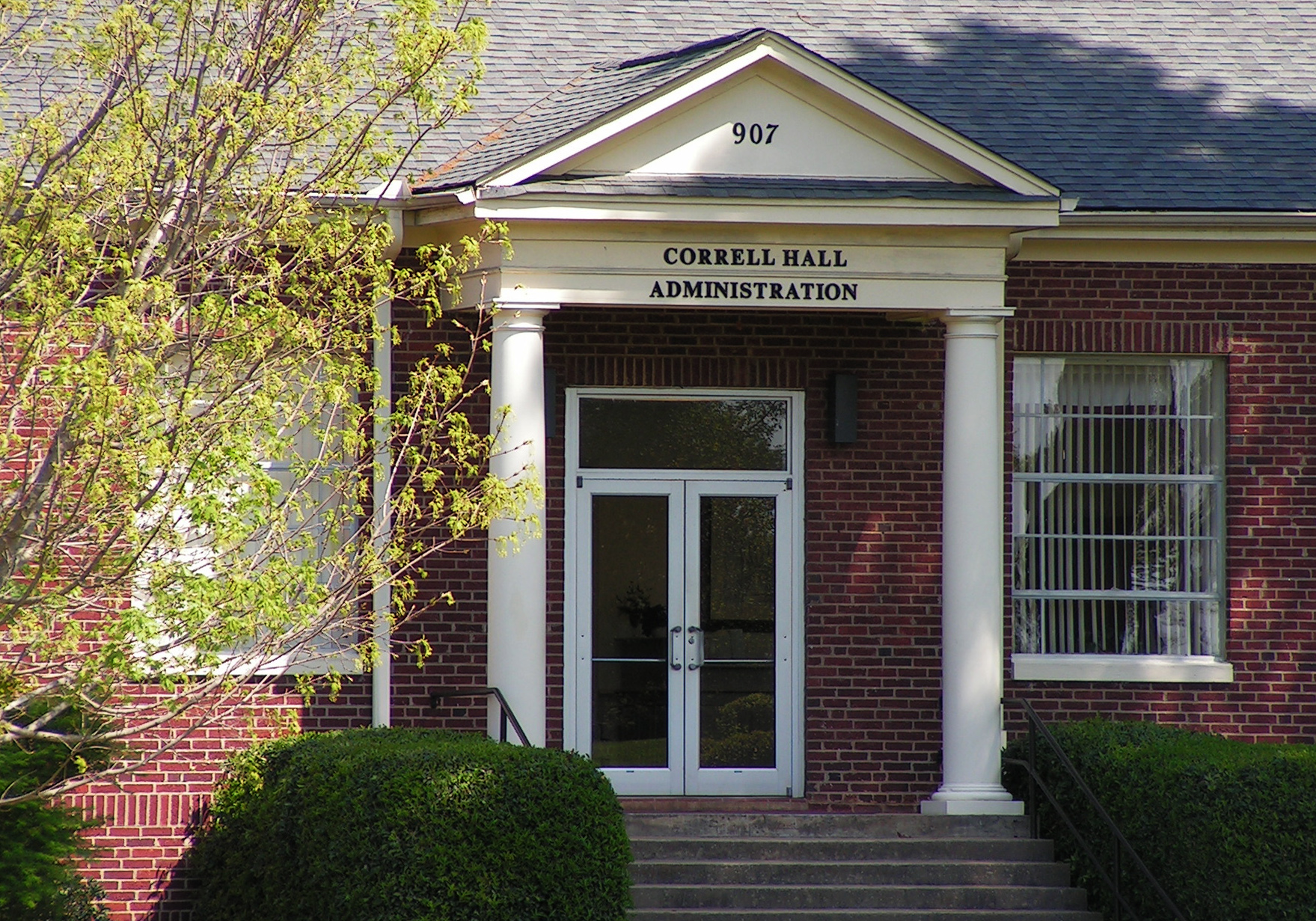
SWU Administration Building

The university has been accredited by the Southern Association of Colleges and Schools since 1973. In 2008, the School of Education was also accredited by the National Council for Accreditation of Teacher Education for the teacher education programs at the undergraduate and master's levels. Degree programs in music and music education are also accredited by the National Association of Schools of Music as of 2008.

Southern Wesleyan University offers undergraduate and graduate degrees in two schools and one college.

The School of Education provides training for teaching careers in public and private education. This training is geared toward instruction for the elementary and secondary school levels.

The Benson School of Business provides business education with a Christian perspective. It offers a Bachelor of Science in Business Administration (BSBA), Master of Business Administration (MBA), and Master of Science in management (MSM) in various concentrations.

The College of Arts and Sciences offers a broad range of academic disciplines, such as Christian ministry, the humanities, fine arts, and the social, natural and computational sciences.

== Campus ==
Southern Wesleyan University (SWU) occupies a 350-acre (142 ha) campus near the town of Central, South Carolina.

== Student life ==
Student Life maintains student government, Student Activities, athletics, first year experience, counseling, retention, and overall student life. Student Life hosts an annual Day of Service in which students and staff participate in various projects in the local community. Service projects include such things as food drives, brush clean up, entertainment and cleaning. Southern Wesleyan's goal for student life is to integrate faith, living, and learning into students’ education and to cultivate strong men and women who desire to embody the character of Christ.

=== SWUnity ===
There was an unofficial LGBT student organization called SWUnity. The organization's faculty sponsor, Beth Stuart, was fired in 2013 because she refused to withdraw her support of SWUnity. Pre-marital sex, homosexual acts, and "sexual perversions" are prohibited by the Southern Wesleyan University Student Handbook as well as other internal policies for faculty and staff.

== Athletics ==
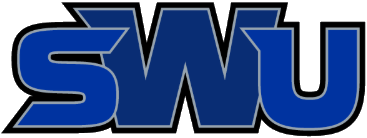
Warriors wordmark logo

The Southern Wesleyan (SWU) athletics teams are called the Warriors. A new logo was introduced in 2013, but the Warrior nickname was retained. The university is a member of the NCAA Division II ranks, primarily competing in the Conference Carolinas since the 2014–15 academic year (with NCAA D-II full member status since 2016–17). They are also a member of the National Christian College Athletic Association (NCCAA), primarily competing as an independent in the South Region of the Division I level. The Warriors previously competed in the Southern States Athletic Conference (SSAC; formerly known as Georgia–Alabama–Carolina Conference (GACC) until after the 2003–04 school year) of the National Association of Intercollegiate Athletics (NAIA) from 1999–2000 to 2013–14.

SWU completes in 12 intercollegiate varsity sports: Men's sports include baseball, basketball, cross country, soccer and track & field; while women's sports include basketball, cross country, lacrosse, soccer, softball, track & field and volleyball. Club sports include co-ed bass fishing. Former sports included men's & women's golf, and men's & women's tennis.

=== Nickname ===
A new logo was introduced in 2013, but the Warrior nickname was retained.

=== Men's soccer ===
In 2013, the men's soccer team won the Division I NCCAA National Championships and Camilo Rodriguez, the team's head coach was awarded NCCAA's Coach of the Year.

=== Women's basketball ===
In 2007, the SWU women's basketball team was awarded the NCCAA National Championship.

=== National Championships ===
The SWU Warriors have won 11 National Christian College Athletic Association (NCCAA) national championship titles:

- Women's basketball - 2007
- Men's baseball - 2007
- Men's soccer - 2013 and 2015
- Men's golf (Zach Moore - Individual Play) - 2013
- Women's Indoor Track & Field 4 x 400 meters event - 2015 and 2016
- Men's Outdoor Track & Field triple jump event - 2016
- Women's Outdoor Track & Field
  - 400 meters event - 2015
  - 100 meters hurdle event - 2016
  - 4 x 100 meters event - 2016

=== Intramural athletics ===
Open to students of all skill levels, intramural sports include basketball, flag football, ping pong, sand volleyball, soccer, and softball.

== Spiritual life ==
=== Ministry teams ===
Southern Wesleyan University offers opportunities for students to be involved with a ministry team that is funded by the university. There are three types of ministry teams sent out by the university: Recreation Ministry Teams, The Difference and University Singers.

==== Recreation Ministry Teams ====
Recreation Ministry Teams serve as needed at various Christian summer camps in the months of June and July.

==== University Singers ====
University Singers is a traveling vocal group which performs religious music at various churches and events. They sing a mixture of contemporary and traditional gospel music.

== Notable alumni ==
- Peter Campbell, professional golfer
- Gareth Lee Cockerill, theologian, professor
- Shannon Faulkner, first woman admitted into The Citadel
- Davey Hiott, South Carolina State Representative
- Ken Schenck, theologian, professor
- Tadala Kandulu Ngosi Malawian former national tennis champion

== Photo gallery ==
Views of Southern Wesleyan University Campus

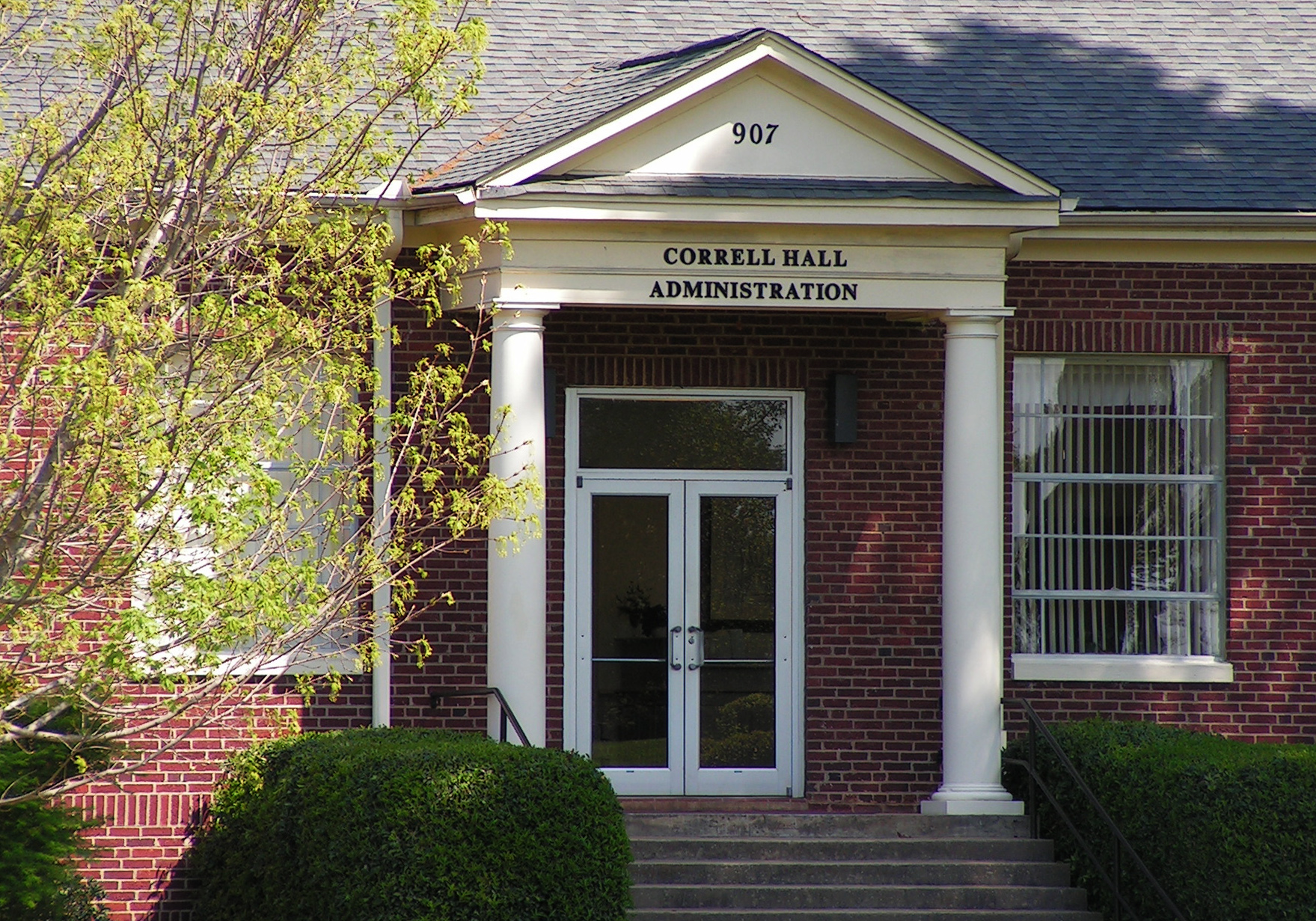
Administration Building

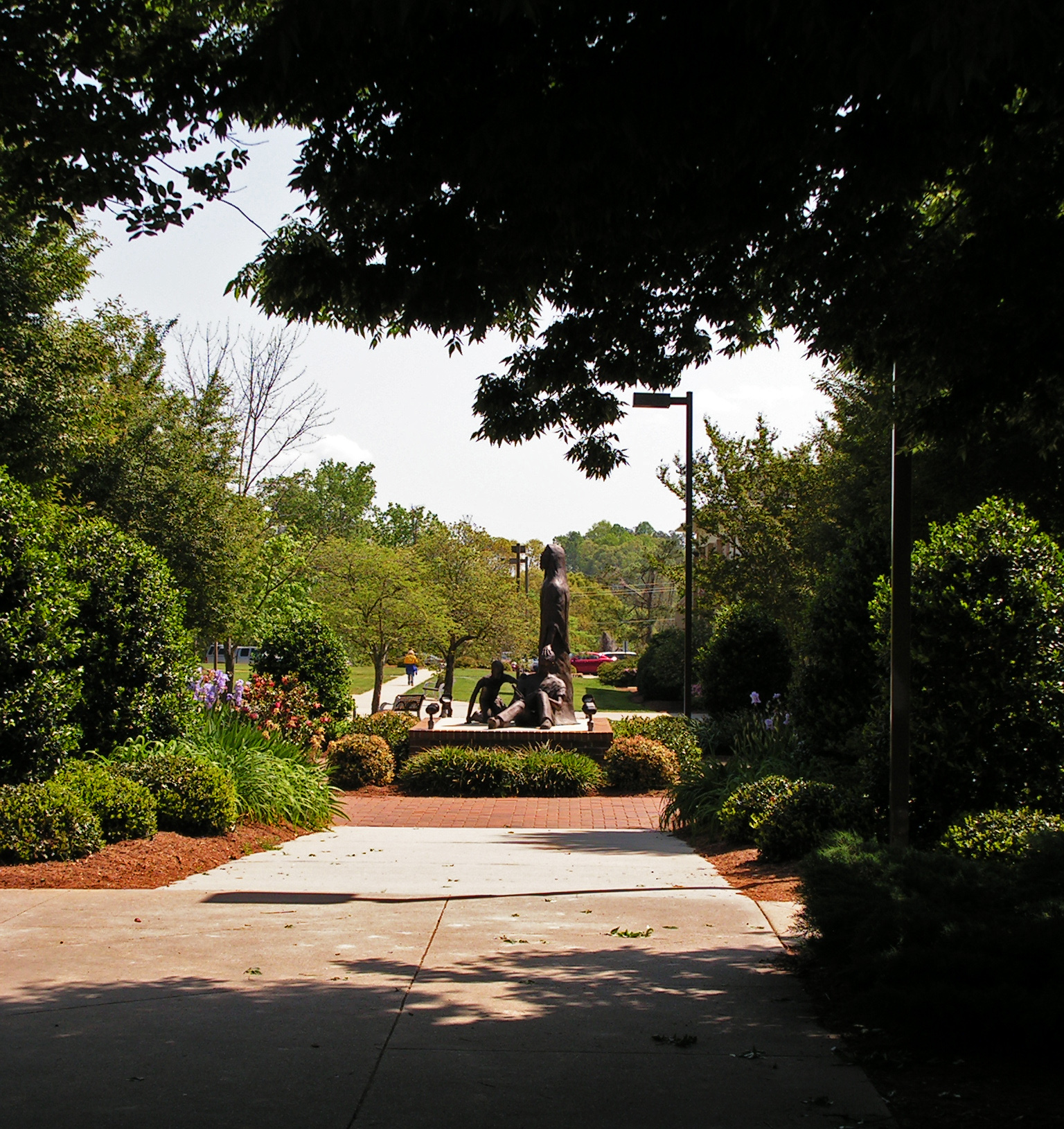
Intercession Square

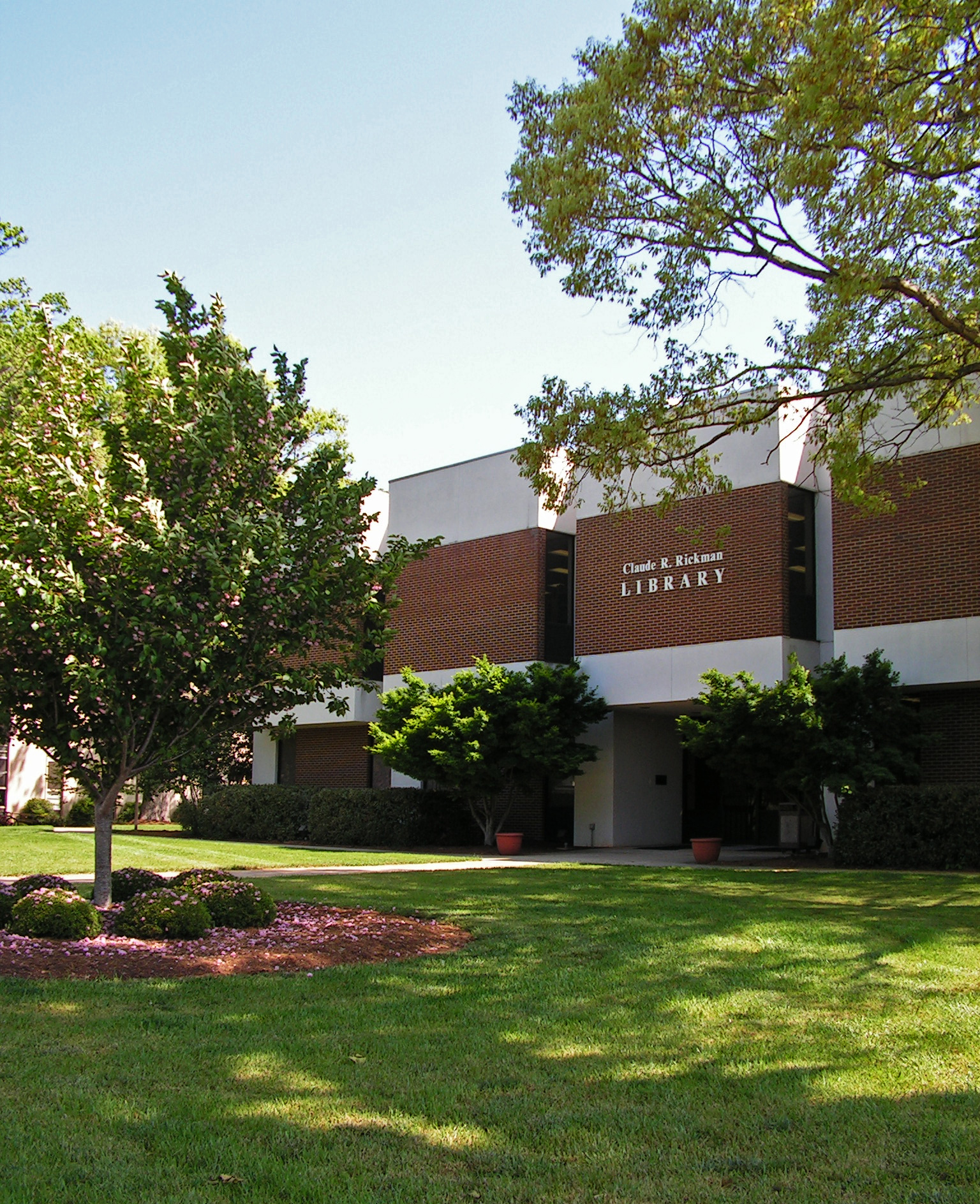
Rickman Library
