= Bulletin for Biblical Research =

- Discipline: Biblical Studies
- Language: English
- Edited by: Dominick S. Hernández

Publication details
- History: 1991-present
- Publisher: Eisenbrauns (USA)
- Frequency: Quarterly

Standard abbreviations
- ISO 4: Bull. Biblic. Res.

Indexing
- ISSN: 1065-223X (print); 2576-0998 (web)
- OCLC no.: 367947997

Links
- Journal homepage

The Bulletin for Biblical Research is the peer-reviewed journal of the Institute for Biblical Research. It was established in 1991, and is published by Eisenbrauns. BBR started as an annual journal, becoming a biannual journal in 2000 and a quarterly journal in 2009. BBR publishes articles in Old Testament/Hebrew Bible and New Testament and sometimes cognate literature, from a range of historical and literary approaches. A significant portion of the journal is dedicated to timely reviews of new publications on these subjects. It is a part of the Scholarly Publishing Collective. The current editor is Miguel G. Echevarría.

== Editors ==
BBR has had five successive editors during its history:

- Bruce Chilton (1991–1994)
- Craig A. Evans (1994–2005)
- Richard S. Hess (2005–2015)
- Craig S. Keener (2015–2021)
- Dominick S. Hernández (2021–2024)
- Miguel G. Echevarría (2024–present)
