= Wesley Biblical Seminary =

Private seminary in Ridgeland, Mississippi

Coordinates: 32.400120°N 90.111362°W

- Motto: Trusted Leaders for Faithful Churches
- Type: Private seminary
- Established: 1974
- Religious affiliation: Multi-denominational Methodist
- Endowment: $4.2 million
- President: Andy Miller III
- Faculty: 7 full-time
- Students: 501
- Location: Ridgeland, Mississippi, United States
- Campus: Urban
- Website: www.wbs.edu

Wesley Biblical Seminary is a private seminary in the Methodist (Wesleyan-Arminian) tradition in Ridgeland, Mississippi. It was founded in 1974 and serves men and women who come from thirty denominations from all across the United States and other countries. WBS is fully virtual offering polysynchronous online learning with headquarters located outside Jackson, Mississippi.

== History ==
The founding of Wesley Biblical Seminary grew out of the need for adequately prepared pastors within the Methodist tradition. In 1974, under the leadership of Ivan C. Howard, the founding president, a group of interested persons representing historic Methodism participated in the establishment of a theological seminary committed to graduate-level educational ministry in the South. On July 22, 1975, Wesley Biblical Seminary was incorporated as an independent, non-profit educational institution with its charter, bylaws, and statement of faith duly adopted at the first board of trustees meeting on September 20, 1975.

The seminary is governed by a board of trustees composed of ministerial and lay leaders. The board includes men and women who are interracial, international, and interdenominational in background. The seminary depends primarily upon gifts and pledges of concerned individuals, groups, and local churches for operational, capital and endowment funding.

== Academics ==
The seminary offers the Master of Divinity, Master of Arts, and Doctor of Ministry degrees. All graduate and post-graduate degrees at WBS are available online and are accredited by the Association of Theological Schools in the United States and Canada (ATS). The College at WBS also offers a Bachelor of Arts in Christian Ministry, accredited by the Association for Biblical Higher Education (ABHE).

== Media ==
The Hour of Holiness is a national 30-minute radio program sponsored by Wesley Biblical Seminary and features William Ury, Adjunct Professor of Systematic Theology. The broadcast can be heard Sunday mornings at 9:30 on American Family Radio.

== Denominations ==
Wesley Biblical Seminary is a multi-denominational institution, though it primarily serves those in the Methodist tradition, including those of the Wesleyan-Holiness movement. It is an approved seminary of the Global Methodist Church.

Wesley Biblical Seminary is attended by many of those seeking higher education for ministry in Methodist denominations of the conservative holiness movement, such as the Evangelical Methodist Church Conference.

The college believes in entire sanctification and Biblical inerrancy.
