= Wesley Seminary =

Evangelical Christian theological seminary in Marion, Indiana

Wesley Seminary at Indiana Wesleyan University
- Established: 2009; 17 years ago
- Affiliations: Wesleyan Church
- Vice-president: Yamil Acevedo
- Dean: Brannon Hancock
- Academic staff: 14
- Administrative staff: 5
- Students: 535
- Location: (United States) Marion, IN, USA; 40.516545°N 85.669430°W
- Website: indwes-edu/seminary
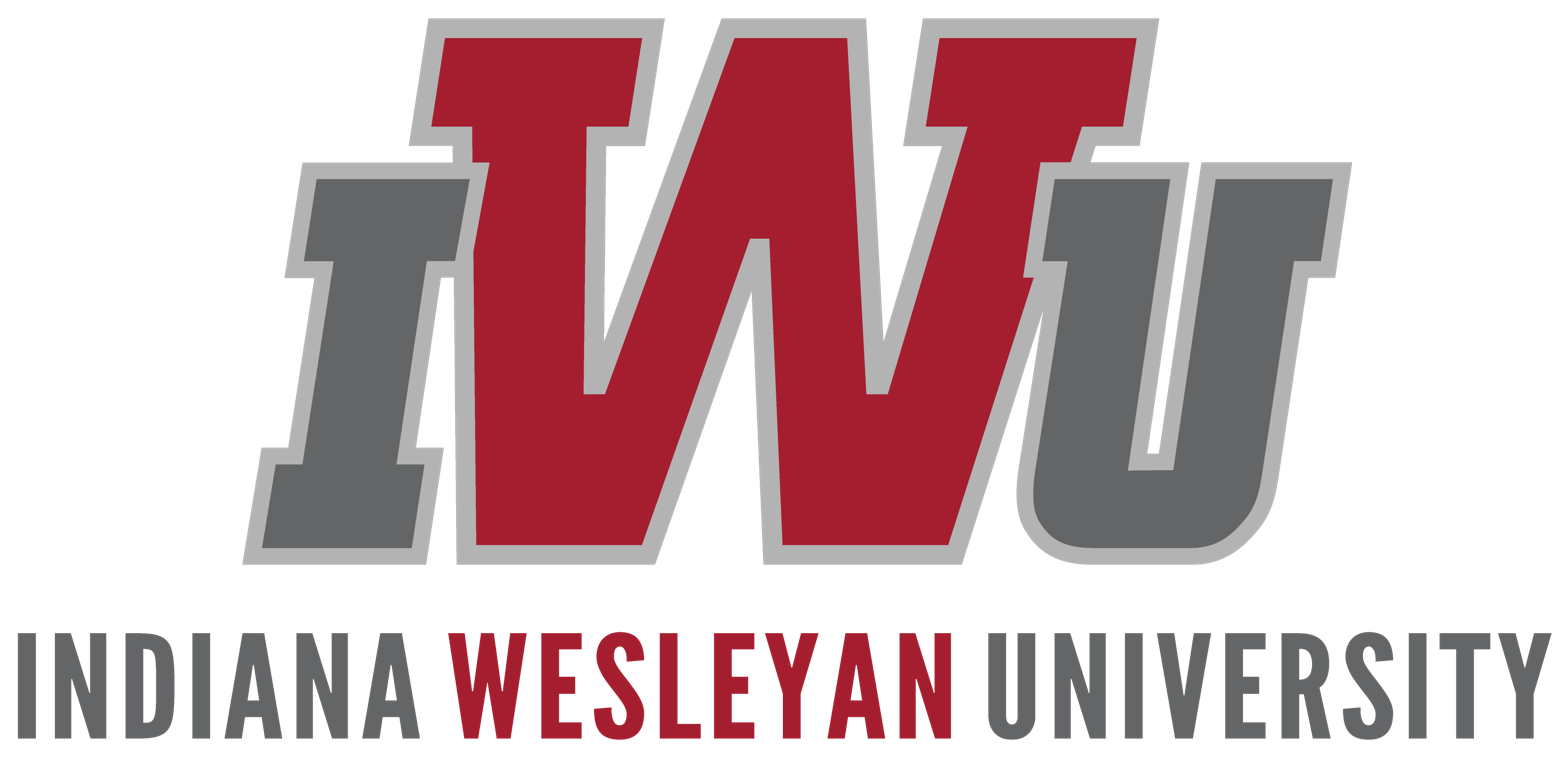

Wesley Seminary is an evangelical Christian theological seminary that was founded by the Wesleyan Church denomination and Indiana Wesleyan University (IWU). Wesley is located in the IWU National and Global headquarters building in Marion, Indiana.

== History ==
In 2008, IWU administrators and the board of trustees endorsed the concept of the seminary and set aside funding for the potential program. On April 3, 2009, the board of trustees unanimously approved the proposal after the seminary was accredited by the Higher Learning Commission of the North Central Association of Colleges and Schools. The seminary opened for the fall 2009 semester. On June 20, 2012, Wesley Seminary was admitted as an Associate Member of the Association of Theological Schools. On October 2, 2009, during IWU's Homecoming Chapel, former IWU president Dr. Henry Smith announced that the board of trustees had officially voted to name the seminary Wesley Seminary at Indiana Wesleyan University and had chosen Dr. Wayne Schmidt to be the seminary's first Vice President.

In 2013 the seminary moved into their new $7 million building on the IWU campus as a result of a donation from the Green family, owners of the Hobby Lobby corporation. However, the seminary is in the process of moving into the existing IWU National and Global headquarters located a short distance from the campus. IWU's admissions department will move into the seminary building.

Wesley is the first officially affiliated seminary in the history of the Wesleyan Church, which does not currently require pastors to hold a seminary degree for ordination. In 2009, only about 15 percent of Wesleyan pastors have seminary degrees. Denominational leaders hoped the creation of Wesley Seminary would double that number. Wesley Seminary ranks in size within the top 10 percent of the Association of Theological Schools’ accredited seminaries. Wesley currently employs 11 full-time faculty, 10 administrative staff members, and 3 executive administrators.

Wesley launched a Doctor of Ministry program in 2016. The first cohort began in June, when students traveled to Atlanta to learn about the foundations of urban, rural, and suburban leadership from nationally acclaimed pastors and Christian leaders. Subsequent cohorts in 2017 and 2018 focused on preaching and spiritual formation, respectively.

In June 2016, Wesley Seminary Vice President Wayne Schmidt accepted the position of General Superintendent of the Wesleyan Church. As a result, Jo Anne Lyon was named Interim Vice President of Wesley Seminary. In May 2017, Associate Professor of Congregational Formation Rev. Colleen Derr was appointed President of Wesley Seminary and sits on the Executive Council of Indiana Wesleyan University as an Executive Vice President.

== Accreditation ==
Wesley Seminary is accredited by the Higher Learning Commission of the North Central Association of Colleges and Schools. It also received accreditation from the Association of Theological Schools in 2014.

== Academics ==
The seminary offers a Master of Divinity degree program, along with other graduate theology degrees, offered in on-site and online formats.

- Master of Divinity (M.Div.)
- Master of Arts in Ministry (M.A.) with six specialization options
- Master of Practical Theology
- Doctor of Ministry (D.Min.) with three specializations
