= National Register of Historic Places listings in Jessamine County, Kentucky =

Location of Jessamine County in Kentucky

This is a list of the National Register of Historic Places listings in Jessamine County, Kentucky.

This is intended to be a complete list of the properties and districts on the National Register of Historic Places in Jessamine County, Kentucky, United States. The locations of National Register properties and districts for which the latitude and longitude coordinates are included below, may be seen in a map.

There are 76 properties and districts listed on the National Register in the county, of which one is a National Historic Landmark.

This National Park Service list is complete through NPS recent listings posted December 12, 2025.

== Current listings ==
	Name on the Register	Image	Date listed	Location	City or town	Description
1	Asbury College Administration Building	Asbury College Administration Building	July 6, 1985 (#85001532)	Kentucky Route 29; 37°51′49″N 84°39′43″W	Wilmore	Part of the Asbury College campus; renamed the "Hager Administration Building" in 1993.
2	Barkley House		July 5, 1984 (#84001590)	U.S. Route 68; 37°54′22″N 84°37′01″W	Nicholasville	
3	Isaac Barkley House		July 5, 1984 (#84001594)	Kentucky Route 169; 37°54′52″N 84°36′32″W	Nicholasville	
4	Bethel Academy Site (15JS80)		March 15, 1984 (#84001597)	Atop bluffs above the Kentucky River at High Bridge, 4 miles from Wilmore; 37°49′20″N 84°42′18″W	Wilmore	Site of the first Methodist school west of the Appalachians
5	Bicknell House		July 5, 1984 (#84001600)	Kentucky Route 29; 37°51′13″N 84°40′21″W	Wilmore	
6	Brick House on Shun Pike	Brick House on Shun Pike	July 5, 1984 (#84001601)	Off Kentucky Route 1268; 37°50′33″N 84°37′03″W	Nicholasville	
7	J.S. Bronaugh House		July 5, 1984 (#84001603)	103 N. 2nd St. 37°52′53″N 84°34′28″W	Nicholasville	
8	George I. Brown House	George I. Brown House	December 2, 1977 (#77000632)	206 Linden Lane; 37°52′22″N 84°34′43″W	Nicholasville	
9	George and Betty Bryan House	George and Betty Bryan House	July 5, 1984 (#84001606)	U.S. Route 68; 37°53′23″N 84°39′17″W	Nicholasville	
10	Bryant House		July 6, 1985 (#85001541)	U.S. Route 27; 37°55′32″N 84°33′43″W	Nicholasville	
11	Burrier House		July 13, 1984 (#84001607)	North of Keene; 37°57′57″N 84°37′04″W	Keene	
12	Butler's Tavern	Butler's Tavern	July 5, 1984 (#84001608)	U.S. Route 27; 37°50′41″N 84°35′16″W	Nicholasville	
13	Camp Nelson	Camp Nelson	March 15, 2001 (#00000861)	U.S. Route 27; 37°47′16″N 84°35′53″W	Nicholasville	
14	Camp Nelson National Cemetery	Camp Nelson National Cemetery	September 3, 1998 (#98001134)	6890 Danville Rd. 37°47′07″N 84°35′59″W	Nicholasville	
15	Canewood Farm		April 29, 1999 (#99000494)	8080 Harrodsburg Rd. 37°53′43″N 84°38′15″W	Nicholasville	
16	Chaumiere des Prairies	Chaumiere des Prairies	September 25, 1975 (#75000780)	North of Nicholasville off U.S. Route 68; 37°56′37″N 84°35′04″W	Nicholasville	
17	Joseph Chrisman House		July 5, 1984 (#84001618)	U.S. Route 27; 37°54′49″N 84°33′12″W	Nicholasville	
18	Confederate Memorial in Nicholasville	Confederate Memorial in Nicholasville	July 17, 1997 (#97000686)	Courthouse lawn, junction of U.S. Route 27 and Kentucky Route 29; 37°52′51″N 84°34′24″W	Nicholasville	
19	Joseph Crockett House		February 11, 2011 (#83004587)	Kentucky Route 169 at Union Mills	Nicholasville	Early Stone Buildings of Central Kentucky Thematic Resource
20	Curd House	Curd House	July 13, 1984 (#84001621)	Kentucky Route 29; 37°49′55″N 84°42′04″W	Wilmore	
21	J.W. Duncan House		July 5, 1984 (#84001622)	Kentucky Route 169; 37°54′00″N 84°34′49″W	Nicholasville	
22	Nathaniel Dunn House		March 7, 1979 (#79001015)	North of Nicholasville off U.S. Route 68; 37°57′06″N 84°35′32″W	Nicholasville	
23	East Main Street Historic District	East Main Street Historic District	August 5, 1994 (#94000840)	Roughly E. Main St. from S. Walnut St. to Rice St. 37°51′32″N 84°39′35″W	Wilmore	
24	Ebenezer Presbyterian Church	Ebenezer Presbyterian Church	June 23, 1983 (#83002797)	Off Kentucky Route 1267; 37°55′49″N 84°41′04″W	Keene	
25	Federal House on Hickman Creek		July 6, 1985 (#85001542)	West of Logana; 37°52′17″N 84°29′57″W	Logana	
26	First Vineyard		September 29, 2015 (#15000656)	5800 Sugar Creek Pike; 37°44′37″N 84°33′52″W	Nicholasville	
27	Fort Bramlette		June 13, 1975 (#75000781)	Off Fort Bramlette Road, south of Nicholasville; 37°45′56″N 84°35′28″W	Nicholasville	
28	Glass Mill Complex		January 13, 2025 (#100011310)	1995 Glass Mill Road; 37°50′30″N 84°38′44″W	Wilmore	
29	Glass Mill Road Four Arch Bridge		April 23, 2024 (#100010245)	On Glass Mill Road crossing Jessamine Creek; 37°50′32″N 84°38′42″W	Wilmore	
30	A. Grubb House		July 5, 1984 (#84001626)	Kentucky Route 169; 37°52′16″N 84°26′17″W	Spears	
31	Hoover House	Hoover House	July 5, 1984 (#84001629)	U.S. Route 27; 37°51′47″N 84°34′55″W	Nicholasville	
32	Hughes House		July 5, 1984 (#84001632)	Kentucky Route 169; 37°57′26″N 84°40′22″W	Keene	
33	John Hunter House		July 6, 1985 (#85001540)	South of Logana; 37°50′32″N 84°29′23″W	Logana	
34	Ephriam January House	Ephriam January House	June 23, 1983 (#83002798)	Address Restricted	Keene	
35	Keene Springs Hotel		July 5, 1984 (#84001636)	Kentucky Route 1267; 37°56′37″N 84°37′38″W	Keene	
36	Kenyon Avenue Historic District	Kenyon Avenue Historic District	August 5, 1994 (#94000841)	401, 403, 405, 406, 407, and 408 Kenyon Ave. 37°51′52″N 84°39′48″W	Wilmore	
37	Grant Knight House		July 5, 1984 (#84001639)	Kentucky Route 169; 37°55′10″N 84°36′40″W	Nicholasville	
38	John Lancaster House		June 23, 1983 (#83002799)	Kentucky Route 169; 37°57′12″N 84°39′09″W	Keene	
39	Lexington and Main Historic District	Lexington and Main Historic District	August 5, 1994 (#94000842)	100, 101, 102, 103, and 105 N. Lexington Ave. and 101 E. Main St. 37°51′41″N 84°39′43″W	Wilmore	
40	Locust Grove Stock Farm		July 5, 1984 (#84001642)	North of Keene; 37°57′59″N 84°37′28″W	Keene	
41	Log House on Shun Pike	Log House on Shun Pike	July 5, 1984 (#84001645)	Off Kentucky Route 1268; 37°50′45″N 84°37′03″W	Nicholasville	
42	William C. Lowry House		July 5, 1984 (#84001647)	Off Kentucky Route 169; 37°55′53″N 84°36′37″W	Nicholasville	
43	Marshall-Bryan House	Marshall-Bryan House	July 5, 1984 (#84001653)	U.S. Route 27; 37°56′55″N 84°32′22″W	Nicholasville	
44	James G. Martin House		July 5, 1984 (#84001654)	Tates Creek Rd. 37°54′38″N 84°27′51″W	Nicholasville	
45	Lewis Y. Martin House		February 7, 2008 (#08000009)	6975 Tates Creek Pk. 37°54′37″N 84°27′24″W	Nicholasville	
46	McClure-Shelby House		November 20, 1978 (#78001372)	5 miles (8 km) east of Nicholasville on Kentucky Route 169; 37°53′15″N 84°28′49″W	Nicholasville	
47	McConnell-Woodson-Philips House	McConnell-Woodson-Philips House	July 5, 1984 (#84001657)	303 S. Main St. 37°52′38″N 84°34′29″W	Nicholasville	
48	Morrison-Kenyon Library	Morrison-Kenyon Library	July 6, 1985 (#85001539)	Kentucky Route 29; 37°51′48″N 84°39′46″W	Wilmore	Part of the Asbury College campus; now a student union.
49	Mt. Pleasant Baptist Church		July 5, 1984 (#84001659)	North of Keene; 37°56′50″N 84°37′47″W	Keene	
50	Nave-Brown House	Nave-Brown House	July 5, 1984 (#84001663)	Kentucky Route 29; 37°53′16″N 84°36′06″W	Nicholasville	
51	Davis Newman House		July 5, 1984 (#84001669)	West of Spears; 37°52′20″N 84°26′37″W	Spears	
52	Nicholasville Historic District	Nicholasville Historic District	July 19, 1984 (#84001674)	Court Row, Maple and Main Sts. 37°52′51″N 84°34′26″W	Nicholasville	
53	North Lexington Avenue Historic District	North Lexington Avenue Historic District	August 5, 1994 (#94000843)	Roughly N. Lexington Ave. from College Ave. to Banta Ln. 37°52′00″N 84°39′29″W	Wilmore	
54	George O'Neal House		July 6, 1985 (#85001538)	Off U.S. Route 68; 37°56′43″N 84°36′34″W	Nicholasville	
55	James O'Neal House		July 6, 1985 (#85001537)	Off Kentucky Route 169; 37°56′02″N 84°36′28″W	Nicholasville	
56	Payne-Saunders House	Payne-Saunders House	July 25, 1996 (#96000799)	503 N. Central Ave. 37°53′02″N 84°34′08″W	Nicholasville	
57	Pleasant Grove		July 5, 1984 (#84001678)	North of Keene; 37°57′19″N 84°37′44″W	Keene	
58	Providence Church	Providence Church	July 5, 1984 (#84001682)	U.S. Route 27; 37°57′28″N 84°32′15″W	Nicholasville	
59	Roberts Chapel	Roberts Chapel	July 5, 1984 (#84001686)	U.S. Route 27; 37°49′07″N 84°35′47″W	Nicholasville	
60	St. Luke Catholic Church		April 18, 2024 (#100010244)	304 South Main Street; 37°52′35″N 84°34′28″W	Nicholasville	
61	Sandy Bluff	Sandy Bluff	July 13, 1984 (#84001689)	Off Kentucky Route 1268; 37°51′05″N 84°36′26″W	Nicholasville	
62	Scott House		June 23, 1983 (#83002800)	U.S. Route 27; 37°49′03″N 84°36′11″W	Little Hickman	
63	John Harvey Scott House	John Harvey Scott House	July 13, 1984 (#84001692)	Off U.S. Route 27; 37°49′14″N 84°35′02″W	Nicholasville	
64	Shady Grove		July 6, 1985 (#85001536)	Off U.S. Route 27; 37°57′07″N 84°33′23″W	Nicholasville	
65	Shanklin House		July 6, 1985 (#85001535)	Kentucky Route 169; 37°54′55″N 84°35′33″W	Nicholasville	
66	Robert Steele House		June 23, 1983 (#83002801)	Troy Rd. 37°54′N 84°41′W	Keene	
67	Stone House on Brooklyn Hill		June 23, 1983 (#83002802)	Off U.S. Route 68; 37°52′08″N 84°42′10″W	Wilmore	
68	Stone House on West Hickman	Stone House on West Hickman	June 23, 1983 (#83002803)	Kentucky Route 1980; 37°56′23″N 84°30′33″W	Nicholasville	
69	Sunnyside Farm House	Sunnyside Farm House	July 5, 1984 (#84001695)	U.S. Route 27; 37°57′34″N 84°32′10″W	Nicholasville	
70	Ridge Taylor Farm		July 6, 1985 (#85001534)	Off Kentucky Route 595; 37°48′56″N 84°28′45″W	Nicholasville	
71	Thornwood		July 13, 1984 (#84001697)	Baker Lane; 37°55′16″N 84°34′39″W	Nicholasville	
72	Venable-Todhunter Houses	Venable-Todhunter Houses	July 5, 1984 (#84001781)	Tates Creek Rd. 37°56′22″N 84°28′52″W	Nicholasville	
73	Waveland		July 5, 1984 (#84001587)	2299 Brannon Rd. 37°57′57″N 84°33′45″W	Nicholasville	Formerly listed as Craig Ashurst House.
74	Woodland	Woodland	July 5, 1984 (#84001783)	U.S. Route 27; 37°56′57″N 84°36′07″W	Nicholasville	
75	Young House	Young House	July 13, 1984 (#84001787)	Kentucky Route 29; 37°52′58″N 84°38′31″W	Nicholasville	
76	A.M. Young House		July 6, 1985 (#85001533)	West of Ash Grove Pike; 37°56′21″N 84°29′38″W	Nicholasville	

== See also ==
- List of National Historic Landmarks in Kentucky
- National Register of Historic Places listings in Kentucky
