= Confederate Memorial in Nicholasville =

- U.S. National Register of Historic Places
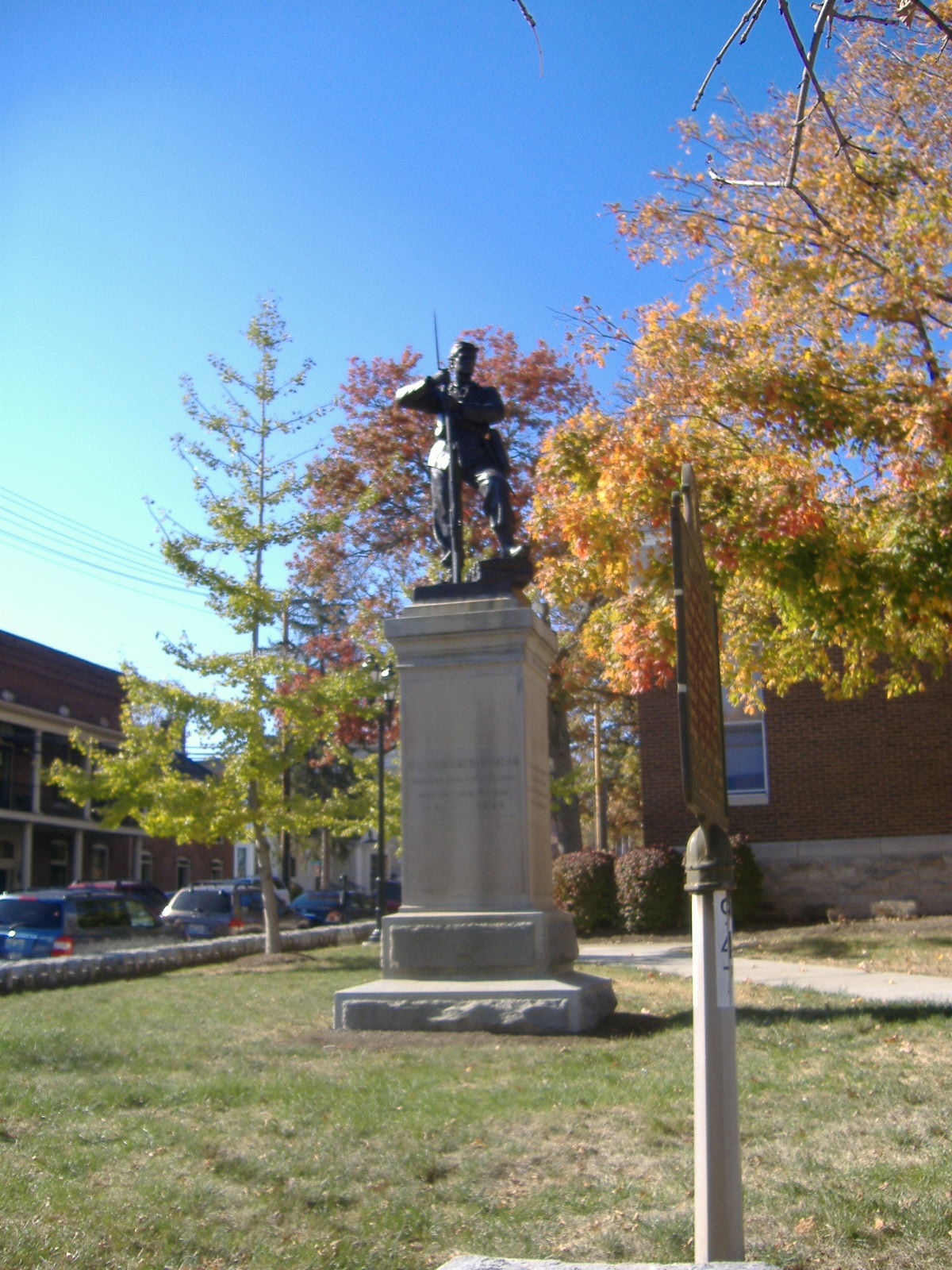

- Location within Kentucky Location within the United States
- Location: Courthouse Lawn. Jct. of US 27 and KY 29, Nicholasville, Kentucky
- Built: 1896
- MPS: Civil War Monuments of Kentucky MPS
- NRHP reference No.: 97000686
- Added to NRHP: July 17, 1997

The Confederate Memorial in Nicholasville is a historic statue created in the Jim Crow era and located on the Jessamine County courthouse lawn in Nicholasville, Kentucky, ten miles south of Lexington, Kentucky.

== Description ==
The memorial consists of an 11-foot-tall (3.4 m) granite pedestal surmounted by a 7-foot-tall (2.1 m) bronze "Confederate" soldier statue with knapsack and kepi hat. There are inscriptions on all four sides of the pedestal, including two direct passages and one slightly modified passage from Bivouac of the Dead.

The process for erecting the statue commenced in 1880, when Jefferson Oxley, a veteran of the Confederate Army, started the Jessamine County Memorial Association to fund such a statue. Sixteen years later it had still not been built. The Association was told there was a Union soldier monument which had not been paid for, and could be theirs at a discount. For $1,500 (equivalent to $58,000 in 2025) the monument was purchased, and the Yankee was "galvanized" into a Confederate soldier.

At the dedication, over 3,500 spectators came to witness the occasion, including 160 from Louisville who came by special train. Among the Louisvillians was Bennett H. Young, a Confederate war criminal and "Lost Cause" advocate who spoke at many such statue dedications. The statue was unveiled by Oxley's son Lawson, as Jefferson Oxley had died.

== National Register of Historic Places ==
On July 17, 1997, the Confederate Memorial in Nicholasville was one of sixty-one different monuments related to the Civil War in Kentucky placed on the National Register of Historic Places, as part of the Civil War Monuments of Kentucky Multiple Property Submission. It is one of three locations commemorating the Civil War in Jessamine County; the other two are Camp Nelson Civil War Heritage Park and Camp Nelson National Cemetery.

== Gallery ==
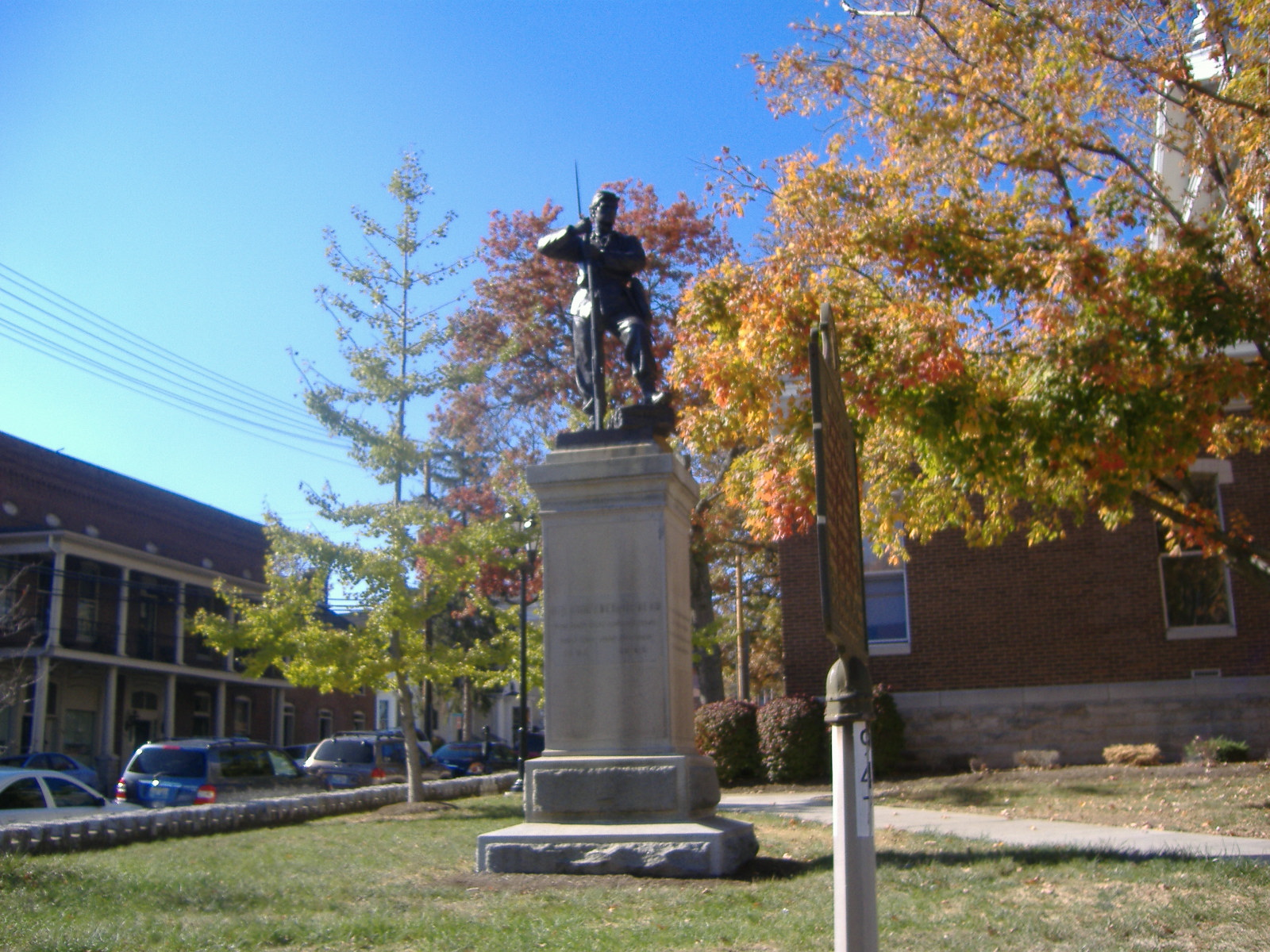
Front view

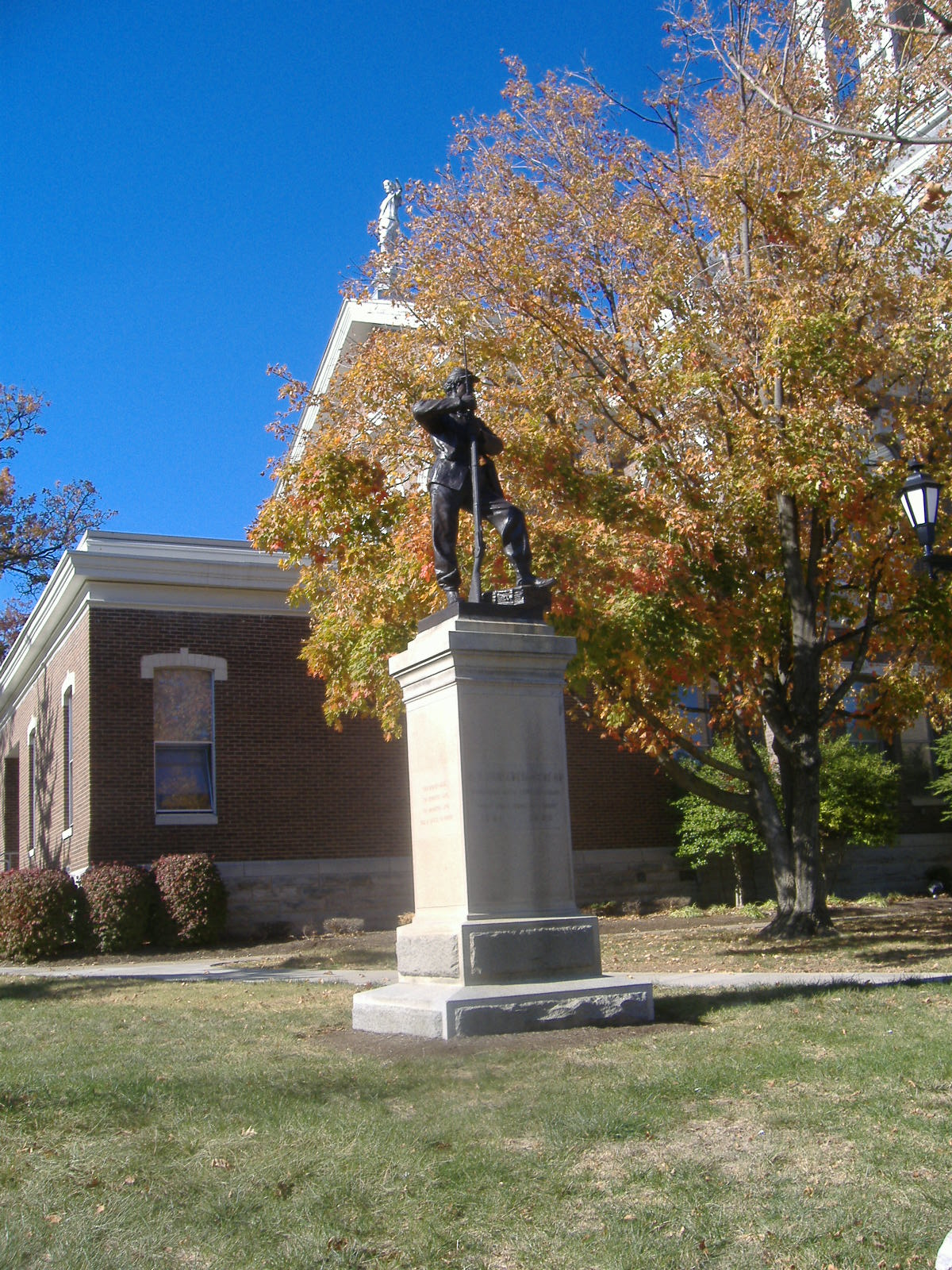
Front view

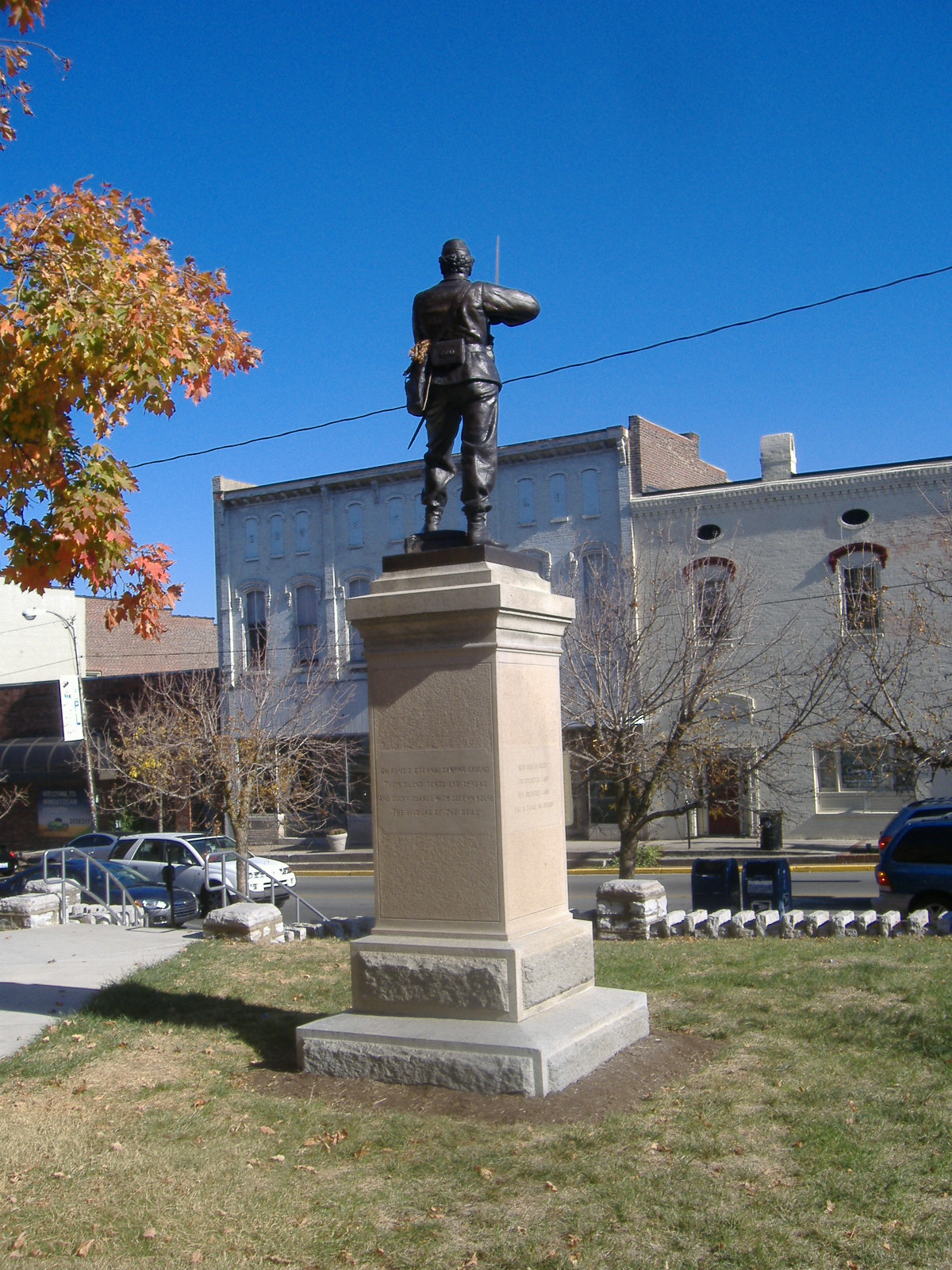
Back view
