= High Bridge, Kentucky =

Unincorporated community in Kentucky, United States

- Census-designated place
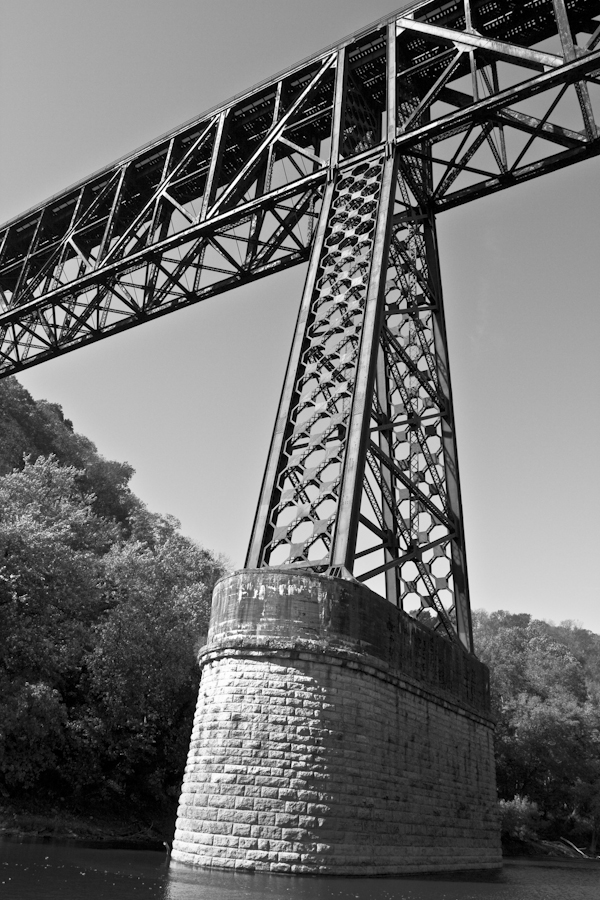
- High Bridge, 2008

- Location within Kentucky Location within the United States
- Coordinates: 37°49′47″N 84°42′35″W
- Country: United States
- State: Kentucky
- County: Jessamine

Area
  - Total: 2.33 sq mi (6.03 km^{2})
  - Land: 2.18 sq mi (5.65 km^{2})
  - Water: 0.15 sq mi (0.38 km^{2})
- Elevation: 863 ft (263 m)

Population (2020)
  - Total: 268
  - Density: 122.9/sq mi (47.47/km^{2})
- Time zone: UTC-5 (Eastern (EST))
  - Summer (DST): UTC-4 (EDT)
- Area code: 859
- FIPS code: 21-36460
- GNIS feature ID: 2629630

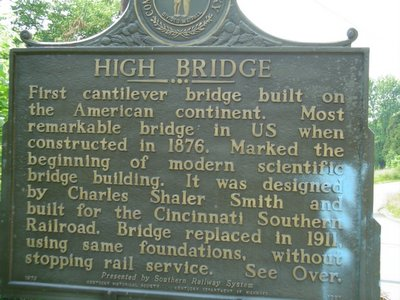
High Bridge historical marker

High Bridge is an unincorporated community and census-designated place in Jessamine County, Kentucky, United States. As of the 2020 census, High Bridge had a population of 268. It lies along the lower reaches of the Kentucky River across from the confluence of the Dix River with the Kentucky. The community is part of the Lexington–Fayette Metropolitan Statistical Area.

== History ==
A post office was established in 1879 in the community then known as "North Tower". In 1888, the town was renamed for the landmark High Bridge, a 275-foot-high (84 m) railroad bridge over the Kentucky River. The first bridge was planned by John Roebling as a suspension bridge, but ultimately built as a cantilever bridge. The current bridge, the second one on these foundations, is the highest railroad bridge in the United States over a navigable river. The Kentucky River runs through the Kentucky River Palisades for much of the lower portion of its length. Most of the bridges over it in the area are relatively high ones.

High Bridge was opened in 1876 and was the first cantilever bridge in North America. Standing 275 feet (84 m) over the river between the Palisades, it first carried both passenger and freight trains. The American Society of Civil Engineers has designated it a National Historic Civil Engineering Landmark. The 1876 bridge was replaced in 1911 by a more robust bridge in the same place. This is the current bridge, which stands 308 feet (94 m) above the river. Freight trains of the Norfolk Southern Railway still use this bridge several times a day.

The Palisades were a popular spot for picnics and dances, as breezes from the river gorge kept it comfortable. An open-air roofed ballroom was built there for community dances and has been preserved. A small playground and park adjoin the Palisades property.

A brand of bottled water named for the community depicts the bridge on its label. Highbridge Springs water is well known to the University of Kentucky Wildcats. The Wildcat mascot is used on the bottle label to show support for the team. The bottle name is "Swish".

Bethel Academy, the first Methodist school west of the Appalachians, was established in the High Bridge vicinity in 1790.

== Geography ==
The High Bridge census-designated place consists of the community of High Bridge as well as rural land comprising the inside of the bend on the Kentucky River where the bridge is located. Kentucky Route 29 leads northeast from High Bridge 4.5 miles (7.2 km) to Wilmore, and Nicholasville, the Jessamine county seat, is 10 miles (16 km) northeast of High Bridge.

According to the U.S. Census Bureau, the High Bridge CDP has a total area of 2.3 square miles (6.0 km^{2}), of which 2.2 square miles (5.6 km^{2}) are land and 0.2 square miles (0.4 km^{2}), or 6.36%, are water.

== Demographics ==
Historical population
Census	Pop.	Note	%±
2020	268		—
U.S. Decennial Census

As of the 2020 census, there were 268 people, 120 housing units, and 51 families in the CDP. The racial makeup was 93.0% White, 0.3% Asian, 0.7% from some other race, and 6.0% from two or more races. Those of Hispanic or Latino origin made up 4.1% of the population.

The ancestry of the CDP was 79.3% American, 3.4% Irish, and 2.3% German.

The median age was 59.2 years old. The average family size was 1.97 people per household. The median household income was $30,750. 17.2% of the population were in poverty.
