= Young House (Nicholasville, Kentucky) =

Historic house in Kentucky, United States

- U.S. National Register of Historic Places
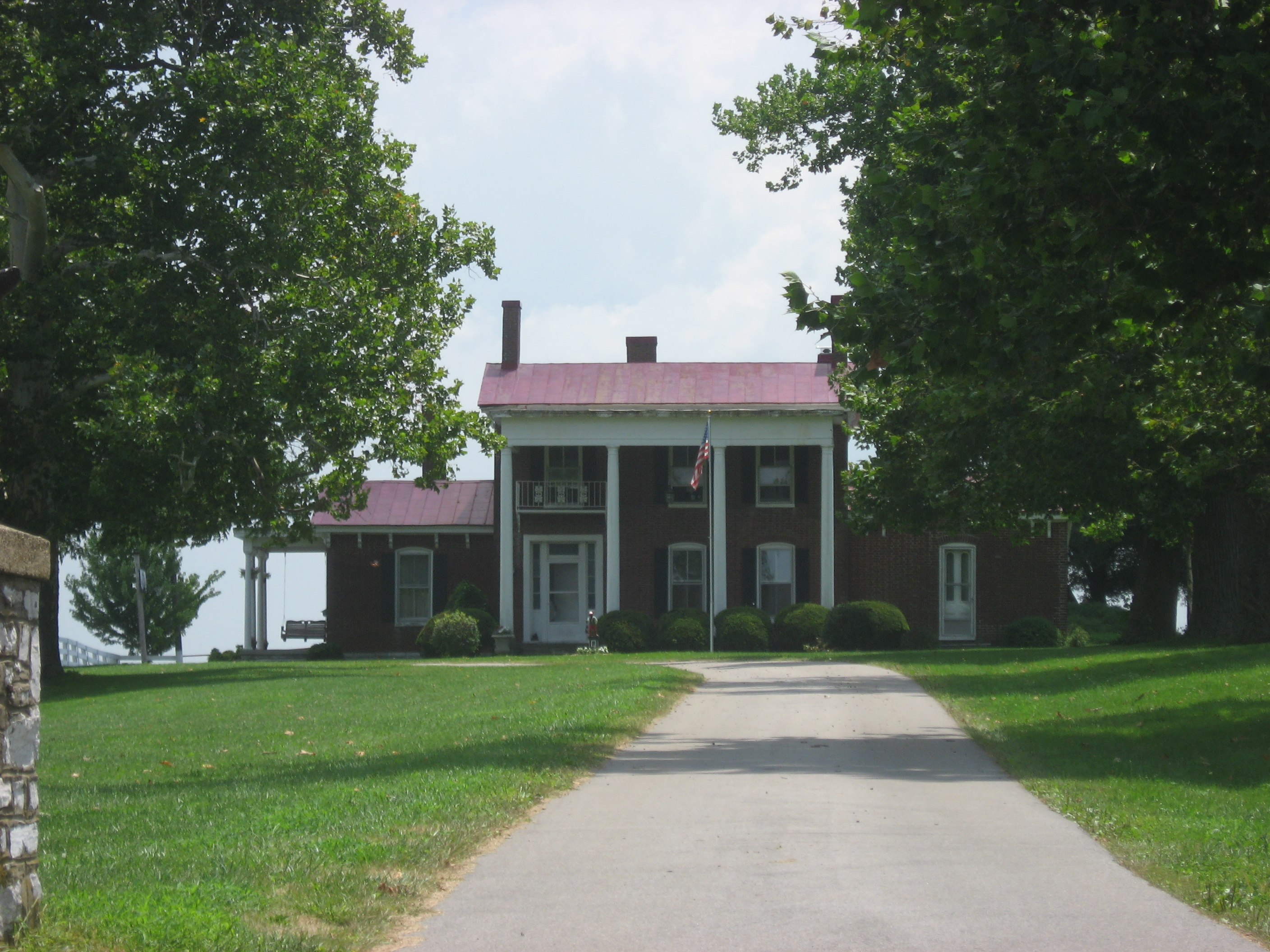
- Front of the house

- Location within Kentucky Location within the United States
- Nearest city: Wilmore, Kentucky
- Coordinates: 37°52′58″N 84°38′31″W
- Area: 150 acres (61 ha)
- Architectural style: Italianate
- MPS: Jessamine County MRA
- NRHP reference No.: 84001787
- Added to NRHP: July 13, 1984

The Young House is an historic estate in Jessamine County, Kentucky, United States, between Nicholasville and Wilmore off of Kentucky Route 29 on Lexington Road. Popular legend has it that the house was the birthplace of Bennett H. Young, an American Civil War soldier, lawyer, and architect.

== History ==
The house pictured here is the former house of Dr. Brown Young. He was the son of Dr. Archibald and Martha Young, who lived in the home adjacent to the north. Archibald was apparently either the brother or the cousin of Robert Young (there was more than one), and both of them were among the several sons of John Young, who had been a revolutionary War soldier.

Brown Young married Emline Drake, whose family owned the property adjacent to the south of the B. Young house. Brown and Emline had a daughter, Adelia (b. 1846), who married a Leonard Willis. According to the Lamont Family DNA study, the Youngs may also have had a son named Samuel (b. 1849), but there is no mention of this son in the biographical sketch of Dr. Brown Young in Kentucky: A History of the State (Battle, et al., 1887), so he may have died in infancy or childhood.

The 150 acres is now a working Angus farm named Sycamore Hill in reference to the Sycamore trees that line the driveway. The property is owned by the Ashbrook family although they do not occupy the main house. It is rented as a single family home.

The property was placed on the United States National Register of Historic Places on July 13, 1984.

== Architecture ==
The Young House was supposedly built between 1814 and 1820, and is decorated in the Italianate style. The two-story, nine-room house has 18 -inch-thick brick exterior walls and is now a total of approximately 3600 square feet in size. It has wide-plank, ash wood flooring.
