= Bethel Academy =

- Bethel Academy Site (15JS80)
- U.S. National Register of Historic Places
- Location within Kentucky Location within the United States
- Location: On cliffs above a bend in the Kentucky River near High Bridge, four miles south of Wilmore
- Nearest city: Wilmore, Kentucky
- Coordinates: 37°49′20″N 84°42′18″W
- Area: 0.4 acres (0.16 ha)
- Built: 1790
- NRHP reference No.: 84001597
- Added to NRHP: March 15, 1984

Bethel Academy was the first Methodist school established in the United States west of the Appalachian Mountains. Established by Francis Asbury in 1790, the school operated in present-day Jessamine County, Kentucky until 1805.

== Establishment ==
In 1789, Methodists in Kentucky (then the western part of the state of Virginia) appealed to Bishop Asbury for assistance in establishing a school. Asbury promised aid conditional upon his memorialists' ability to secure at least 5,000 acres (2,000 ha) of land. Accordingly, he embarked for Kentucky in the spring of 1790, reaching Lexington on the 12th of May. After meeting with local Methodists and establishing the Kentucky Conference, Asbury departed for Jessamine County.

There he met with Thomas Lewis, who donated sufficient land to found the school. With the assistance of Francis Poythress and John Metcalf, Asbury completed arrangements for the school. Founded in 1790 under the name of Bethel Academy, it was the first Methodist school in the United States west of the Appalachians, and the second in the nation.

== Years of operation ==
Poythress directed the construction of the school building on the land given by Lewis. Located on bluffs overlooking a bend in the Kentucky River, near where the late-19th century High Bridge was constructed, the three-story structure sat in a prominent location. It was described by a later writer as strikingly beautiful and convenient for the establishment of a community. The school was completed in time for classes in 1794, with John Metcalf appointed as principal. The school was incorporated by an act of the Kentucky legislature in 1798. Both before and after it opened, Bethel was a center of Methodism in central Kentucky. It hosted a return visit by Asbury in 1792 (during which time he advocated for its support), and the Kentucky Conference met at the school in 1797. The school was frequently in competition with Transylvania Academy, then a Presbyterian school.

== Later history and closure ==
In 1803, Principal Metcalf moved to Nicholasville in the center of the county, where he opened a school under the name of "Bethel Academy." After this time, the original Bethel was reduced to a less significant status; it continued under the oversight of Nathaniel Harris until closure in 1805.

Metcalf's school flourished for several decades, attaining renown as a private school of high quality. By the end of the nineteenth century, after years of extended agricultural depression reduced private wealth in the region, the school was turned over to the state and converted into a public school. When John Wesley Hughes established a Methodist college in the nearby community of Wilmore in 1890, his choice of the name Asbury College was partially inspired by the history of Bethel Academy.

The site of Bethel Academy was listed on the National Register of Historic Places in 1984 as an archaeological site. This reflects the existence of the school building long after its closure; as late as 1898, the site could be found without difficulty. Its ruins were still easily visible.
