= East Jessamine High School =

Coordinates: 37.87652°N 84.55421°W

Location
- 815 Sulphur Well Rd; Nicholasville, Kentucky; 40356; United States

Information
- Type: Public (US)
- Established: 1997
- School district: Jessamine County
- Principal: Chris Hawboldt
- Faculty: 51.6 (FTE)
- Grades: 9–12
- Enrollment: 1,075 (2019–20)
- Student to teacher ratio: 20.83
- Colors: Royal blue and kelly green
- Mascot: Jaguars
- Website: https://www.jessamine.kyschools.us/o/ejhs

East Jessamine High School is a public high school in Nicholasville, Kentucky, United States. It was opened in 1997 by Jessamine County. Prior to this, the school was divided into two separate institutions: East Jessamine High School and West Jessamine High School. It is the fastest growing high school in Jessamine County.

== Academics ==
East Jessamine High School offers the following AP classes:

- Art
- Biology
- Calculus AB
- Calculus BC
- Chemistry
- English Language
- English Literature
- French
- Physics
- Spanish
- Statistics
- US History
- World History
- US Government & Politics
- Psychology

== Extracurricular activities ==
Academics:

- National Merit finalists (2007, 2008, 2009)
- Academic Team
- Forensics Team (2009 Kentucky Forensics League Coach of the Year Joey Mau, 2009 Kentucky Forensics League Student Competitor of the Year Parker Collins)

Athletics:

- Wrestling
- Football
- Volleyball
- Soccer (boys' and girls')
- Basketball (boys' and girls')
- Cross country
- Tennis
- Swimming
- Baseball
- Softball
- Golf (boys' and girls')
- Bowling
- Cheerleading
- Track
- Dance
