= Keene Springs Hotel =

- U.S. National Register of Historic Places
- Location within Kentucky Location within the United States
- Nearest city: Keene, Kentucky
- Coordinates: 37°56′37″N 84°37′38″W
- Built: 1841
- NRHP reference No.: 84001636
- Added to NRHP: 5 July 1984

The Keene Springs Hotel is a rambling wood-frame, two-story Greek Revival-style building built in sections in 1841 by Mason Singleton Jr. in the hamlet of Keene, near Nicholasville, Kentucky in Jessamine County. He and his wife Nancy owned and operated the hotel and tavern as a resort destination for the white sulphur springs nearby. During the cholera epidemic of 1848–1849 and outbreaks in the early 1850s, residents of Lexington came to the hotel to try to escape the spread of disease in the city. The Singletons operated the hotel until 1857, when they sold it to Alfred McTyre.

After the American Civil War, tourist travel decreased because of the poor economy. F.S. Wilson purchased the hotel in 1868 and operated it as a boarding house through the end of the century. In the 20th century until the 1960s, Wilson family descendants used the structure as a general store and residence.

The hotel is privately owned. A lessee operates a restaurant three days a week and is gradually restoring the building. It was listed on the National Register of Historic Places on July 5, 1984.

== History ==
The hotel and tavern were associated with two periods, the development of Jessamine County from 1825 to 1849 and 1850 to 1874. Mason Singleton Jr. and his wife Nancy (Lafon) Singleton had the hotel built to attract travelers. The main part was styled as a Greek Revival wood-frame house. A two-story extension with additional rooms was added to the west.

During the 1840s and 1850s, the hotel attracted residents from Lexington, about five miles to the northeast, as a resort destination. The discovery of white sulphur water nearby about 1848 increased its desirability as a destination. Visitors came for what were believed to be the medicinal qualities of the springs. The hotel and tavern were part of the growth of facilities in the region to house tourists as well as commercial travelers along the major county roads. Captain G. L. Postlethwait was noted as its congenial host.

The nineteenth century had been marked by periodic outbreaks of epidemics of cholera and other infectious diseases, often carried by travelers on the major river systems. It was transmitted through water contaminated by the poor sanitation of the time. During the cholera epidemic of 1848–1849 and outbreaks in the early 1850s, people fled Lexington to stay at the Keene Springs Hotel and other outlying facilities. They hoped to escape the spread of disease in the city, as the cholera transmission vector was not then understood.

In 1857 the Singletons sold their property to A. McTyre and migrated to Texas by wagon. McTyre sold it to F.S. Wilson in 1868 after the American Civil War, when the hotel failed as a resort. It was operated for many years as a boarding house, known as The Maples for the trees in front of its main entrance on SR 1267. In the twentieth century, the Wilson family used the structure as a residence, with a general store, known as Wilson's, in the ground floor. Men in the community regularly gathered there to do business and exchange stories. The building is still owned by Wilson family descendants.

The hotel is listed among Kentucky historic sites; highway marker #1671 is posted in front on KY 1267 (also known as Keene-Troy Pike to the west of 169 and S. Elkhorn Road to the east). The building is at the northwest corner of the junction with Kentucky Route 169 (also called Pinchard Pike to the north of KY 1267). On July 5, 1984, the hotel was listed on the National Register of Historic Places.

The Singletons were each descendants of early pioneers in the county who had migrated from Virginia shortly before 1800. Mason's father, Mason Singleton Sr., came at age 8 with his parents Manoah and Sarah Craig Singleton as part of "The Travelling Church" of 500-600 Baptist and their slaves led in 1781 by Rev. Lewis Craig and Captain William Ellis from Spotsylvania County, Virginia to Kentucky. Mason Sr. built an L-shaped compact brick house in Jessamine County in 1810, which is still standing. The Lafon family were descended from French Huguenot immigrants, who settled in Virginia in 1700 above the falls of the James River.

In 1858 the Singletons migrated from Kentucky to Texas by wagons, taking with them the ten of their fifteen children still living at home, ranging in age from 23 to 6 years old. They first settled in Burnet County where Nancy Lafon Singleton died in 1862. Mason Jr. married three more times in succession, each time after he was widowed. He settled with sons in Travis County, closer to Austin, which became the capital.

As of June 2009, the Keene Springs Hotel is privately owned and used as a residence. The owners lease some of the space for a restaurant that provides home-style dinners three days a week.
