= Mt. Pleasant Baptist Church =

Historic church in Kentucky, United States

- U.S. National Register of Historic Places
- Location within Kentucky Location within the United States
- Location: .5 miles (0.80 km) north of Keene, Kentucky on Keene-Troy Road
- Coordinates: 37°56′50″N 84°37′47″W
- Area: 3.8 acres (1.5 ha)
- Built: 1877
- Architect: Young, Andrew M.
- Architectural style: Late Victorian, Romanesque
- MPS: Jessamine County MRA
- NRHP reference No.: 84001659
- Added to NRHP: July 05, 1984

The Mt. Pleasant Baptist Church near Keene, Kentucky is a historic church.

It began congregating in 1791 as part of the South Elkhorn Baptist Church community, was established as independent in 1801, with the current sanctuary being built in 1877 and added to the National Register in 1984.

It was deemed notable as "one of the few buildings remaining by the local builder A. M. Young", and as the best example of Romanesque Revival style among Jessamine County's rural churches.
