= Ebenezer Presbyterian Church (Keene, Kentucky) =

Historic church in Kentucky, United States

- U.S. National Register of Historic Places
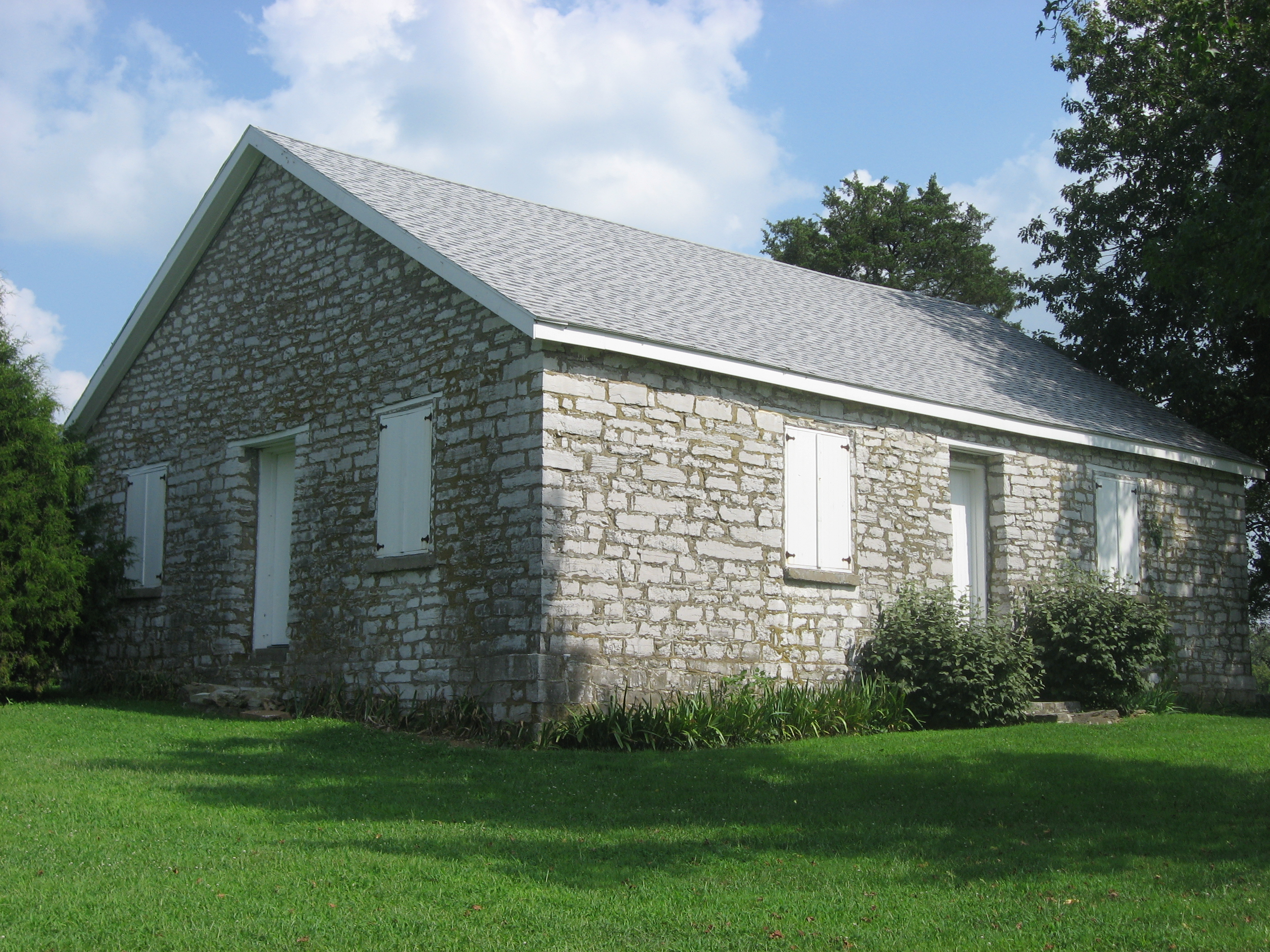
- Northern and western sides of the church

- Location within Kentucky Location within the United States
- Nearest city: Keene, Kentucky
- Coordinates: 37°55′49″N 84°41′4″W
- Area: 2.7 acres (1.1 ha)
- Built: 1803
- Architectural style: Federal
- MPS: Early Stone Buildings of Central Kentucky TR
- NRHP reference No.: 83002797
- Added to NRHP: June 23, 1983

Ebenezer Presbyterian Church is located near Keene, Kentucky in Jessamine County, Kentucky, United States. The first Ebenezer Church on the site was organized by Presbyterian minister Adam Rankin around 1790. The first church building, a log structure, was replaced by a stone building in 1803.

The property was added to the United States National Register of Historic Places on June 23, 1983.

== History ==
Adam Rankin founded Ebenezer Church around 1790. A log building was constructed on property owned by Ephraim January. Robert Hamilton Bishop became the second minister of the church in 1803 when Rankin left. Neal McDougal Gordon, the longest-serving pastor of the church, was installed as minister of Ebenezer Church on May 13, 1843, and served as pastor of the church until 1870.

== Ebenezer Cemetery Association ==
The Ebenezer Cemetery Association was founded in 1922 by descendants of the church founders. The group meets annually on the church grounds for its picnic.

== See also ==
- Ebenezer Church site
- National Register of Historic Places listings in Kentucky
