= Bronaugh =

Bronaugh may refer to:

- James C. Bronaugh (1788–1822), American military surgeon
- Jewel H. Bronaugh, American government official
- J. S. Bronaugh House, a historic house in Kentucky, US
- Bronaugh Apartments, Portland, Oregon, US
- Bronaugh, Missouri, US

== See also ==
- Branagh
