= Robert Hamilton Bishop =

American academic administrator and minister

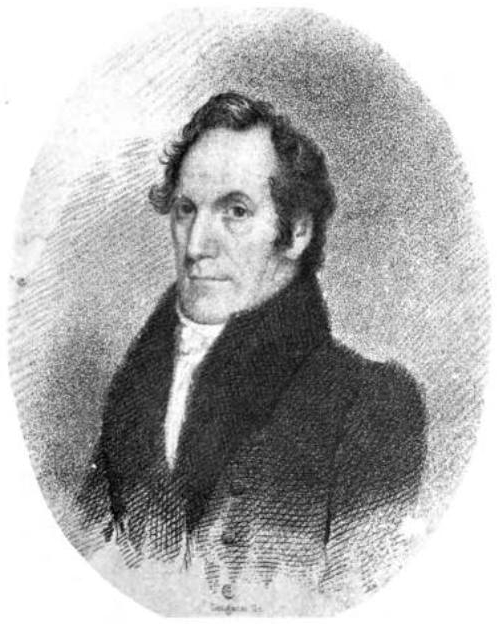

Headmaster of Farmers' College
- In office 1845–1855

President of Miami University
- In office 1824–1841

Personal details
- Born: July 26, 1777 West Lothian, Scotland
- Died: April 29, 1855 (aged 77) Pleasant Hill, Ohio, United States
- Resting place: Miami University
- Education: University of Edinburgh
- Occupation: Educator, minister

Robert Hamilton Bishop (July 26, 1777 – April 29, 1855) was a Scottish-American educator and Presbyterian minister who became the first president of Miami University in Oxford, Ohio. A professor of history and political science, he wrote about the history of the early churches in the United States, as well as theology.

== Early life and education ==
Robert Hamilton Bishop, the son of William Bishop and his wife Margaret Hamilton, was born in West Lothian, Scotland to a highly religious farm family.

When about seventeen years of age, Bishop started at the University of Edinburgh, where he graduated in 1798. When Bishop studied at Edinburgh, such distinguished scholars as David Hume, Adam Smith, Adam Ferguson, and Thomas Reid were part of the faculty. The two men who influenced Bishop the most were Rev. James Finlayson and the philosopher Dugald Stewart.

=== Ordination and ministry ===
From the University of Edinburgh, Bishop went to the Divinity Hall at Selkirk, and was licensed to preach by the Associate Burgher Presbytery of Perth in 1802. Dr. John M. Mason of New York visited the Burgher Synod of Scotland on a recruiting trip as commissioner of the Associate Reformed Presbyterian Synod of North America.

== Career ==
=== Immigration to the United States and ministry ===
In March 1803 Bishop accepted a call from the Ebenezer Church in Jessamine County, Kentucky. While serving as minister at Ebenezer, he was offered a professorship in history at Transylvania University in Lexington, which he accepted. Bishop served as acting president of Transylvania University from 1816 to 1818. James G. Birney was his student at Transylvania.

He was an early sympathizer with the plight of black slaves. In 1815, he organized a Negro school at Pisgah in Woodford County, Kentucky, and in 1816 he opened a school for African-American girls at Transylvania. His 1824 history of the church in Kentucky gave credit to the slaves Peter Durrett and his wife for founding and building up the First African Baptist Church of Lexington, Kentucky. Late-nineteenth century histories noted only white churches in Kentucky.

Rev. Bishop next became a supply preacher at the Second Presbyterian Church of Lexington from 1820 to 1823. He also served as a minister in Versailles, Kentucky.

== First president of Miami University ==
Bishop was selected as the first President of Miami University, founded in Oxford, Ohio, which opened for classes in 1824. He served from 1824 to 1841, when he resigned the presidency. He continued to hold the professorship of history and political science until the autumn of 1844.

In 1845 he became headmaster of Farmers' College in College Hill, Ohio. He died in 1855 and was buried on the grounds of Farmers' College in a mound of earth which came to be known as the "Bishop Mound". More than 100 years later, Bishop's remains were re-interred at Miami University.

== Legacy and honors ==
- In 1830, the Erodelphian Literary Society at Miami University commissioned Hiram Powers to sculpt a bust of Bishop.
- Bishop Hall, the central quad dormitory on the Miami campus, was named in his honor.
- The Bishop Medal, Miami University's highest alumni award, was established in his honor.

Two of Bishop's most famous students were Jefferson Davis at Transylvania and Benjamin Harrison at Farmer's College. He recruited for the Miami faculty, William Holmes McGuffey and John Witherspoon Scott, father-in-law of Benjamin Harrison. Scott spoke at Bishop's funeral saying, in part, "during the changes and controversies originating in skeptical views among those controlling that (Miami) university, there was always one who nobly stood by the faithful Christian soldier, Dr. Bishop, and that was the national statesman, Henry Clay. He continued to implore the directors to retain Dr. Bishop, for, if they did not have one praying man in the university it surely would go down."

== Books ==
Dr. Bishop was a prolific writer. His chief works were:

- An Apology for Calvinism, 1804
- An Outline of the History of the Church in the State of Kentucky, During a Period of Forty Years (containing the memoir of Rev. David Rice), T.T. Skillman, 1824
- Elements of Logic, 1833
- Sketches of the Philosophy of the Bible, 1833
- The Western Peacemaker, 1839

Preceded by first president	President of Miami University; 1824–1841	Succeeded by George Junkin
