= John Hunter House (Logana, Kentucky) =

Historic house in Kentucky, United States

- U.S. National Register of Historic Places
- Location within Kentucky Location within the United States
- Location: In Jessamine County, Kentucky, south of Logana, Kentucky
- Coordinates: 37°50′32″N 84°29′23″W
- Area: 104 acres (42 ha)
- Built: 1792
- Architectural style: Federal
- MPS: Jessamine County MRA
- NRHP reference No.: 85001540
- Added to NRHP: July 6, 1985

The John Hunter House in Jessamine County, Kentucky, near Logana, Kentucky, was built in 1792. It has also been known as the Old County Poor Farm. It was listed on the National Register of Historic Places in 1985.

It was built for one of the first two European-descent settlers in the county, John Jacob Hunter. The house was used for a time as a county poor farm during the late 1800s and early 1900s.
