= McClure–Shelby House =

Historic house in Kentucky, United States

- McClure-Shelby House
- U.S. National Register of Historic Places
- Location within Kentucky Location within the United States
- Nearest city: Nicholasville, Kentucky
- Coordinates: 37°53′15″N 84°28′49″W
- Area: 33 acres (13 ha)
- Built: c.1840
- Architectural style: Greek Revival, Federal
- NRHP reference No.: 78001372
- Added to NRHP: November 20, 1978

The McClure–Shelby House near Nicholasville, Kentucky was built in c. 1840. It includes elements of Greek Revival architecture and Federal architecture. The 33-acre (13 ha) property was listed on the National Register of Historic Places in 1978. It then included three contributing buildings.

The house was built for farmer and landowner Andrew McClure. His daughter, Sarah B. McClure, later married Isaac Shelby, a grandson of Isaac Shelby, first governor of the Kentucky.
