= Roberts Chapel United Methodist Church =

Historic church in Kentucky, United States

- Roberts Chapel
- U.S. National Register of Historic Places
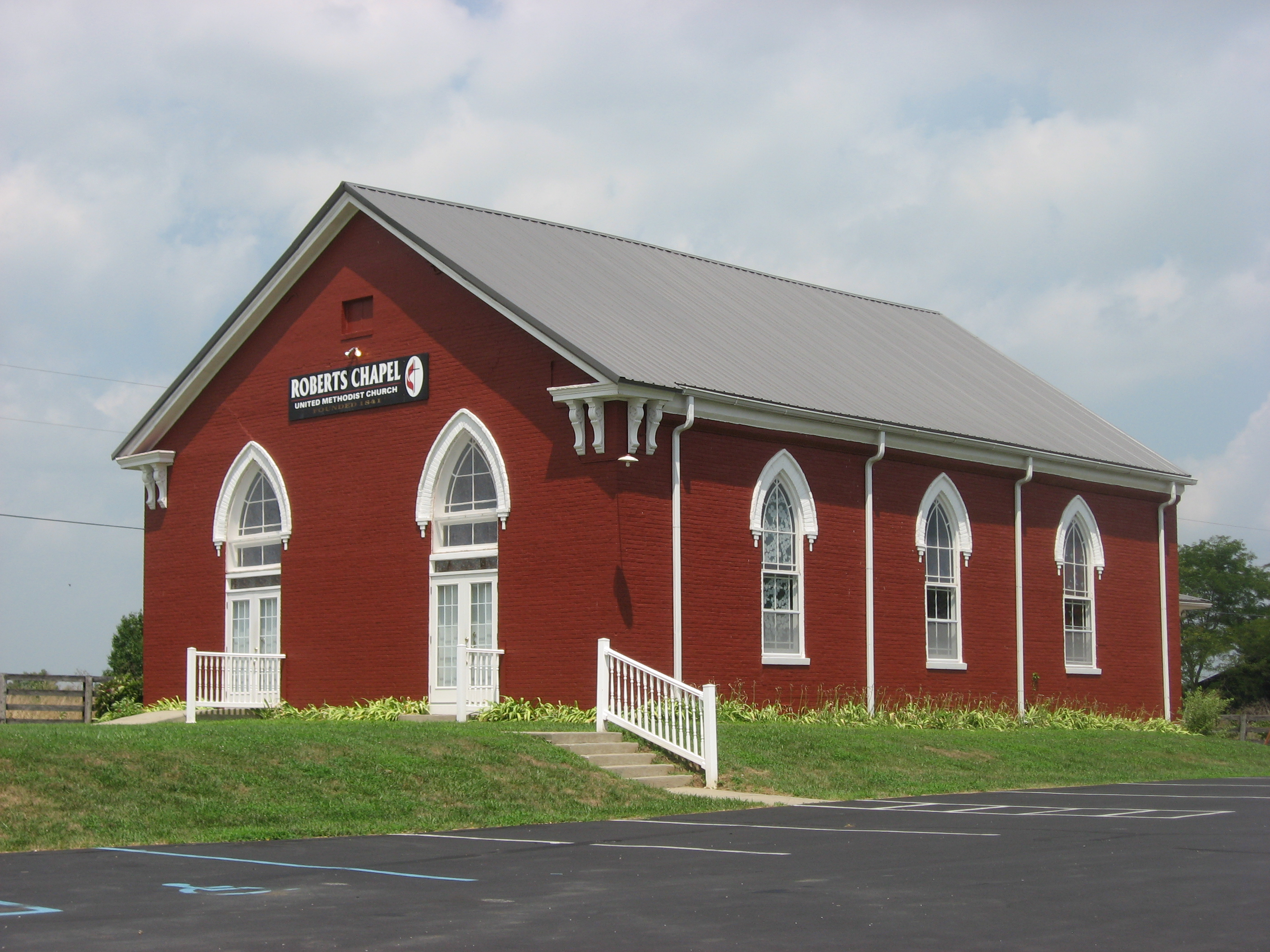

- Location within Kentucky Location within the United States
- Nearest city: Nicholasville, Kentucky
- Coordinates: 37°49′7″N 84°35′47″W
- Area: 1.4 acres (0.57 ha)
- Built: 1845
- Architectural style: Greek Revival, Gothic Revival
- MPS: Jessamine County MRA
- NRHP reference No.: 84001686
- Added to NRHP: July 5, 1984

Roberts Chapel is a historic chapel in Nicholasville, Kentucky.

It was built in 1845 and added to the National Register of Historic Places in 1984. During the Civil War, the hospital's proximity to Camp Nelson prompted its use as a military hospital.
