= Brick House on Shun Pike =

- U.S. National Register of Historic Places
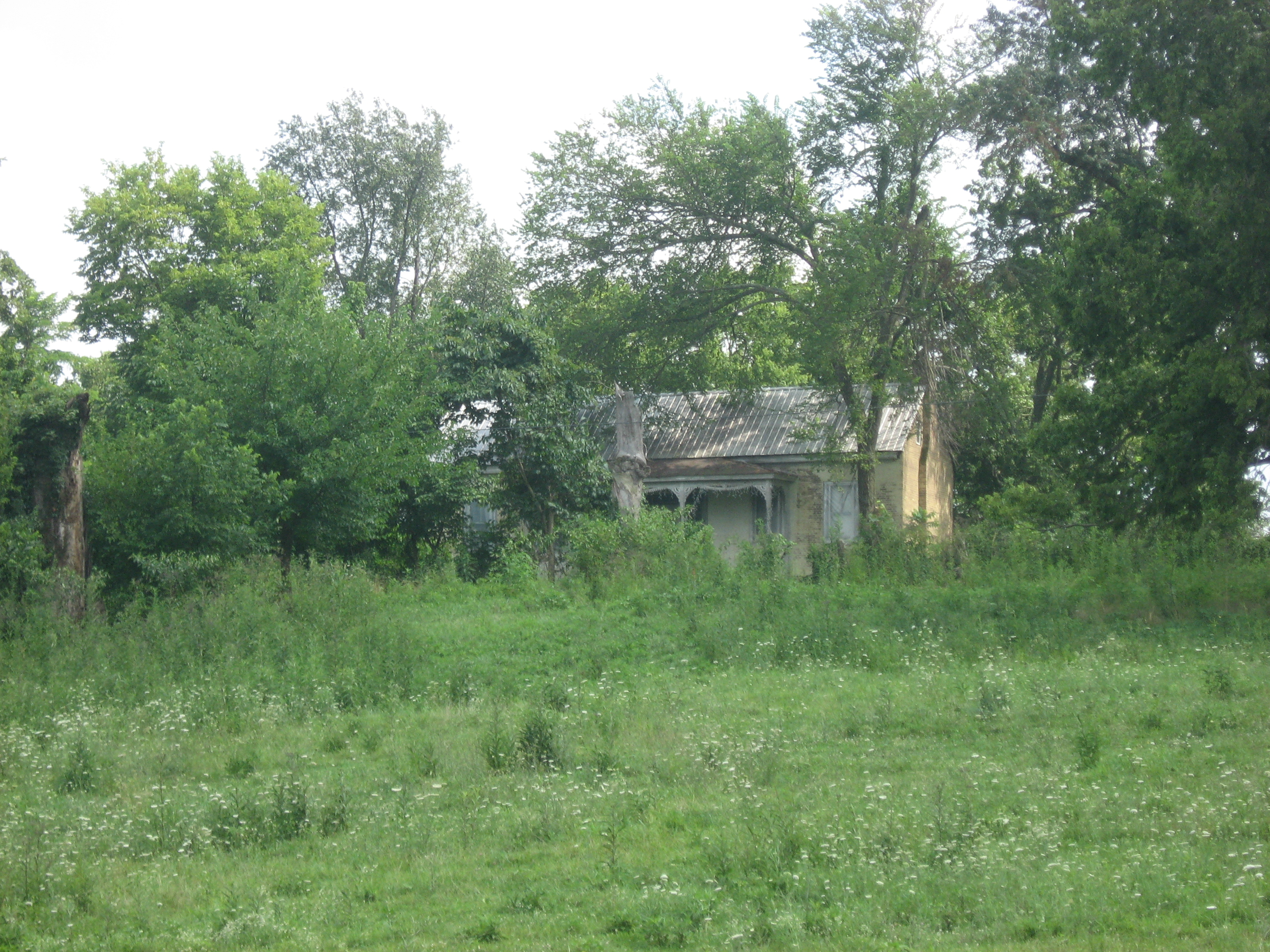

- Location within Kentucky Location within the United States
- Nearest city: Nicholasville, Kentucky
- Coordinates: 37°50′33″N 84°37′03″W
- Area: 40 acres (16 ha)
- Architectural style: Federal
- MPS: Jessamine County MRA
- NRHP reference No.: 84001601
- Added to NRHP: July 5, 1984

The Brick House on Shun Pike, near Nicholasville, Kentucky, was listed on the National Register of Historic Places in 1984. The listing included four contributing buildings on 40 acres (16 ha).

The house is a five-bay one-story brick central passage plan house, with an original brick ell and brick end chimneys. The brickwork is Flemish bond. It has high quality Federal-style interior woodwork.

It is located off what is now Kentucky Route 1268.
