= Camp Nelson National Cemetery =

Historic cemetery in Jessamine County, Kentucky

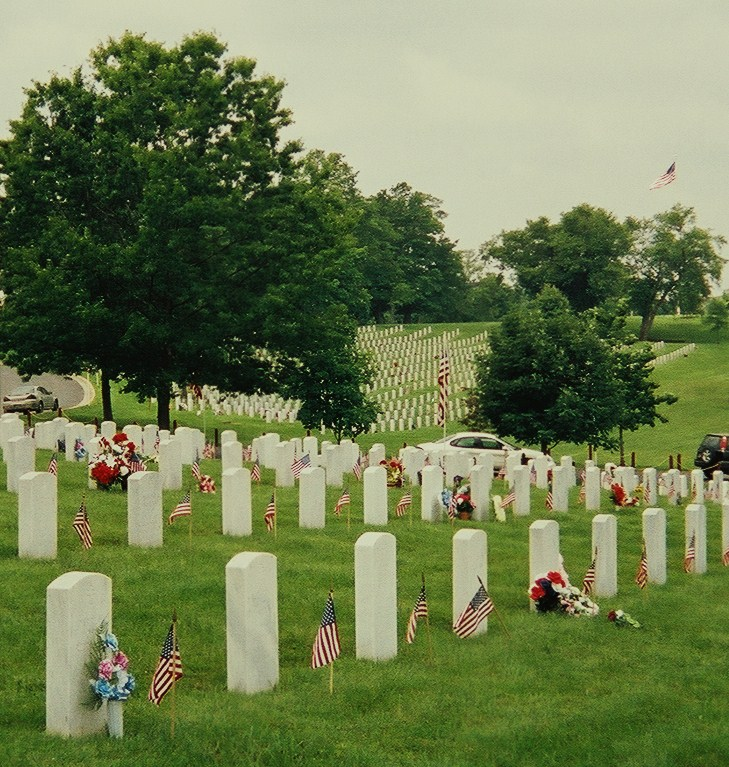
- Camp Nelson National Cemetery on Memorial Day, 2003.
- Interactive map of Camp Nelson National Cemetery

Details
- Established: 1866
- Location: 6890 Danville Road, Nicholasville, Kentucky
- Country: United States
- Coordinates: 37°47′14″N 84°36′09″W
- Type: Veterans
- Owned by: Department of Veterans Affairs
- Size: 30.2 acres (12.2 ha)
- No. of graves: 12,000+
- Camp Nelson National Cemetery
- U.S. National Register of Historic Places
- Architect: Montgomery C. Meigs
- Architectural style: Second Empire
- MPS: Civil War Era National Cemeteries MPS
- NRHP reference No.: 98001134
- Added to NRHP: September 3, 1998

Camp Nelson National Cemetery is a United States National Cemetery located in southern Jessamine County, Kentucky. It was originally a graveyard associated with the U.S. Army's Camp Nelson, which was active during the U.S. Civil War and its aftermath. The camp was named for Major General William "Bull" Nelson, commander of the Civil War Army of Kentucky, who was murdered by a fellow officer in 1862.

Administered by the United States Department of Veterans Affairs, the cemetery encompasses 30.2 acres (12.2 ha), has a capacity for 15,000 graves, and currently contains over 12,000 interments, nearly all of which were, at death, either U.S. Armed Forces personnel on active duty, veterans of the Armed Forces, or their dependent family members. There are 2,452 burials that date to the U.S. Civil War, and of those, 837 are known to be the graves of African-American soldiers. Their gravestone are marked with the letters "USCT" over their names; the designation stands for "United States Colored Troops".

== History ==
The cemetery was created in 1863 as a place to bury Union soldiers who died while serving in and around Camp Nelson during the Civil War. The first cemetery was located near the camp hospital, and 379 people were buried there between June 1863 and July 1865. A plot of land for the second cemetery, designated "Graveyard No. 2", was selected, and is now at the core of the present national cemetery. There were 1,183 soldiers and affiliated civilian employees buried there between the summer of 1865 and February 1866.

After the end of the Civil War, there was a federally mandated program to recover the bodies of Union soldiers from scattered and expedient battlefield graves across the country, and have them re-interred at national cemeteries as a gesture of respect and in order to facilitate the maintenance of graves. As part of this program, the federal government appropriated 8 acres (3.2 ha) for use as a cemetery and the roadway leading from the cemetery to the old Danville Pike, and it was designated a National Cemetery in 1866. In 1867 and 1868 a stone wall was built to enclose the cemetery. During June and July 1868, the remains of 2,023 Union soldiers were recovered from battlefield graves in Frankfort, Richmond, Perryville, London, and Covington; then brought to Camp Nelson and re-interred with honor.

=== Confederate graves ===
During the same time as the reburial program for the remains of Union soldiers, the remains of Confederate soldiers buried at Camp Nelson were exhumed, and re-buried in a designated section of the public cemetery in nearby Nicholasville, or in private cemeteries elsewhere. During the 1990s, genealogical evidence was presented to the cemetery director that the remains of two Confederate soldiers recovered from a Covington battlefield were mistakenly assumed to be Union soldiers during the post-war recovery program, and were buried at Camp Nelson. As exhumation and re-burial of the 130-year-old graves was considered impractical, their headstones were simply replaced by VA-approved Confederate gravestones, which have peon (pointed) tops and are marked by a Confederate emblem. These are the only two (alleged) Confederate graves at Camp Nelson National Cemetery.

=== From Reconstruction to the present ===
The area of Camp Nelson National Cemetery has expanded several times since its inception. In 1874 an additional adjoining acre was purchased. In 1875, a house was built near the stone wall as a residence for the superintendent of the cemetery. The two-storey brick house with open entry porch was designed by Quartermaster General Montgomery C. Meigs in the Second Empire architectural style.

Camp Nelson National Cemetery interred the remains of armed forces personnel and veterans who served in conflicts from the late 19th century until it closed to new burials in 1964. In 1975, the donation of 10 acres (4.0 ha) just outside the cemetery's stone wall allowed it to begin accepting new burials again. The purchase of additional land since then has enabled the cemetery to accommodate newly deceased World War II veterans and the recent influx of fatalities from the wars in Afghanistan and Iraq.

During the late 1980s, cemetery directors chose to commute to the cemetery from private residences rather than live on site. In 1995 the resident superintendent's house was renovated for use as the cemetery's main office and visitor center. In 1995, the Daughters of the Union erected a granite monument dedicated to the memory of Union soldiers who fought in the Civil War. In 1997, a new flagpole with surrounding assembly area was erected on a knoll within view of the road.

A committal shelter was built for the observance of funeral services. The committal shelter, or funeral shelter, is a roofed pavilion, open on three sides, and was intended to make graveside services unnecessary, as elderly mourners may have difficulty walking over uneven ground. The shelter can mitigate the inconvenience of inclement weather. Within the shelter is a bier for the casket, and space to accommodate twenty chairs for family members. In 1998, Camp Nelson National Cemetery was placed on the National Register of Historic Places (Reference #98001134).

In 2010, an additional 21 acres (8.5 ha) of land was purchased from the Camp Nelson Civil War Heritage Park, located next to the cemetery and owned by Jessamine County. The plot of land is located to the rear of the current cemetery. It is expected to double its capacity, bringing the total projected capacity to 30,000 graves. The purchase was made possible with a grant from the Department of Veterans Affairs' National Cemetery Administration and the co-operation of various local organizations.

== Annual events ==
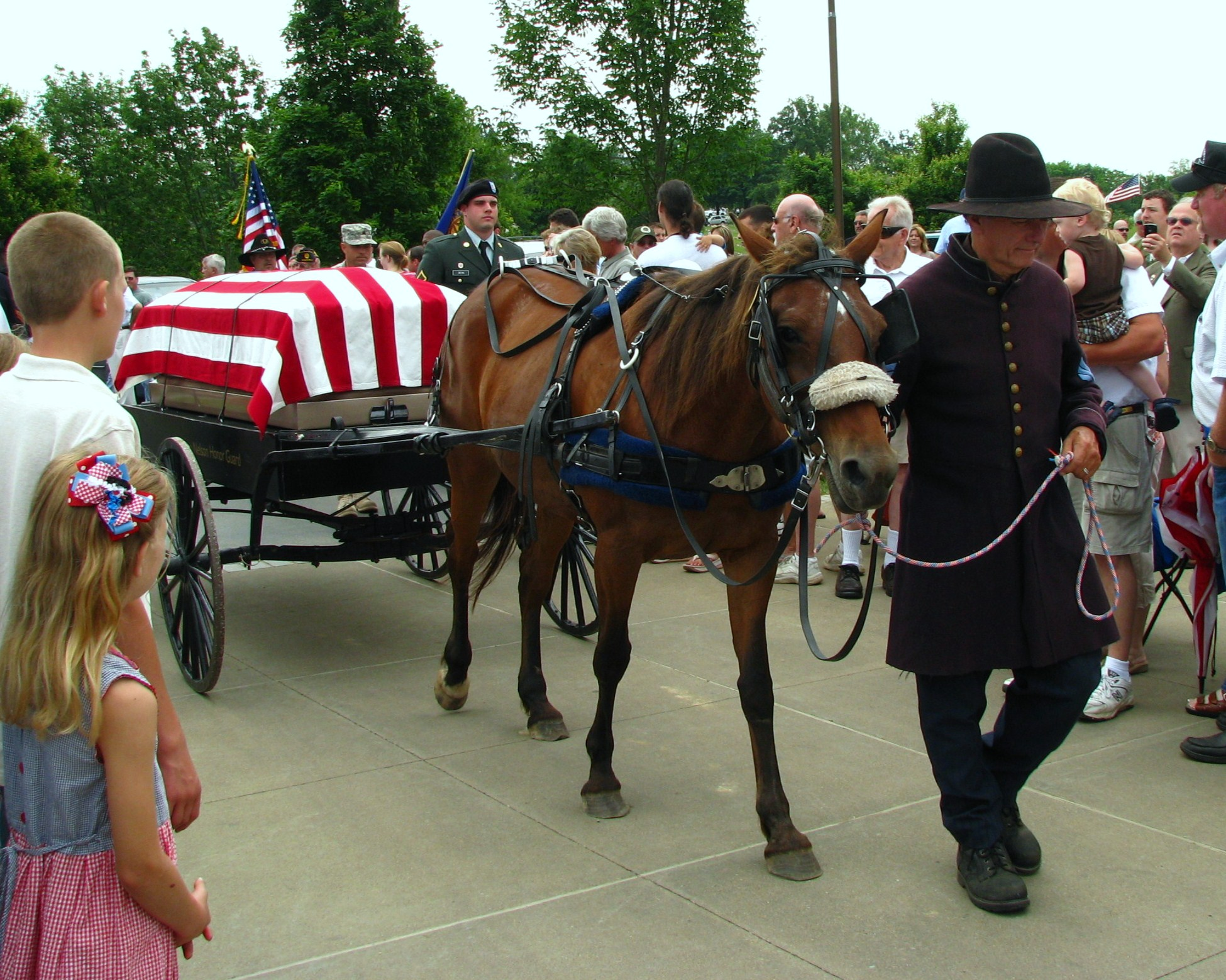
Memorial Day ceremony at Camp Nelson National Cemetery (May 2010)

Ceremonies are held annually on Memorial Day and on Veterans Day at Camp Nelson National Cemetery. In the past these were held in the walled-off old section, but since 1997, they have been held at the assembly area at the flagpole near the front gates.

At the Memorial Day ceremony, a keynote speaker is typically part of the program, as is a local high school band, a bugler who plays Taps, and a cannon salute. Representatives of reenactment units in Civil War-period uniforms are usually present to act as an honor guard. Represented units have included members from the re-enacted 54th Massachusetts Infantry, the all-black regiment that earned fame in the Civil War and fresh recognition from its depiction in the 1989 film Glory. In the past, the cannon salute was fired by representatives from a U.S. Army Reserve or Kentucky National Guard artillery unit. In recent years, the salute has been fired from a replica 19th-century cannon, fired by Civil War re-enactors. The ceremony has been augmented by a procession of a horse-drawn limber-and-caisson bearing an empty, flag-draped coffin, symbolic of the many military personnel who have died in the service of the country. This is followed by a soldier leading a riderless horse, an homage to their loss. In 2010, over 1,000 people attended the Memorial Day ceremony.

== Eligibility ==
Any veteran of the U.S. Armed Forces who was discharged from the military under conditions other than "dishonorable" is eligible to be buried at Camp Nelson. A veteran's spouse and dependent children are likewise eligible to be buried. The grave plot, headstone, perpetual maintenance of the grave, and labor involved with burial are provided at no cost to the veteran or the family. Starting in the 1990s, inexpensive plastic burial vaults have been used to enclose the casket within the grave, and are provided at no additional cost to the family. These vaults protect the casket from being crushed, and are effective at preventing collapse of the surface of the grave due to soil compaction.

At the funeral service of a veteran, an American flag will be draped over the casket. At the end of the service, it is ceremonially folded, and presented to the veteran's next-of-kin. "Taps" will be played at the veteran's funeral service at the request of the family.

== Staff ==
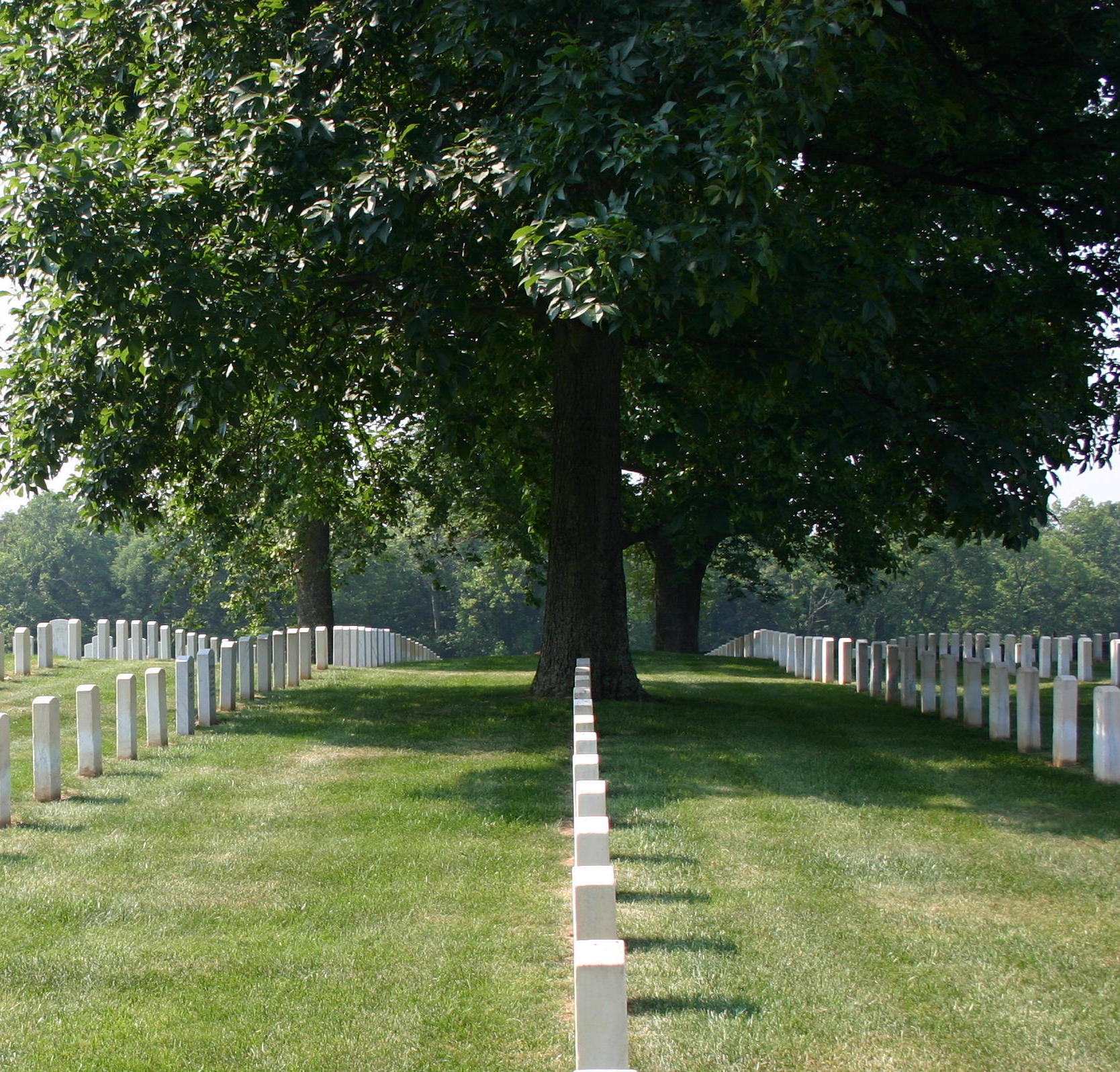
Tree in the old section at Camp Nelson National Cemetery, Kentucky.

Camp Nelson National Cemetery is overseen by one cemetery director. The director and one administrative assistant work in the office, communicating with families and funeral homes to schedule funeral services and burials, coordinate with various agencies for the annual ceremonies, maintain records, and to answer questions or address concerns made by the general public. The staff includes six full-time cemetery caretakers, though the Department of Veterans Affairs (VA) hires temporary workers almost every summer to augment the staff by about fifty percent. These caretakers prepare graves with a backhoe or hand held tools (pick and shovel), take custody of and transport a casket to its grave, lower the casket into the grave, seal it within a burial vault, and fill in the grave. Caretakers also receive delivered headstones, set and align them at the head of the appropriate graves, and maintain the grounds; duties include cutting the grass, pruning trees, clearing the roads of leaves in the autumn and snow in the winter, preparing the funeral shelter for services, disposing of litter, and interacting with the public to answer questions or find graves.

== Access ==
Camp Nelson National Cemetery is best accessed by motor vehicle. It is located about 15 miles (24 km) south of Lexington, Kentucky. The nearest airport is Blue Grass Airport in Lexington. From there, one can take Man o' War Boulevard east for about five miles to Nicholasville Road. After turning south toward Nicholasville (U.S. Route 27), follow that road for about 15 miles (24 km), and the cemetery will be on the left side, just before the bridge over the Kentucky River.

Camp Nelson National Cemetery is open to visitors everyday from dawn until dusk. The office and visitors' center is open Monday through Friday, from 8:00am to 4:00pm, except on federal holidays.

== Notable interments ==
- William Fowler (1815–1862), first non-white Wisconsin legislator; sergeant in Company I, 21st Wisconsin Infantry Regiment, died of wounds suffered at Battle of Perryville.
- William M. Harris (1850–1878), Medal of Honor recipient; Private, Company D, 7th U.S. Cavalry, for action during the Battle of the Little Big Horn, Montana, during the Great Sioux War.

== See also ==
- National Register of Historic Places listings in Jessamine County, Kentucky
- List of cemeteries in Kentucky
