= Kentucky Route 29 =

State highway in Kentucky, United States

Kentucky Route 29

Route information
- Maintained by KYTC
- Length: 11.324 mi (18.224 km)

Major junctions
- South end: Lock Seven Road in High Bridge
- US 68 near Nicholasville; US 27 in Nicholasville
- North end: US 27 Bus. / KY 39 in Nicholasville

Location
- Country: United States
- State: Kentucky
- Counties: Jessamine

Highway system
- Kentucky State Highway System; Interstate; US; State; Parkways
← KY 28	→ KY 30

Kentucky Route 29 (KY 29) is an 11.324-mile-long (18.224 km) state highway located entirely within Jessamine County in the U.S. state of Kentucky. The highway, maintained by the Kentucky Transportation Cabinet, runs north from High Bridge, Kentucky through Wilmore before ending at Nicholasville. Within Wilmore, KY 29 intersects Kentucky Route 1268 and junctions with Kentucky Route 3433. The highway acts as the border between Asbury University and Asbury Theological Seminary. Just north of Wilmore, KY 29 merges with U.S. Route 68 for 0.590 miles (0.950 km) before leaving US 68 and turning east heading towards Nicholasville. KY 29 terminates at Kentucky Route 39 and U.S. Route 27 Business in downtown Nicholasville.

== Route description ==
KY 29 begins at an intersection with Lock Seven Road near the Kentucky River in High Bridge, Jessamine County, heading north on two-lane undivided High Bridge Road. The road heads through woodland with some homes and turns to the east, passing under a Norfolk Southern railroad line. The route continues through farmland with some woods and residences and curves to the northeast. KY 29 turns to the north and comes to a bridge over the railroad tracks. The road heads northeast through more rural areas before it enters Wilmore and becomes South Lexington Avenue. KY 29 passes homes before it runs past businesses and comes to an intersection with KY 1268. The road becomes North Lexington Avenue and runs between Asbury University to the west and Asbury Theological Seminary to the east. The route intersects the western terminus of KY 3433 and continues through residential areas. KY 29 leaves Wilmore and becomes Lexington Road, passing through farmland with some residential development. The route comes to an intersection with US 68 and forms a concurrency with that route on Harrodsburg Road.

The road heads northeast and widens into a four-lane divided highway. KY 29 splits from US 68 by heading southeast on two-lane undivided Wilmore Road and continues through agricultural areas with some residential development. The road curves to the east and intersects the eastern terminus of KY 3433. The route heads into Nicholasville and widens to a divided highway as it comes to an interchange with US 27. KY 29 becomes undivided again and passes through residential and commercial areas, coming to another bridge over the Norfolk Southern line. The road becomes West Maple Street and runs past more homes before intersecting the southern terminus of KY 2332 and heading into the downtown area. KY 29 comes to its eastern terminus at an intersection with US 27 Bus., where the road continues east as KY 39.

== Major intersections ==
The entire route is in Jessamine County.

Location	mi	km	Destinations	Notes
High Bridge	0.000	0.000	Lock Seven Road	
Wilmore	4.761	7.662	KY 1268 (Main Street)	
Wilmore	5.020	8.079	KY 3433 east (East College Street)	
	7.044	11.336	US 68 west (Harrodsburg Road)	West end of US 68 overlap
	7.689	12.374	US 68 east (Harrodsburg Road)	East end of US 68 overlap
	8.974	14.442	KY 3433 west (Jessamine Station Road)	
Nicholasville	10.070	16.206	US 27	Interchange
Nicholasville	11.142	17.931	KY 2332 north (North 3rd Street)	
Nicholasville	11.324	18.224	US 27 Bus. (Main Street) / KY 39 south (East Maple Street)	
1.000 mi = 1.609 km; 1.000 km = 0.621 mi
