= Lexington and Main Historic District =

Historic district in Kentucky, United States

- U.S. National Register of Historic Places
- U.S. Historic district
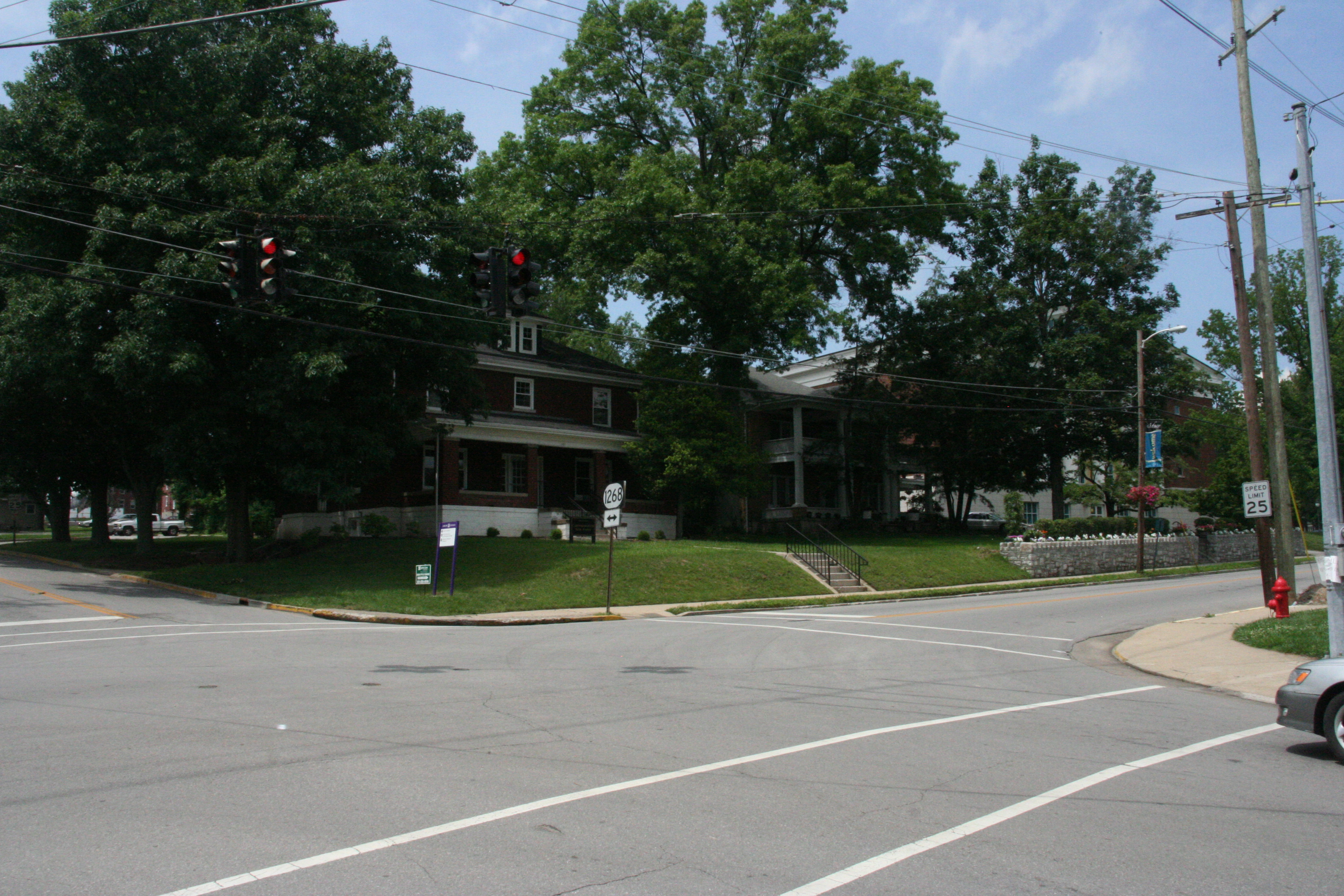

- Location within Kentucky Location within the United States
- Nearest city: Wilmore, Kentucky
- Coordinates: 37°51′41″N 84°39′43″W
- Area: 3 acres (1.2 ha)
- Architectural style: Late 19th and Early 20th Century American Movements, Four Square
- NRHP reference No.: 94000842
- Added to NRHP: August 5, 1994

The Lexington and Main Historic District in Wilmore, Kentucky is a 3 acres (1.2 ha) historic district which was listed on the National Register of Historic Places in 1994.

It includes 100, 101, 102, 103, and 105 N. Lexington Ave. and 101 E. Main St. in Wilmore.

It includes five or six contributing buildings.
