= Providence Church =

Historic church in Kentucky, United States

- U.S. National Register of Historic Places
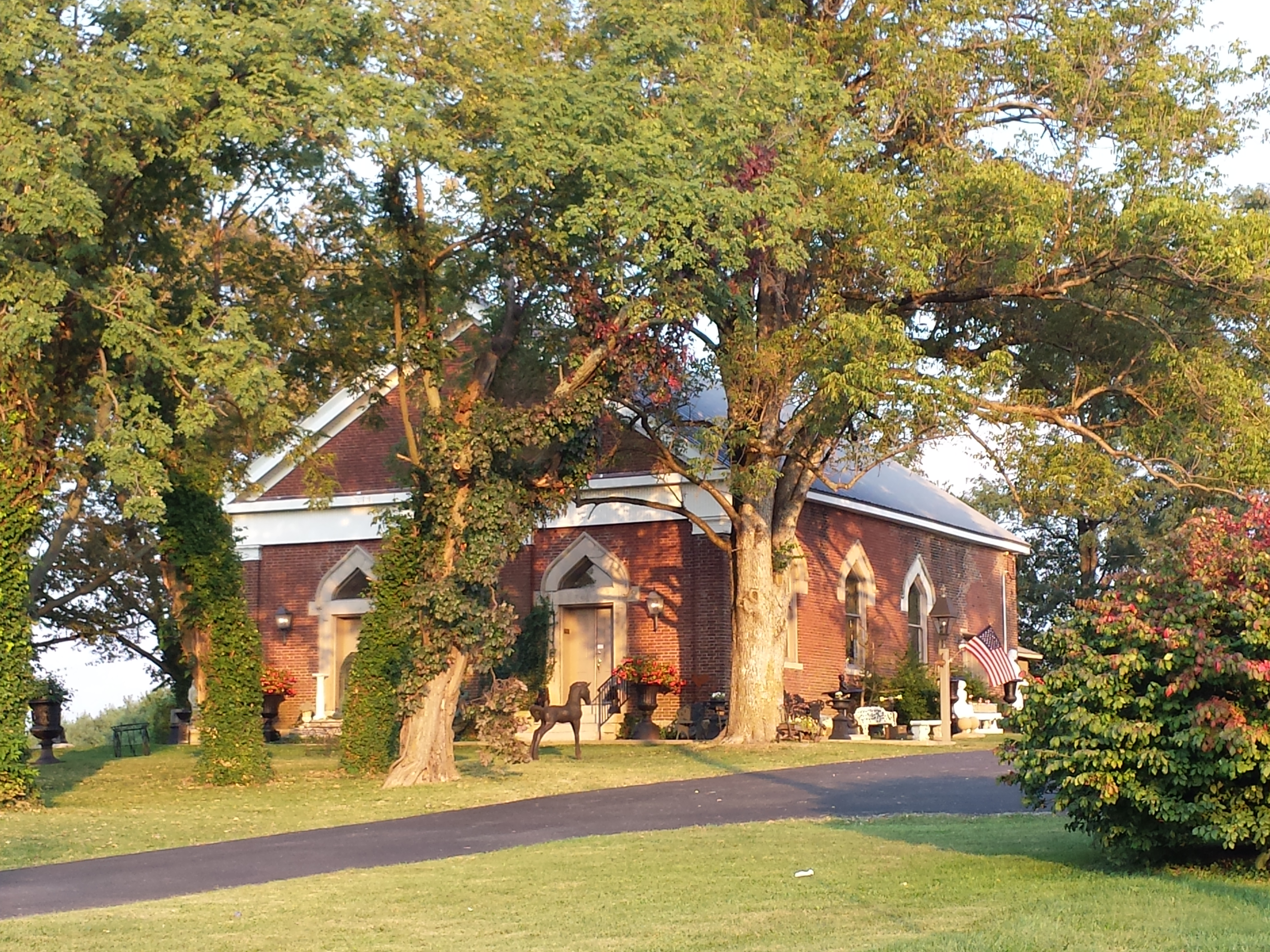

- Location within Kentucky Location within the United States
- Nearest city: Nicholasville, Kentucky
- Coordinates: 37°57′28″N 84°32′15″W
- Area: 2 acres (0.81 ha)
- Built: 1849
- Architectural style: Greek Revival, Gothic Revival
- MPS: Jessamine County MRA
- NRHP reference No.: 84001682
- Added to NRHP: July 5, 1984

The Providence Church in Nicholasville, Kentucky, later home of Kindred's Antiques, is a historic church building. It was built in 1849 and added to the National Register in 1984.

It is a brick church with brick pilasters and with doors framed in elaborately carved stone. It has Greek Revival and Gothic Revival elements.
