= Little Hickman, Kentucky =

Unincorporated community in Kentucky, United States

- Unincorporated community
- Location within Kentucky Location within the United States
- Coordinates: 37°46′25″N 84°34′13″W
- Country: United States
- State: Kentucky
- County: Jessamine
- Elevation: 735 ft (224 m)
- Time zone: UTC-6 (Central (CST))
  - Summer (DST): UTC-5 (CST)
- GNIS feature ID: 508478

Little Hickman is an unincorporated community in Jessamine County, Kentucky, United States. Its post office has been closed.
