= Logana, Kentucky =

Unincorporated community in Kentucky, United States

- Unincorporated community
- Location within Kentucky Location within the United States
- Coordinates: 37°51′53″N 84°29′13″W
- Country: United States
- State: Kentucky
- County: Jessamine
- Elevation: 879 ft (268 m)
- Time zone: UTC-6 (Central (CST))
  - Summer (DST): UTC-5 (CST)
- GNIS feature ID: 496988

Logana is an unincorporated community located in Jessamine County, Kentucky, United States. Its post office is no longer in service.
