= J. S. Bronaugh House =

- U.S. National Register of Historic Places
- Location: 103 N. 2nd St., Nicholasville, Kentucky
- Coordinates: 37°52′53″N 84°34′28″W
- Area: 0.6 acres (0.24 ha)
- Architectural style: Italianate
- MPS: Jessamine County MRA
- NRHP reference No.: 84001603
- Added to NRHP: July 5, 1984

The J. S. Bronaugh House, at 103 N. 2nd St. in Nicholasville, Kentucky, was listed on the National Register of Historic Places in 1984.

It was an Italianate-style two-story brick house with an L-shaped plan and an octagonal projecting bay at its ell gable end.

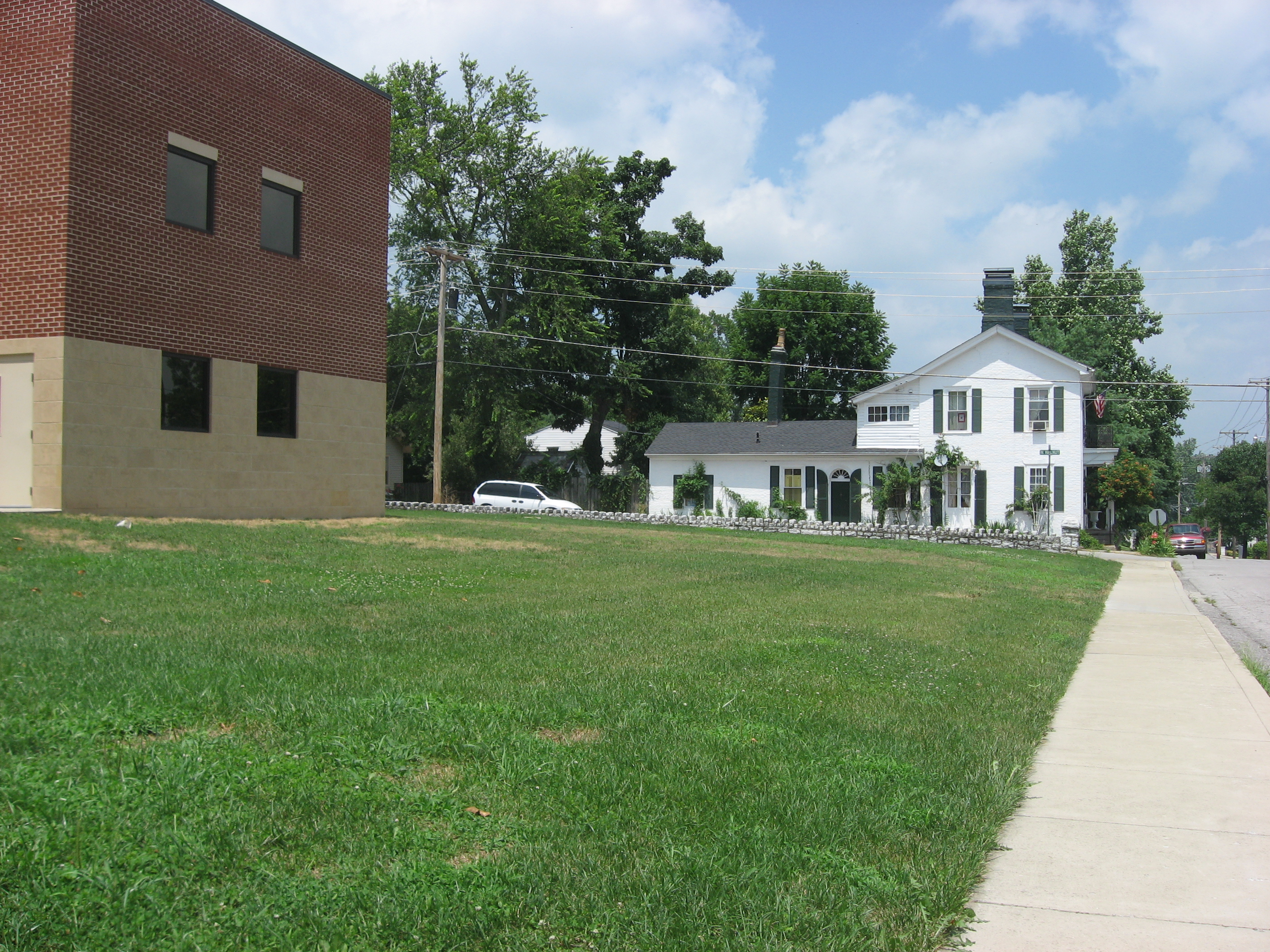
Site of the house

The house is no longer standing.
