= Keene, Kentucky =

- City
- Location within Kentucky Location within the United States
- Coordinates: 37°56′35″N 84°38′28″W
- Country: United States
- State: Kentucky
- County: Jessamine
- Incorporated: 1844
- Named for: Keene, New Hampshire

Area
  - Total: 0.12 sq mi (0.32 km^{2})
  - Land: 0.12 sq mi (0.32 km^{2})
  - Water: 0 sq mi (0.00 km^{2})
- Elevation: 892 ft (272 m)

Population (2020)
  - Total: 99
  - Density: 805.6/sq mi (311.06/km^{2})
- Time zone: UTC-5 (Eastern (EST))
  - Summer (DST): UTC-4 (EDT)
- ZIP code: 40339
- FIPS code: 21-41716
- GNIS feature ID: 2797229

Keene is a home rule-class city located in Jessamine County, Kentucky, in the United States. As of the 2020 census, Keene had a population of 99. It is home to the Keene Springs Hotel.

== History ==
The community grew up around a stone mill erected in 1794 and was originally laid out as North Liberty in 1813. In 1830, however, the first postmaster, Ephraim Carter, named his new post office after Keene, New Hampshire, the hometown he shared with local store owner Harvey Huggins. The city was formally incorporated by the state assembly in 1844.

It was also known as "Hard Scrabble".

Keene was home to the Keene Industrial Institute, an industrial school for African Americans for a couple of years at the beginning of the 20th century.

== Geography ==
Keene is in northwestern Jessamine County along Keene Troy Pike, 11 miles (18 km) southwest of Lexington and 6 miles (10 km) northwest of Nicholasville, the Jessamine County seat. It sits on the north side of the valley of a tributary of Cave Spring Creek, flowing west to Clear Creek, a tributary of the Kentucky River.

== Demographics ==
Historical population
Census	Pop.	Note	%±
2020	99		—
U.S. Decennial Census

== Climate ==
The climate in this area is characterized by hot, humid summers and generally mild to cool winters. According to the Köppen Climate Classification system, Keene has a humid subtropical climate, abbreviated "Cfa" on climate maps.

== Notable people ==
- Jimmy Blythe, composer, pianist
