= Wilmore, Kentucky =

- City
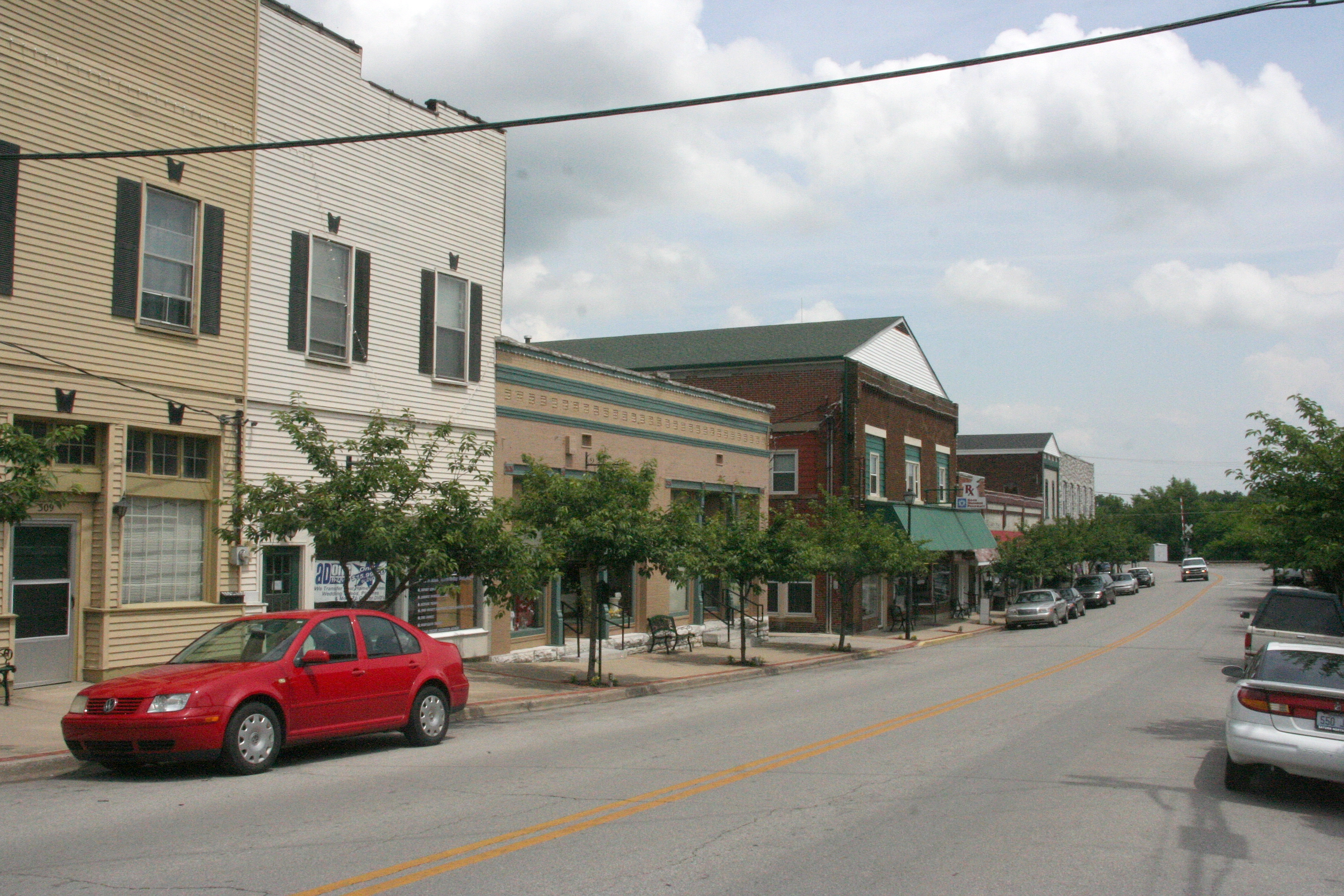
- The East Main Street Historic District is listed on the National Register of Historic Places
- Motto: "...Small town charm"
- Location of Wilmore in Jessamine County, Kentucky.
- Coordinates: 37°51′50″N 84°39′54″W
- Country: United States
- State: Kentucky
- County: Jessamine

Area
  - Total: 4.09 sq mi (10.60 km^{2})
  - Land: 4.06 sq mi (10.51 km^{2})
  - Water: 0.035 sq mi (0.09 km^{2})
- Elevation: 929 ft (283 m)

Population (2020)
  - Total: 5,999
  - Estimate (2024): 6,268
  - Density: 1,478.4/sq mi (570.81/km^{2})
- Time zone: UTC-5 (Eastern (EST))
  - Summer (DST): UTC-4 (EDT)
- ZIP code: 40390
- Area code: 859
- FIPS code: 21-83550
- GNIS feature ID: 2405755
- Website: http://www.wilmore.org/

Wilmore is a home rule-class city in Jessamine County, Kentucky, United States. The population was 5,999 at the 2020 census. It is part of the Lexington–Fayette Metropolitan Statistical Area. According to the United States Census Bureau, the city has a total area of 2.6 square miles (6.7 km^{2}), all of it land.

== History ==
A post office called "Wilmore" was established in 1877. It was named for John R. Wilmore, a local landowner and former slave owner.

In 1882, the Southern Railway established a line through the county and located a flag stop at Wilmore which was briefly called "Scott's Station". It was named for John D. Scott, the owner of the site. The station's name was soon changed to Wilmore.

By the 1890s, Wilmore was a prosperous settlement with a population of about 600. Wilmore was an important shipping point for cattle, hogs, grain and other produce, and the settlement had a blacksmith, carriage repair shops, two drug stores, three doctors, three large stores, a hardware store, two butcher shops, a livery stable, a school, several churches, a glass mill, and a grist mill. Asbury University (formerly Asbury College) was founded in 1890.

Wilmore was incorporated in 1918.

From 1970 to 2012, Wilmore was the original location of the Ichthus Music Festival, a gathering of Christian musical artists and speakers; upon its revival in 2021 it returned to Wilmore. The city is home to the Highbridge Film Festival, a showcase for locally produced films.

Several locations in Wilmore are listed on the National Register of Historic Places, including the Asbury University Administration Building (renamed the Hager Administration Building), the East Main Street Historic District, the Kenyon Avenue Historic District, the Lexington and Main Historic District, the Morrison-Kenyon Library, and the North Lexington Avenue Historic District.

== Demographics ==
Historical population
| Census | Pop. | Note | %± |
|---|---|---|---|
| 1920 | 1,157 | | — |
| 1930 | 1,329 | | 14.9% |
| 1940 | 1,228 | | −7.6% |
| 1950 | 2,337 | | 90.3% |
| 1960 | 2,773 | | 18.7% |
| 1970 | 3,466 | | 25.0% |
| 1980 | 3,787 | | 9.3% |
| 1990 | 4,215 | | 11.3% |
| 2000 | 5,905 | | 40.1% |
| 2010 | 3,686 | | −37.6% |
| 2020 | 5,999 | | 62.8% |
| 2024 (est.) | 6,268 | | 4.5% |
U.S. Decennial Census

=== 2020 census ===
As of the 2020 census, Wilmore had a population of 5,999. The median age was 29.3 years. 21.1% of residents were under the age of 18 and 16.3% of residents were 65 years of age or older. For every 100 females there were 96.0 males, and for every 100 females age 18 and over there were 91.2 males age 18 and over.

95.4% of residents lived in urban areas, while 4.6% lived in rural areas.

There were 1,844 households in Wilmore, of which 35.0% had children under the age of 18 living in them. Of all households, 57.7% were married-couple households, 12.9% were households with a male householder and no spouse or partner present, and 26.6% were households with a female householder and no spouse or partner present. About 24.8% of all households were made up of individuals and 11.3% had someone living alone who was 65 years of age or older.

There were 2,001 housing units, of which 7.8% were vacant. The homeowner vacancy rate was 2.2% and the rental vacancy rate was 6.6%.

Racial composition as of the 2020 census
| Race | Number | Percent |
|---|---|---|
| White | 5,228 | 87.1% |
| Black or African American | 187 | 3.1% |
| American Indian and Alaska Native | 24 | 0.4% |
| Asian | 189 | 3.2% |
| Native Hawaiian and Other Pacific Islander | 2 | 0.0% |
| Some other race | 98 | 1.6% |
| Two or more races | 271 | 4.5% |
| Hispanic or Latino (of any race) | 247 | 4.1% |

=== 2000 census ===
At the 2000 census there were 5,905 people, 1,638 households, and 1,215 families living in the city. The population density was 2,239.1 per square mile (864.5/km^{2}). There were 1,740 housing units at an average density of 659.8 per square mile (254.8/km^{2}). The racial makeup of the city was 94.53% White, 1.93% African American, 0.14% Native American, 2.08% Asian, 0.03% Pacific Islander, 0.32% from other races, and 0.97% from two or more races. Hispanic or Latino of any race were 1.30%.

Of the 1,638 households 39.3% had children under the age of 18 living with them, 64.8% were married couples living together, 7.3% had a female householder with no husband present, and 25.8% were non-families. 21.2% of households were one person and 7.4% were one person aged 65 or older. The average household size was 2.69 and the average family size was 3.14.

The age distribution was 22.2% under the age of 18, 26.6% from 18 to 24, 28.0% from 25 to 44, 12.1% from 45 to 64, and 11.2% 65 or older. The median age was 26 years. For every 100 females, there were 99.0 males. For every 100 females age 18 and over, there were 98.1 males.

The median household income was $31,500 and the median family income was $40,000. Males had a median income of $26,192 versus $25,362 for females. The per capita income for the city was $13,602. About 9.1% of families and 11.5% of the population were below the poverty line, including 9.9% of those under age 18 and 9.1% of those age 65 or over.

== Education ==
Asbury University (formerly Asbury College) and Asbury Theological Seminary are located in Wilmore.
