= Jessamine County, Kentucky =

County in Kentucky, United States

- County
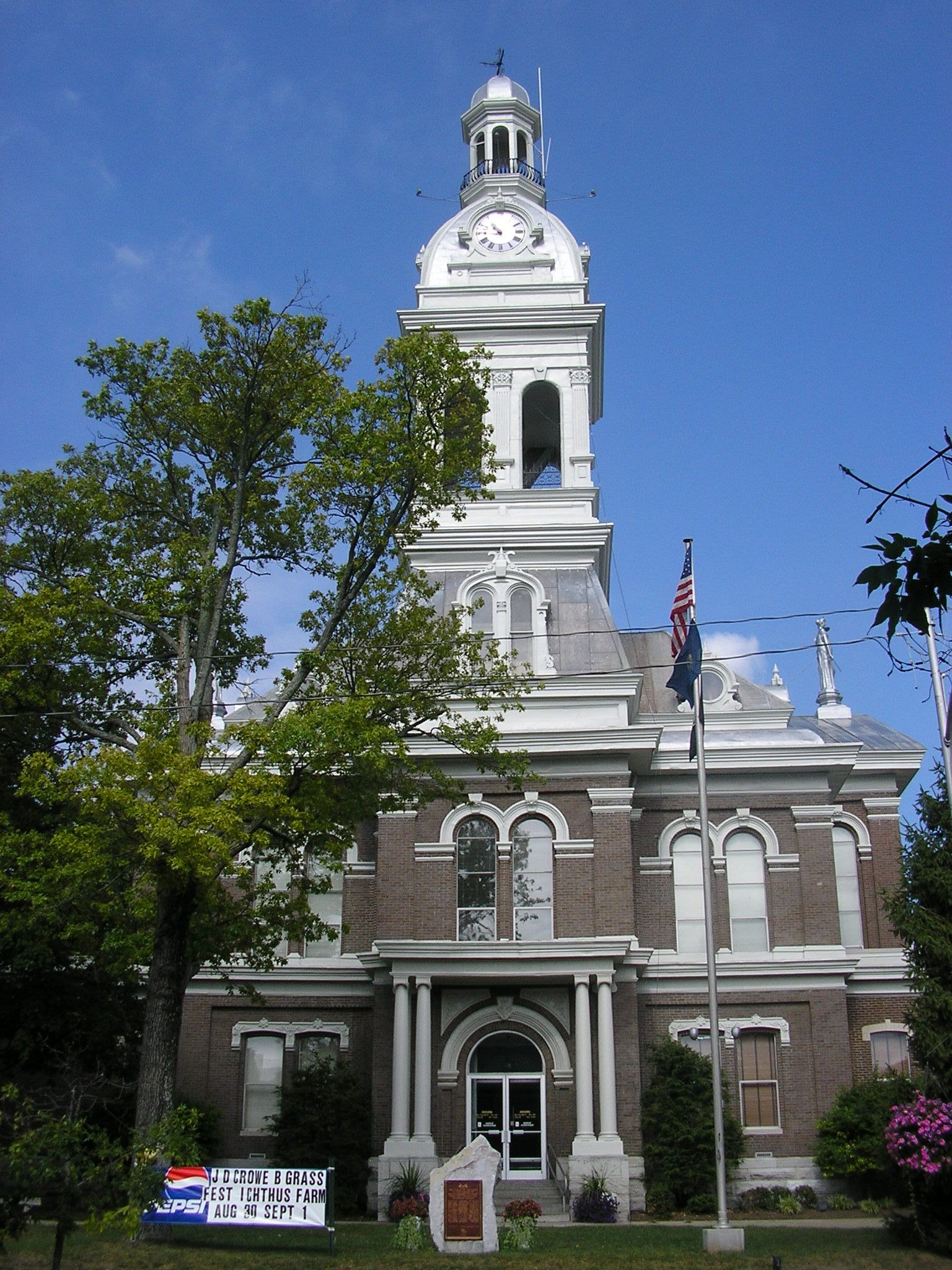
- Jessamine County courthouse in Nicholasville

- Location within the U.S. state of Kentucky
- Coordinates: 37°52′N 84°35′W
- Country: United States
- State: Kentucky
- Founded: December 19, 1798
- Named for: Jasmine flowers, Jessamine Creek
- Seat: Nicholasville
- Largest city: Nicholasville

Government
  - Judge/Executive: David West (R)

Area
  - Total: 175 sq mi (450 km^{2})
  - Land: 172 sq mi (450 km^{2})
  - Water: 2.4 sq mi (6.2 km^{2}) 1.4%

Population (2020)
  - Total: 52,991
  - Estimate (2025): 57,147 ▲
  - Density: 308/sq mi (119/km^{2})
- Time zone: UTC−5 (Eastern)
  - Summer (DST): UTC−4 (EDT)
- Congressional district: 6th
- Website: jessamineky.gov

Jessamine County (/ˈdʒɛsəmɪn/) is a county located in the U.S. state of Kentucky. As of the 2020 census, the population was 52,991. Its county seat is Nicholasville. The county was founded in December 1798. Jessamine County is part of the Lexington-Fayette, KY Metropolitan Statistical Area. It is within the Inner Blue Grass region, long a center of farming and thoroughbred horse breeding. The legislature established a commercial wine industry here in the late 18th century.

== History ==
Jessamine County was established in 1798 from land given by Fayette County. Jessamine was the 36th Kentucky county in order of formation. The county is claimed to be named for a Jessamine Douglass, the daughter of a pioneer settler, who was either killed by Native Americans or committed suicide after being unlucky in love, but that story is dismissed by modern scholars, who say the name is from Jessamine Creek and the jasmine flowers that grow next to it. Most of the early pioneers were from Virginia, who came through the mountains after the American Revolutionary War.

In the late 18th century, the Kentucky General Assembly passed a bill to establish a commercial vineyard and winery, based in Nicholasville and the first in the United States, known as First Vineyard. Wine making based on European grapes became widespread in the United States. After the Prohibition era, which lasted from 1920 to 1933, the county voted to prohibit alcohol sales. Voters in the city of Nicholasville allowed package alcohol sales. In 2020, voters voted to allow alcohol sales, reversing the county's dry policy. The Chrisman Mill Vineyards is authorized to operate and sell its product in the "dry" portion of the county.

== Geography ==
According to the United States Census Bureau, the county has a total area of 175 square miles (450 km^{2}), of which 172 square miles (450 km^{2}) is land and 2.4 square miles (6.2 km^{2}) (1.4%) is water. In 2000, nearly 129 square miles (330 km^{2}) of the county's total area was dedicated to agriculture.

The county's entire southern border is formed by the Kentucky River. Jessamine County's river bank extends roughly 42 miles (68 km) long due to meandering, and the river's scenic Palisades feature heavily along this border.

=== Adjacent counties ===
- Fayette County (northeast)
- Madison County (southeast)
- Garrard County (south)
- Mercer County (southwest)
- Woodford County (northwest)

== Demographics ==
Historical population
Census	Pop.	Note	%±
1800	5,461		—
1810	8,377		53.4%
1820	9,297		11.0%
1830	9,960		7.1%
1840	9,396		−5.7%
1850	10,249		9.1%
1860	9,465		−7.6%
1870	8,638		−8.7%
1880	10,864		25.8%
1890	11,248		3.5%
1900	11,925		6.0%
1910	12,613		5.8%
1920	12,205		−3.2%
1930	12,431		1.9%
1940	12,174		−2.1%
1950	12,458		2.3%
1960	13,625		9.4%
1970	17,430		27.9%
1980	26,146		50.0%
1990	30,508		16.7%
2000	39,041		28.0%
2010	48,586		24.4%
2020	52,991		9.1%
2025 (est.)	57,147	▲	7.8%
U.S. Decennial Census; 1790-1960 1900-1990; 1990-2000 2010-2020

=== 2020 census ===
As of the 2020 census, the county had a population of 52,991. The median age was 37.9 years. 25.1% of residents were under the age of 18 and 15.9% of residents were 65 years of age or older. For every 100 females there were 94.9 males, and for every 100 females age 18 and over there were 91.1 males age 18 and over.

The racial makeup of the county was 86.6% White, 4.3% Black or African American, 0.3% American Indian and Alaska Native, 1.2% Asian, 0.1% Native Hawaiian and Pacific Islander, 1.9% from some other race, and 5.7% from two or more races. Hispanic or Latino residents of any race comprised 4.5% of the population.

75.3% of residents lived in urban areas, while 24.7% lived in rural areas.

There were 19,438 households in the county, of which 34.8% had children under the age of 18 living with them and 25.4% had a female householder with no spouse or partner present. About 22.5% of all households were made up of individuals and 9.8% had someone living alone who was 65 years of age or older.

There were 20,626 housing units, of which 5.8% were vacant. Among occupied housing units, 66.2% were owner-occupied and 33.8% were renter-occupied. The homeowner vacancy rate was 1.2% and the rental vacancy rate was 5.1%.

=== 2000 census ===
As of the census of 2000, there were 39,041 people, 13,867 households, and 10,663 families residing in the county. The population density was 226 per square mile (87/km^{2}). There were 14,646 housing units at an average density of 85 per square mile (33/km^{2}). The racial makeup of the county was 94.44% White, 3.13% Black or African American, 0.20% Native American, 0.58% Asian, 0.03% Pacific Islander, 0.47% from other races, and 1.14% from two or more races. 1.31% of the population were Hispanic or Latino of any race.

There were 13,867 households, out of which 38.80% had children under the age of 18 living with them, 61.90% were married couples living together, 11.10% had a female householder with no husband present, and 23.10% were non-families. 18.50% of all households were made up of individuals, and 6.50% had someone living alone who was 65 years of age or older. The average household size was 2.69 and the average family size was 3.05.

The age distribution was 26.40% under the age of 18, 11.60% from 18 to 24, 31.10% from 25 to 44, 21.40% from 45 to 64, and 9.50% who were 65 years of age or older. The median age was 33 years. For every 100 females, there were 96.60 males. For every 100 females age 18 and over, there were 92.80 males.

The median income for a household in the county was $40,096, and the median income for a family was $46,152. Males had a median income of $32,340 versus $23,771 for females. The per capita income for the county was $18,842. About 8.40% of families and 10.50% of the population were below the poverty line, including 13.70% of those under age 18 and 9.90% of those age 65 or over.

== Transportation ==
The Lexington Area MPO is responsible for transportation planning for Fayette and Jessamine counties. This includes activities such as carpool matching, administering a commuter vanpool program, air quality forecasting, bicycle and pedestrian planning, congestion management, and developing transportation plans and documents.

== Communities ==
=== Cities ===
- Nicholasville (county seat)
- Wilmore

=== Census-designated place ===
- High Bridge

=== Other communities ===
- Brannon Woods
- Keene

== Education ==
Jessamine County Schools provides public education.

=== Elementary schools ===
- Brookside Elementary
- Jessamine Early Learning Village
- Nicholasville Elementary
- Red Oak Elementary
- Rosenwald-Dunbar Elementary
- Warner Elementary
- Wilmore Elementary

=== Middle schools ===
- East Jessamine Middle
- West Jessamine Middle

=== Middle/High School ===
- The Providence School

=== High schools ===
- East Jessamine High School
- West Jessamine High School
- Jessamine Career and Technology Center (JCTC)

=== Adult Education ===
- Jessamine County Adult Education

=== Post-secondary institutions ===
- Asbury University
- Asbury Theological Seminary

== Politics ==
United States presidential election results for Jessamine County, Kentucky
Year	Republican		Democratic		Third party(ies)	
Year	No.	%	No.	%	No.	%
1912	895	31.72%	1,506	53.37%	421	14.92%
1916	1,326	42.53%	1,727	55.39%	65	2.08%
1920	2,349	41.29%	3,206	56.35%	134	2.36%
1924	2,144	45.00%	2,470	51.85%	150	3.15%
1928	2,857	55.45%	2,295	44.55%	0	0.00%
1932	1,710	37.21%	2,873	62.52%	12	0.26%
1936	2,066	42.15%	2,813	57.38%	23	0.47%
1940	1,837	39.15%	2,815	60.00%	40	0.85%
1944	1,790	42.14%	2,426	57.11%	32	0.75%
1948	1,414	34.99%	2,301	56.94%	326	8.07%
1952	2,193	45.76%	2,578	53.80%	21	0.44%
1956	2,340	51.39%	2,072	45.51%	141	3.10%
1960	2,787	57.95%	2,022	42.05%	0	0.00%
1964	1,968	43.44%	2,485	54.86%	77	1.70%
1968	2,338	45.46%	1,334	25.94%	1,471	28.60%
1972	3,819	72.91%	1,269	24.23%	150	2.86%
1976	3,081	51.32%	2,795	46.55%	128	2.13%
1980	4,809	56.38%	3,310	38.80%	411	4.82%
1984	7,081	74.10%	2,379	24.90%	96	1.00%
1988	7,057	69.76%	2,955	29.21%	104	1.03%
1992	6,474	52.47%	3,764	30.50%	2,101	17.03%
1996	6,686	54.76%	4,428	36.27%	1,096	8.98%
2000	10,074	66.89%	4,633	30.76%	354	2.35%
2004	12,972	69.82%	5,476	29.47%	132	0.71%
2008	13,711	67.83%	6,236	30.85%	267	1.32%
2012	14,233	68.98%	6,001	29.08%	399	1.93%
2016	15,474	66.34%	6,144	26.34%	1,708	7.32%
2020	17,096	65.05%	8,567	32.60%	617	2.35%
2024	17,854	66.91%	8,303	31.11%	528	1.98%

=== Elected officials ===
Elected officials as of January 3, 2025
U.S. House	Andy Barr (R)	KY 6
Ky. Senate	Donald Douglas (R)	22
Ky. House	Matt Lockett (R)	39
Ky. House	Adam Moore (D)	45
Ky. House	Kim King (R)	55
Ky. House	Daniel Fister (R)	56

== See also ==
- Bethel Academy
- National Register of Historic Places listings in Jessamine County, Kentucky
