= Nicholasville, Kentucky =

- City
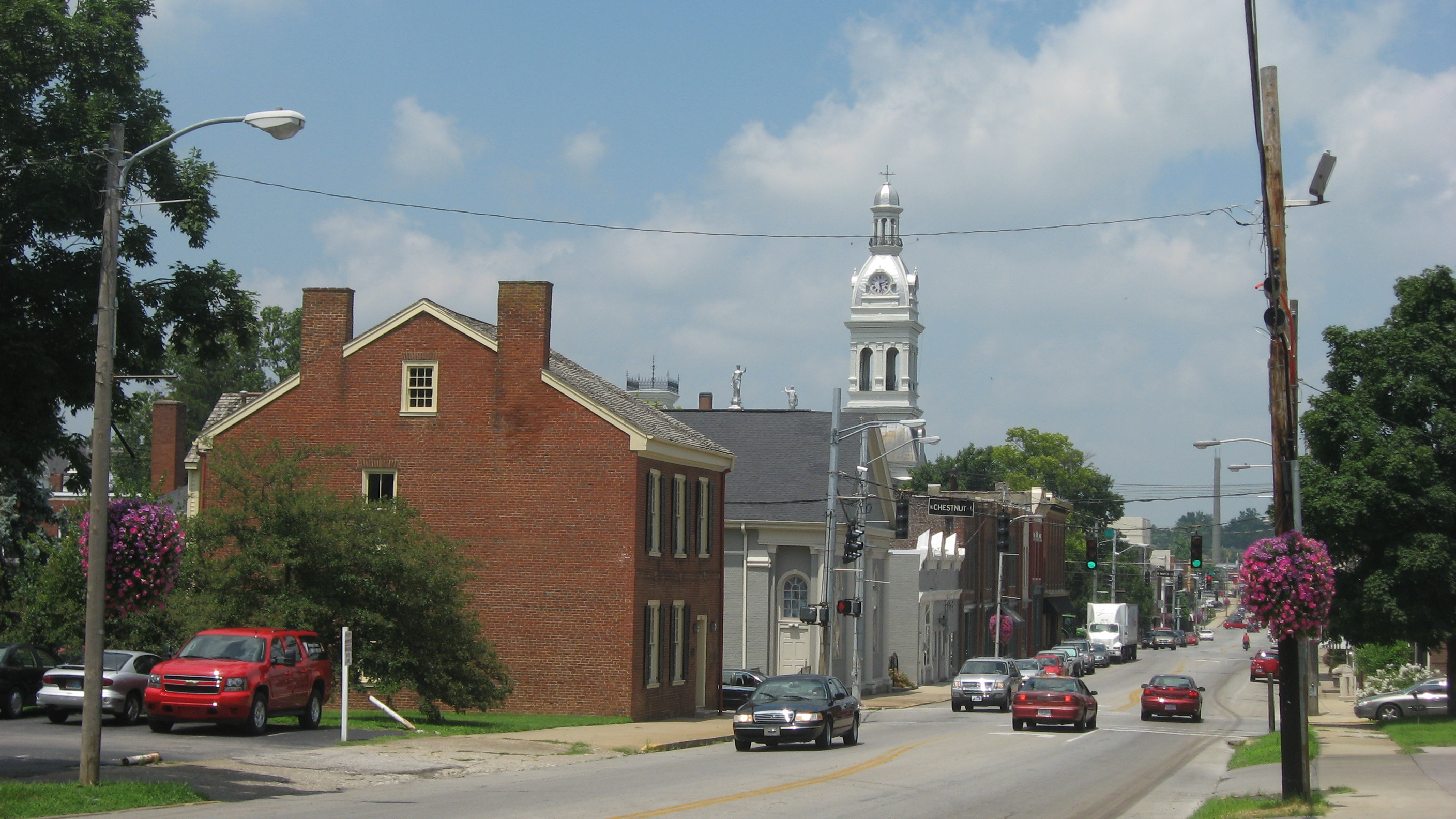
- Main Street in Nicholasville, Kentucky
- Interactive map of Nicholasville, Kentucky
- Location within Kentucky Location within the United States
- Coordinates: 37°53′26″N 84°34′02″W
- Country: United States
- State: Kentucky
- County: Jessamine
- Incorporated: February 13, 1837

Government
  - Type: City commission
  - Mayor: Alex Carter

Area
  - Total: 14.85 sq mi (38.45 km^{2})
  - Land: 14.78 sq mi (38.27 km^{2})
  - Water: 0.069 sq mi (0.18 km^{2})
- Elevation: 994 ft (303 m)

Population (2020)
  - Total: 31,093
  - Estimate (2022): 31,955
  - Density: 2,104.3/sq mi (812.47/km^{2})
- Time zone: UTC-5 (Eastern (EST))
  - Summer (DST): UTC-4 (EDT)
- ZIP Codes: 40340, 40356
- Area code: 859
- FIPS code: 21-56136
- GNIS feature ID: 2404379
- Website: nicholasville.org

Nicholasville is a city in and the county seat of Jessamine County, Kentucky, United States. The population was 31,490 at the 2020 census, making Nicholasville the tenth-most populous city in Kentucky. Nicholasville is a home rule-class city under Kentucky law.

Since the late 20th century, Nicholasville has undergone rapid growth; the population increased 440.23% between 1970 and 2020. Part of the Lexington–Fayette metropolitan area, the city serves as both a commuter town to Lexington and as an employment and shopping center in central Kentucky.

== History ==
Nicholasville was founded by European Americans in 1798, after the American Revolutionary War, and incorporated in 1837. The town was named in honor of Colonel George Nicholas, a father of the Kentucky Constitution in 1792. The Young House in Nicholasville is listed on the National Register of Historic Places.

The city has grown rapidly since the late 20th century and is working to accommodate new highways and transportation needs. Many residents commute to Lexington for work. Others are part of building Nicholasville as a center of retail services for the county.

== Geography ==
Downtown Nicholasville is approximately 6 miles (9.7 km) south of Fayette County. The city serves as a logistics and commuter hub between Lexington and Nicholasville's neighboring counties, especially Garrard County. According to the U.S. Census Bureau, the city has a total area of 13.08 square miles (33.9 km^{2}), of which 13.01 square miles (33.7 km^{2}) is land and 0.07 square miles (0.18 km^{2}), or 0.52%, is water. Some artificial ponds, including Lake Mingo (named after the Native American Mingo people), are present in the city. Town Fork, a partially channelized stream, runs south and passes underneath downtown, eventually draining into Jessamine Creek.

=== Climate ===
Nicholasville is in the northern periphery of the humid subtropical climate zone, with hot and humid summers, cool winters, and occasional mild periods, especially in autumn. The city and the surrounding Bluegrass region have four distinct seasons that include cool plateau breezes, moderate nights in the summer, and no prolonged periods of rain, snow, or other severe weather.

== Demographics ==
Historical population
Census	Pop.	Note	%±
1810	158		—
1830	408		—
1840	632		54.9%
1860	800		—
1870	1,089		36.1%
1880	2,303		111.5%
1890	2,157		−6.3%
1900	2,393		10.9%
1910	2,935		22.6%
1920	2,786		−5.1%
1930	3,128		12.3%
1940	3,192		2.0%
1950	3,406		6.7%
1960	4,275		25.5%
1970	5,829		36.4%
1980	10,400		78.4%
1990	13,603		30.8%
2000	19,680		44.7%
2010	28,015		42.4%
2020	31,093		11.0%
2025 (est.)	33,857		8.9%

=== 2020 census ===
As of the 2020 census, Nicholasville had a population of 31,093. The median age was 35.7 years. 27.2% of residents were under the age of 18 and 14.0% of residents were 65 years of age or older. For every 100 females there were 91.2 males, and for every 100 females age 18 and over there were 86.8 males age 18 and over.

99.2% of residents lived in urban areas, while 0.8% lived in rural areas.

There were 11,769 households in Nicholasville, of which 36.5% had children under the age of 18 living in them. Of all households, 45.9% were married-couple households, 15.0% were households with a male householder and no spouse or partner present, and 30.6% were households with a female householder and no spouse or partner present. About 25.0% of all households were made up of individuals and 10.3% had someone living alone who was 65 years of age or older.

There were 12,356 housing units, of which 4.8% were vacant. The homeowner vacancy rate was 1.2% and the rental vacancy rate was 4.9%.

Racial composition as of the 2020 census
Race	Number	Percent
White	26,180	84.2%
Black or African American	1,910	6.1%
American Indian and Alaska Native	69	0.2%
Asian	239	0.8%
Native Hawaiian and Other Pacific Islander	24	0.1%
Some other race	626	2.0%
Two or more races	2,045	6.6%
Hispanic or Latino (of any race)	1,572	5.1%

=== Income ===
According to Census Bureau data for 2011 from the American Community Survey's five-year estimates, the median income for a household in the city was $43,453, and the median income for a family was $52,419. Full-time male workers had a median income of $37,954 versus $33,330 for females. The per capita income for the city was $19,526. About 14.5% of families and 17.1% of the population were below the poverty line, including 22.7% of those under age 18 and 6.5% of those age 65 or over.

== Arts and culture ==
The city is home to the Kentucky Wine and Vine Fest. The annual festival showcases wines from commercial vineyards and amateur winemakers from across Kentucky and the surrounding region. In 2014, it was named as the "Official Wine Festival of Kentucky" by the Kentucky General Assembly. Nicholasville is near Camp Nelson National Monument and Camp Nelson National Cemetery.

== Government ==
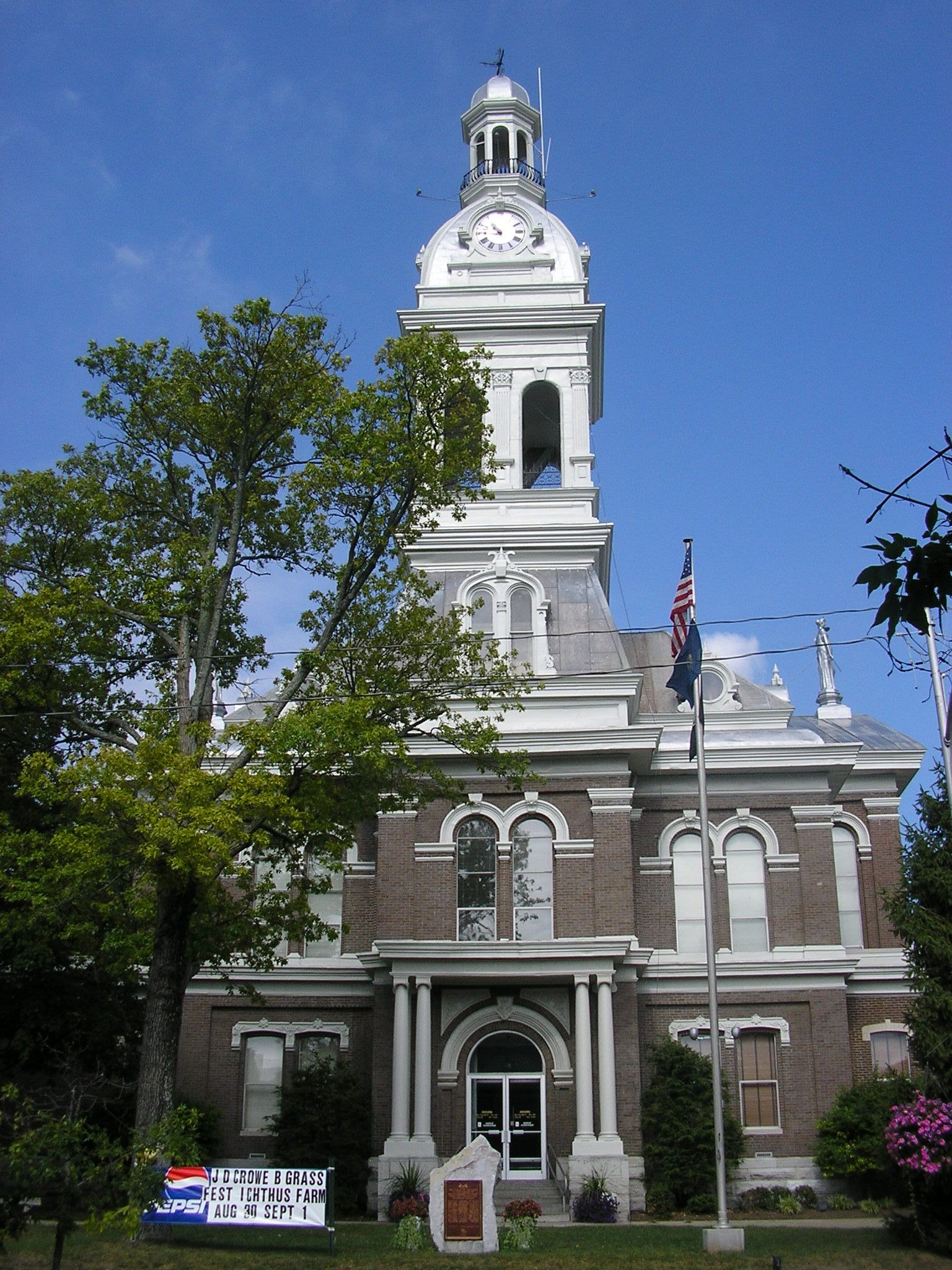
Jessamine County Courthouse

The Nicholasville government operates under a non-partisan city commission, which exercises both executive and legislative powers. The commission is composed of a mayor and four commissioners; all are elected at-large, requiring each candidate to gain the support of the majority of the electorate. In addition, the four commissioners are elected to manage particular city departments. They serve two-year terms; the mayor is elected to a four-year term. The commission wields all executive, legislative, and administrative powers.

In 2012, there was a proposal on the ballot to change the form of city government to that of a mayor–council government, in order to separate the legislative and executive functions, but the proposal was defeated.

Commissioners draft and pass laws and, by managing their respective departments, ensure the laws are carried out efficiently. The mayor administers oaths, signs documents on the city's behalf, and conducts commission meetings. As a member of the commission, the mayor has legislative powers equal to that of the commissioners. Commission meetings take place twice monthly.

== Education ==
Jessamine County Schools provides public education. Nicholasville Elementary School is located in the city. Other elementary schools in the city include: Brookside Elementary School, Red Oak Elementary School, Rosenwald-Dunbar Elementary School, and Hattie C. Warner Elementary School. The Warner school, located on Wilmore Road, is named for local teacher Hattie Catherine Warner (1886–1963) who taught for 46 years in Jessamine County. She graduated from Eastern Kentucky University in 1913 and is buried in the Maple Grove cemetery.

Students attend county schools for grades above elementary grades.

Nicholasville has a lending library, the Jessamine County Public Library.

== Transportation ==
- U.S. Route 27 is a major north–south artery. A four-lane arterial highway with a center-turning lane serves drivers from the Lexington city limits to the Business US 27 intersection north of the city center. US 27 diverts to the western edge of the city center on a four-lane, controlled-access bypass and continues south of the city toward the Kentucky River.
- Kentucky Route 29 is an east–west two-lane highway that stretches from the western fringes of the city west of the U.S. 27 bypass to Business U.S. 27 in downtown Nicholasville. It is known as Wilmore Road west of U.S. 27 and east of Maple Street.
- Kentucky Route 39 is a north–south highway that stretches from the farms south of the city before concluding at Business U.S. 27 at downtown. It is known as Maple Street, and as Sulphur Well Road and then Lancaster Road.
- Kentucky Route 169 is an east–west highway that cuts through the city center. It has intersections with U.S. 27 and Business U.S. 27. It is known as Keene Road northwest of the city center, then 3rd Street, Richmond Road and Union Mills Road on the east side.
- Kentucky Route 1980 is known as Ash Grove Road and travels into Fayette County to the east. It departs from U.S. 27 just south of the Lexington city limits.
- Kentucky Route 3375 traverses west of U.S. 27, north of the city center, and is known as Catnip Hill Road.

== Notable people ==
- Richard J. Corman, founder of R.J Corman Railroad Group
- Charles K. Duncan, U.S. Navy admiral
- Lee Thomas Miller, country songwriter
- John Michael Montgomery, musician
- Lena Madesin Phillips, lawyer
- Harry Dean Stanton, actor
- John C. Watts, U.S. Representative
- Bennett H. Young, Confederate officer involved in the St. Albans Raid
