= Asbury University =

Christian university in Wilmore, Kentucky, US

- Former names: Kentucky Holiness College (1890–1891); Asbury College (1891–2010)
- Motto: Eruditio et Religio (Latin)
- Motto in English: Learning and Religion
- Type: Private university
- Established: September 2, 1890; 135 years ago
- Religious affiliation: Christian
- Academic affiliations: Christian College Consortium; Council for Christian Colleges and Universities; Space-grant
- Endowment: $78.15 million (2024)
- President: Kevin J. Brown
- Provost: Sherry Powers
- Academic staff: 150
- Administrative staff: 400
- Students: 1,854
- Undergraduates: 1,789
- Postgraduates: 311
- Location: Wilmore, Kentucky, United States; 37.8636°N 84.6649°W
- Campus: Suburban
- Colors: Purple & white
- Sporting affiliations: NCAA DIII, NCCAA
- Mascot: Eagle
- Website: www.asbury.edu

Asbury University is a private Christian university in Wilmore, Kentucky, United States. Although it is not affiliated with a particular denomination, Asbury University is aligned with the Wesleyan-Holiness movement of Methodism. The school offers 50-plus majors across 17 departments. In the fall of 2016, Asbury University had a total enrollment of 1,854: 1,640 traditional undergraduate students and 214 graduate students. The campus of Asbury Theological Seminary, which became a separate institution in 1922, is located across the street from Asbury University.

== History ==
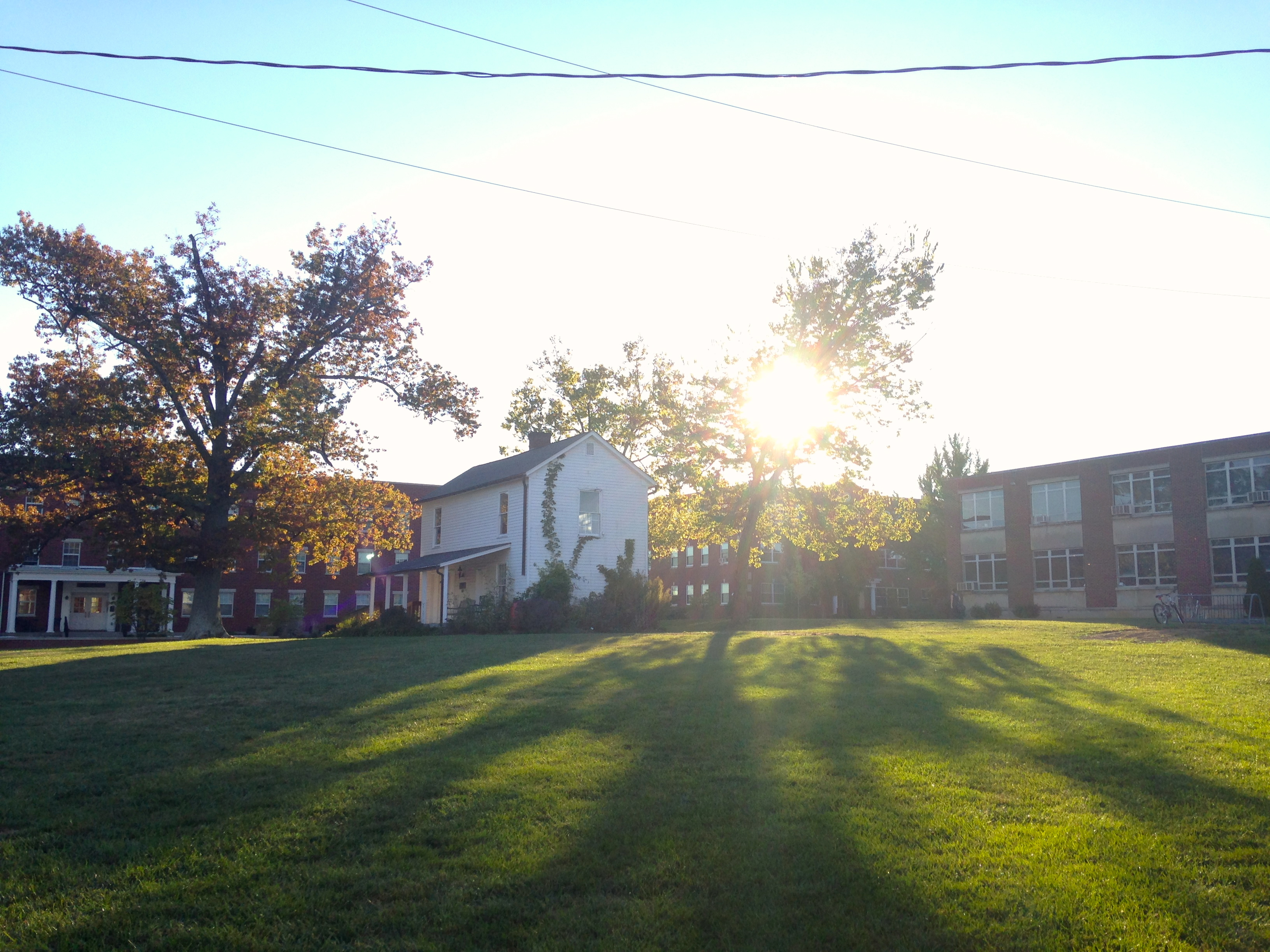
The Old Asbury Building (in white) was the first building, serving as the single schoolhouse for education. It is now used for prayer and meditation.

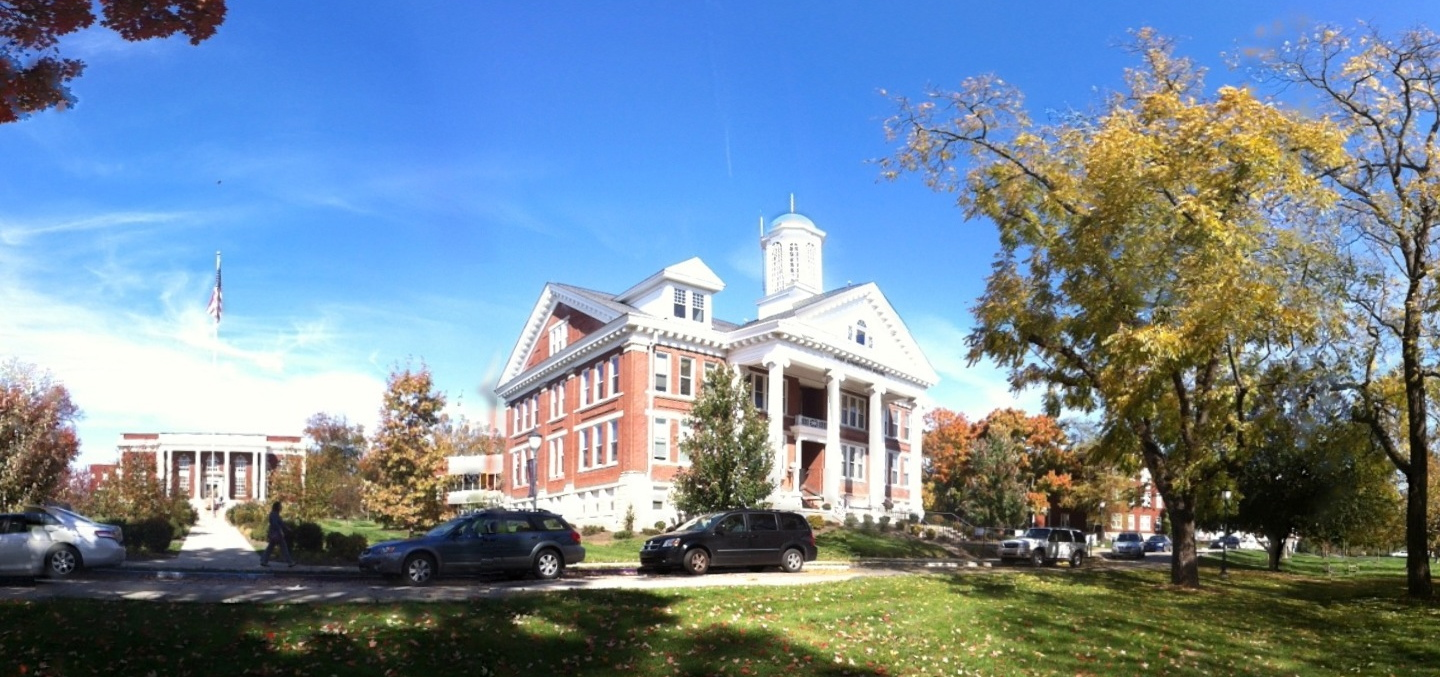
The administration building

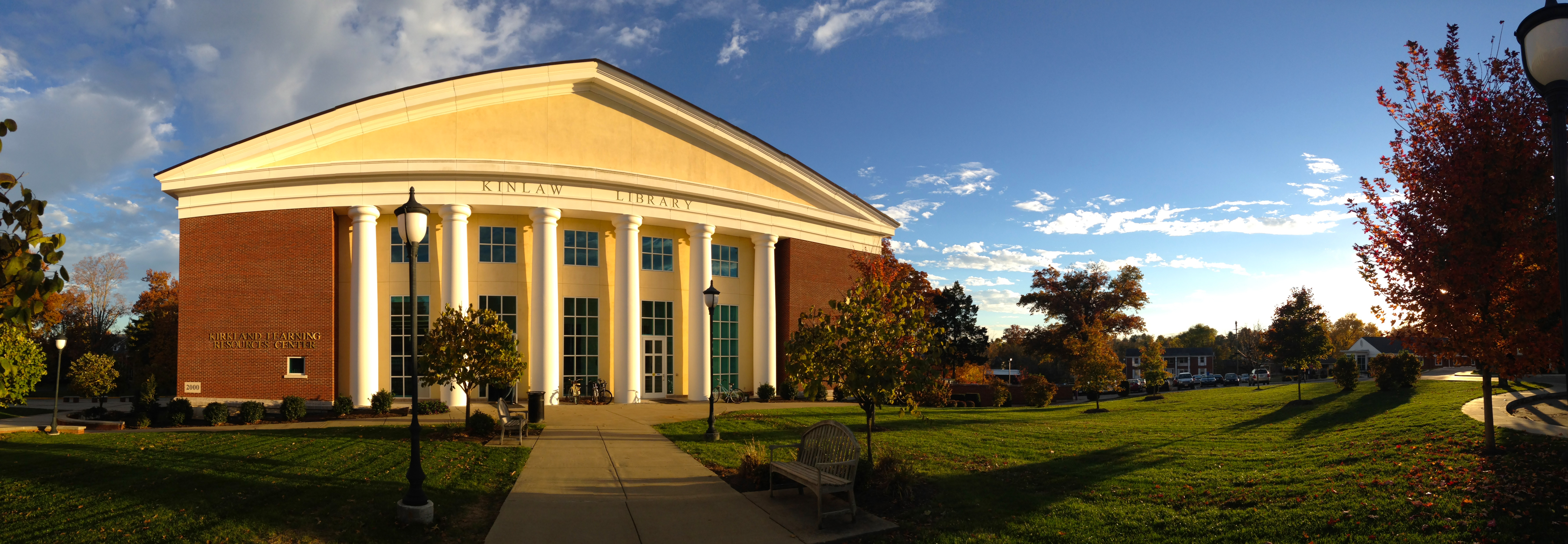
The Kinlaw Library

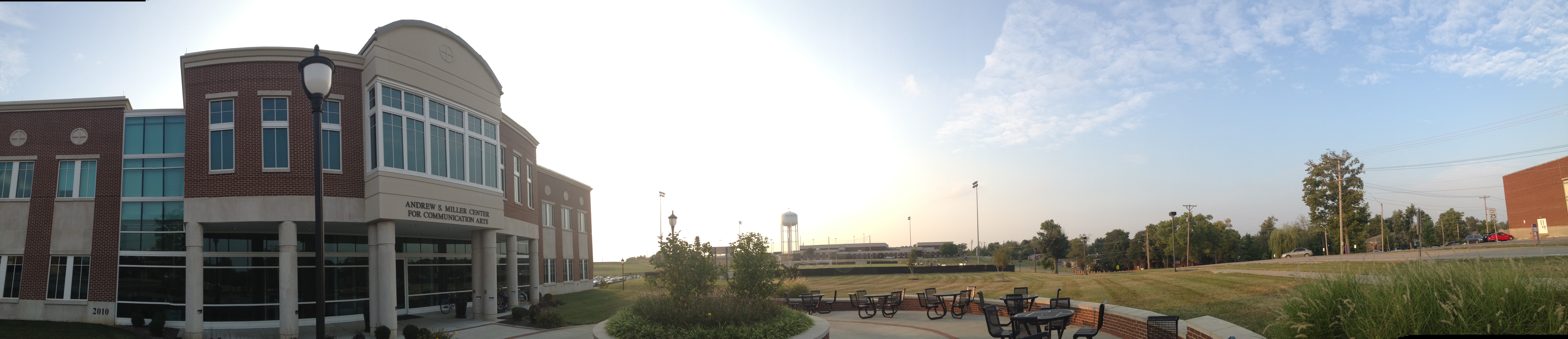
Miller Center for Media Communications

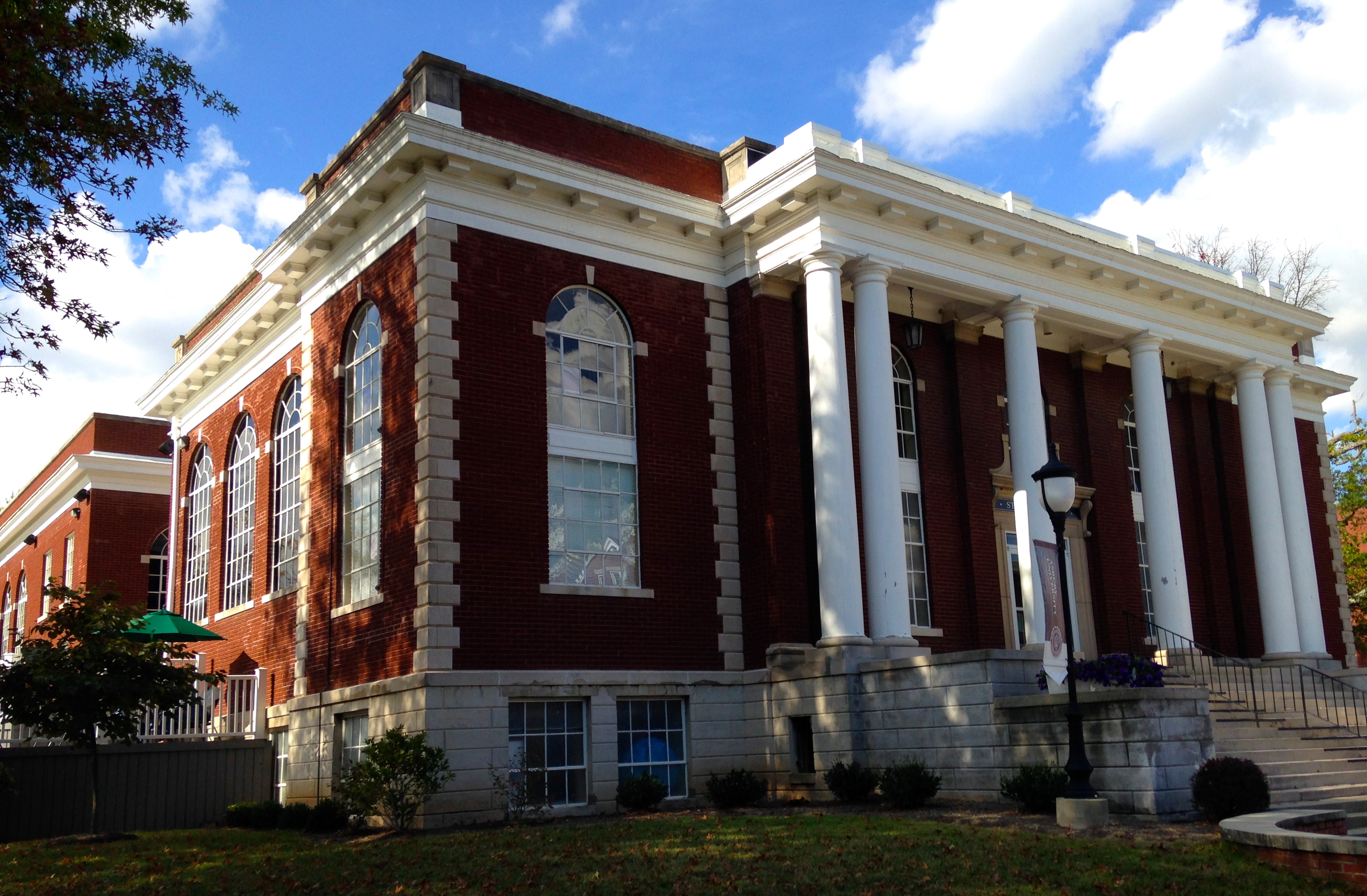
The Student Center

Asbury College was established on September 2, 1890, by John Wesley Hughes in Wilmore, Kentucky. It was originally called Kentucky Holiness College, but the following year was renamed after Bishop Francis Asbury, a circuit-riding evangelist known as the "Father of American Methodism". Bishop Asbury had established the first Methodist school in the United States west of the Appalachians, Bethel Academy, in 1790; its site lies near High Bridge, only about four miles (6 km) south of Wilmore.

After being pushed out as President of Asbury College in 1905, Hughes went on to found another college, Kingswood College, in Breckinridge County, Kentucky. Kingswood College no longer exists. Despite his disappointment over being removed at Asbury, Hughes wrote in his 1923 autobiography:

Being sure I was led of God to establish (Asbury College), it being my college child born in poverty, mental perplexity, and soul agony, I loved it from its birth better than my own life. As the days have come and gone, with many sad and broken-hearted experiences, my love has increased. My appreciation of what it has done, what it is doing, and what it promises to do in the future, is such that I am willing to lay down my life for its perpetuation.

In 1928, Hughes was invited to break ground for Asbury College's new chapel, Hughes Auditorium, which is still in use today.

In 2001 The Kinlaw Library was completed. It was named in honor of Dennis F. Kinlaw and his wife Elsie. It contains over 150,000 items in several collections. There are three floors and most of the collections are on the main and top floors.

The college's immediate past president, Sandra C. Gray, was inaugurated as the seventeenth president of Asbury on October 5, 2007. She was the institution's first female president.

On March 5, 2010, Asbury College became Asbury University. The current president is Kevin Brown, a former faculty member of the university's Dayton School of Business. He was inaugurated as the eighteenth president on March 6, 2020.

Asbury University is a member of the Wesleyan Holiness Connection.

=== Presidents ===
Presidents of the institution include:

- John Wesley Hughes (1890–1905)
- Francis F. Fitch (1905)
- Benjamin Franklin Haynes (1905–1908)
- Newton Wray (1908–1909)
- Aaron S. Watkins (1909–1910)
- Henry Clay Morrison (1910–1925; 1933–1940)
- Lewis Robeson Akers (1925–1933)
- Z.T. Johnson (1940–1966)
- Karl K. Wilson (1966–1967)
- Cornelius R. Hager (1967–1968; 1981–1983; 1992–1993)
- Dennis F. Kinlaw (1968–1981; 1986–1991)
- John N. Oswalt (1983–1986)
- Edwin G. Blue (1991–1992)
- David J. Gyertson (1993–2000)
- Paul A. Rader (2000–2006)
- William C. Crothers (2006–2007)
- Sandra C. Gray (2007–2019)
- Kevin J. Brown (2019–present)

== Academics ==
=== Undergraduate admissions ===
Asbury students come from 44 states and 43 countries. A required essay or personal statement and letters of recommendation are considered for admission. In 2024, Asbury University accepted 64.1% of undergraduate applicants, with admission standards considered "challenging" and those admitted having an average 3.65 high school GPA. The university does not require submission of standardized test scores, Asbury being test blind school such that standardized scores are "not considered for admission, even if submitted." Those accepted that obtained test scores had an average 1080–1320 SAT score or average 21–28 ACT score.

=== Faculty and curriculum ===
Eighty-two percent of the school's faculty hold terminal degrees in their field of study. The university has 59 undergraduate majors and multiple minors and emphases. Internships, exchange programs, study abroad, cross-culture opportunities, missions, and community service opportunities are available and are part of the curriculum in nearly every major. Asbury has a large general education liberal arts requirement ranging from 39 to 57 semester hours. The university also has an Honors Program and online programs. The university has a 12:1 student to faculty ratio and a retention rate of 82 percent on average. Nearly 90 percent of the university's students live on campus.

Programs are divided into five units:

- College of Arts, Humanities & Social Sciences
- Dayton School of Business
- School of Communication Arts
- School of Education
- Shaw School of Sciences

=== Graduate degrees ===
Graduate degrees include: Master's in Business Administration, Graduate Education degrees, Master of Arts in Communication, Master of Arts in Digital Storytelling, Master of Arts in Instructional Design, Innovation & Leadership, Master of Fine Arts in Film/TV Production, and Master of Fine Arts in Screenwriting.

Academic rankings

Master's
- Washington Monthly: 221

Regional
- U.S. News & World Report: 31

National
- Forbes: 565
- WSJ/College Pulse: 601–800

=== Rankings ===
Out of 136 universities, Asbury University was ranked tied for No.31 in the Regional Universities South category by U.S. News & World Report in their annual Best Colleges rankings in 2025. The institution was also ranked No.14 for Best Value Schools and No.36 in Best Colleges for Veterans both also out of 136 universities.

== Athletics ==
The Asbury athletic teams are called the Eagles. The university is a member of NCAA Division III, primarily competing as a member of the Collegiate Conference of the South after having completed a transition from the National Association of Intercollegiate Athletics (NAIA) at the end of the 2023–24 academic year. It is also a member of the National Christian College Athletic Association (NCCAA), primarily competing as an independent in the Mid-East Region of the Division I level.

Asbury competes in 17 intercollegiate varsity sports: Men's sports include baseball, basketball, cross country, golf, soccer, swimming, tennis, and track & field; while women's sports include basketball, cross country, golf, soccer, softball, swimming, tennis, track & field, and volleyball; and co-ed sports include cheerleading. Club sports include roundnet, disc golf, and pickleball.

Track & field is the university's most recent varsity program, having begun competition in the 2023–24 academic year.

=== Move to NCAA Division III ===
On March 25, 2021, Asbury was approved to begin an expedited three-year transition into NCAA Division III from the NAIA. During the transition it was allowed to compete in Division III, but would not be eligible for any NCAA post-season play until 2024. The school announced it would compete in post-season competitions of the NCCAA during the transition.

== Notable alumni ==
There are more than 20,000 living alumni who live in all 50 US states and at least 80 countries. Notable alumni include:

- Frederick Bohn Fisher (Class of 1902) – Bishop of the Methodist Episcopal Church in India
- Andrew N. Johnson (Class of 1903) – Methodist minister, U.S. vice presidential candidate from the Prohibition Party (1944)
- Luther B. Bridgers (Class of 1906 – did not graduate, Honorary Doctorate 1921) – pastor, evangelist, hymnwriter ("He Keeps Me Singing")
- E. Stanley Jones (AB, 1907) – missionary, evangelist, author and theologian
- J. Waskom Pickett (Class of 1907) – missionary to India
- Lela G. McConnell (Class of 1924) – founder of the Kentucky Mountain Holiness Association
- Z.T. Johnson (Class of 1925) – Methodist minister, Asbury College President (1940–1966)
- Edward L.R. Elson (Class of 1928) – pastor of National Presbyterian Church in Washington, D.C.; Chaplain of the United States Senate (1969–1981)
- Anna Talbott McPherson (Class of 1929) – author of more than 22 biographies, book illustrator and artist
- James B. Pritchard (Class of 1930) – Biblical archaeologist
- Mack B. Stokes (Class of 1932) – a Bishop of the United Methodist Church
- Cornelius R. Hager (Class of 1934) – three-time President of Asbury College (1967–1968; 1981–1983; 1992–1993)
- Laton E. Holmgren (Class of 1936) – General Secretary of the American Bible Society (1963–1978)
- Wayne K. Clymer (AB, 1939) – a Bishop of the United Methodist Church
- Dennis F. Kinlaw (Class of 1943) – author, theologian, evangelist, Asbury College President (1968–81; 1986–91)
- Rosalind Rinker (Class of 1945) – author of Prayer: Conversing with God, selected by Christianity Today magazine as the #1 most influential book shaping the way evangelicals think
- Ben Campbell Johnson (Class of 1953) – Professor Emeritus of Evangelism at Columbia Theological Seminary, author
- Dean Jones (Class of 1953 – did not graduate, Honorary Degree 2002) – actor
- Ernie Steury (Class of 1953) – missionary doctor, Tenwek Mission Hospital, Kenya
- Paul Rader (Class of 1956) – General of Salvation Army (1994–1999), Asbury College President (2000–2006)
- Joe Frank Harris (Class of 1958 – transferred to the University of Georgia) – former Democratic Governor of Georgia
- Janice Shaw Crouse (Class of 1961) – Senior Fellow at the Beverly LaHaye Institute of Concerned Women for America
- Joseph R. Pitts (Class of 1961) – United States Representative from Pennsylvania
- Ted Strickland (AB, 1963) – former Democratic Governor of Ohio and former U.S. Representative
- Leopold Frade (Class of 1965 – did not graduate) – Third Bishop of Episcopal Diocese of Southeast Florida and former Bishop of Honduras
- David Hager (Class of 1968) – physician and author
- Stephen W. Wood (Class of 1973) – past member of the North Carolina General Assembly
- Steve Smith (Class of 1977) – Head Basketball Coach at Oak Hill Academy in Mouth of Wilson, VA
- Sue Bell Cobb (Class of 1978) – former Chief Justice of the Alabama Supreme Court (first woman to hold this position)
- Joe Hilley (Class of 1978) – New York Times best-selling author
- Jody Hice (Class of 1980) – United States Representative from Georgia
- Stevenson Kuartei (Class of 1980) – Senator, Palau National Congress; Minister of Health, Republic of Palau (2008–12); Physician and Author
- Gregory Van Tatenhove (Class of 1982) – Judge of the United States District Court for the Eastern District of Kentucky
- Andy Merrill (Class of 1990) – voice artist, Space Ghost Coast to Coast, Cartoon Planet, Aqua Teen Hunger Force, and The Brak Show
- Jessica Ditto (Class of 2004) – White House Deputy Director of Communications for the Donald J. Trump administration
- Nathan W. Pyle (Class of 2004) – cartoonist and writer

== See also ==
- Holiness movement – Beliefs and practices that emerged from 19th-century Methodism
- Ichthus Festival – Christian music festival in Kentucky
- 2023 Asbury Revival – Christian revival in Asbury, Kentucky, US
