= Church of God by Faith =

- Classification: Methodism
- Orientation: Holiness
- Theology: Wesleyan
- Polity: Episcopal
- Founder: John Bright
- Origin: 1914; Jacksonville, Florida
- Congregations: 200

The Church of God by Faith is a Pentecostal denomination aligned with the holiness movement. It is based in the United States. The Church of God by Faith was organized by the Christian minister John Bright in 1914.

== History ==
The Church of God By Faith, Inc. is a religious institution founded in 1914 in Jacksonville, Florida, United States, by John Bright, Aaron Matthews, Sr., Nathaniel Scippio and Hubert Steadman. In 1922 an assembly was held in Alachua, Florida, US, a charter was drafted, and the name Church of God By Faith, Inc. officially adopted. Since 1987 the annual meetings of the church have been held in Atlanta, Georgia. Hubert Steadman became the first Executive Secretary and Editor for the Sunday School literature and other publications.

The first assembly meeting of the church was held in 1917 at White Springs, Florida; after which, missions were set up in various places. Palatka, Florida, was the "headquarters" of the group in 1919. A General Assembly was held in Alachua, Florida, in 1922 where the leading elders drafted a charter, now known as the "Church of God By Faith, Inc." The General Assembly was moved from Alachua to Ocala, Florida, in December 1941. In 1987, the church went annually to Atlanta, Georgia, where meetings are still held.

The Church of God by Faith, Inc. has had four bishops:

1. Aaron Matthews, Sr.: 1915–1959;
2. Willie W. Matthews: 1959–1984;
3. James E. McKnight, Sr: 1984–2014;
4. James E. McKnight, Jr.: Presiding

== Beliefs ==
The church stands in the holiness tradition of teaching that entire sanctification is an instantaneous work obtained by faith, but must be preceded through the consecration of the individual. It believes in divine healing, but does not reject the use of medicine and doctors.

Articles of Faith

God is first in the Godhead - the church believes in one eternally existent, infinite God, sovereign of the universe. He only is God, creative and administrative, holy in nature attributes and purpose. He as God, is first in the Godhead, an essential being, revealed as Father, Son and the Holy Spirit.

Jesus Christ- the church believes in Jesus Christ, the second person of the Godhead. Christ was eternally one with the Father. He became incarnate by the Holy Spirit and was born of the Virgin Mary so that two whole and perfect natures, (the Godhead and manhood) are thus united in one person, very God and very man, the God-man. The church believes that Jesus Christ died for its member's sins and that He rose from the dead and took again His body, together with all things appertaining to the perfection of man's nature, wherewith He ascended into Heaven and is there engaged in intercession for members.

The Holy Spirit- the church believes in the Holy Spirit, the third person of the Godhead. The Holy Spirit is ever present and efficiently active in and with the church of Christ, convincing the world of sin, regenerating those who repent and believe, sanctifying believers and guiding them into all truth as it is in Jesus.

Holy Scriptures- the church believes in the plenary inspiration of the Holy Scriptures. The sixty-six books of the Old and New Testaments are given by divine inspiration, revealing the will of God concerning members in all things necessary to their salvation, so that whatever is not contained therein is not to be enjoined as an article of faith.

Original Sin of Depravity- the church believes that original sin or depravity is that corruption of the nature of all the offspring of Adam by reason of which everyone is very far gone from original righteousness or the pure state of our first parents at the time of their creation, is averse to God, is without spiritual life and inclined to evil, and that it continues to exist with the new life of the regenerate until eradicated by the baptism of the Holy Spirit.

Atonement - the church believes that Jesus Christ, by His suffering, the shedding of His blood, and His meritorious death on the cross, made a full atonement for all human sin. This atonement is the only grounds for salvation and that it is sufficient for every individual of Adam's race.

Free Agency - the church believes that man's creation in God's likeness included the ability to choose between right and wrong. Thus, man was made morally responsible and through the fall of Adam he became depraved. So, he can not now turn and prepare himself by his own natural strength and works of faith and calling upon God. But only by the grace of God, through Jesus Christ that is freely bestowed upon all men, enabling all who will to turn from sin to righteousness. Members believe in Jesus Christ for pardon and the cleansing from sin, and believe that man, though in possession of the experience of regeneration and entire sanctification, may fall from grace and apostatize, and unless he repents of his sin, will be hopelessly and eternally lost.

Repentance - the church believes that repentance, which is a sincere and thorough change of mind in regard to sin, involving a sense of personal guilt and voluntary turning away from sin is demanded of all who have by act or purpose become sinners against God. The Spirit of God gives to all that will repent the gracious help of penitence of heart and hope of mercy, that they may believe unto pardon and spiritual life.

Justification and Adoption - the church believes that justification is that gracious and judicial act of God by which He grants full pardon of all guilt and complete release from the penalty of sins committed and acceptance as righteous to all who believe and receive Jesus Christ as Lord and Savior. Members are expected to believe that regeneration or the new birth is that gracious work of God whereby the moral nature of the repentant believer is spiritually quickened and given a distinctively spiritual life, capable of faith, love and obedience. Members are expected to believe that adoption is that gracious act of God by which the justified and regenerated believer is constituted a "Son of God". Justification, regeneration and adoption are simultaneous in the experience of seekers after God and are obtained upon the condition of faith, preceded by repentance.

Entire Sanctification - the church believes that entire sanctification is the act of God, subsequent to regeneration, by which believers are made free from original sin or depravity, and brought into a state of entire devotion to God and the Holy obedience of love is made perfect. It is wrought by the baptism of the Holy Spirit and comprehends in one experience the cleansing of the heart from sin and the abiding indwelling presence of the Holy Spirit, empowering the believer for life and service. Entire sanctification is provided by the blood of Jesus, is wrought instantaneously by faith, preceded by entire consecration. This experience is also known as "Christian Perfection", "Heart Purity", and "The Baptism of the Holy Ghost" and"Christian Holiness."

Second Coming of Christ - the church believes that Jesus Christ will come again. It believes that members who are alive at his coming will not precede those who are dead, but that they will be caught up with the risen saints to meet the Lord in the air.

Resurrection, Judgement and Destiny - the church believes in the resurrection of the dead. That the bodies of both the just and the unjust will be resurrected and united with their spirit. Members are expected to believe in future judgment in which every man shall appear before God to be judged according to his deeds in this life.

Divine Healing - the church believes in the Bible doctrine of divine healing and urges its congregates to seek the prayer of faith for the healing of the sick. Medical consultants and agencies when deemed necessary are not condemned.

== Organization ==
National headquarters are located in Jacksonville, Florida. Churches are up and down the eastern seaboard of the United States from New York to Florida – with a few churches in Texas, the Midwest and in the state of Washington. There are also dozens of international affiliated ministries.

== Membership ==
As of 2020 the Church of God by Faith, Inc. had over 189 churches and dozens of international affiliates.
