= David Hager =

American physician

- Born: United States
- Occupation: Physician

W. David Hager is an American physician with a medical board certification in obstetrics and gynecology. In the fall of 2002, Hager, a leading conservative Christian voice on women's health and sexuality, was appointed to the Advisory Committee for Reproductive Health Drugs in the Food and Drug Administration (FDA) by U.S. President George W. Bush.

== Family life ==
In 1970, Hager married Linda Carruth Davis, the daughter of a Methodist evangelist. Together they had three sons. David and Linda Hager's marriage ended by divorce in 2002. In November 2002 Linda, herself a religious and political conservative, was remarried to James Davis, a United Methodist minister.

In 2003 Hager married Lexington physician Kathleen Martin; in 2007, Martin filed for divorce from Hager.

== Education and certification ==
Hager in 1964 was graduated from Jessamine County High School in Nicholasville, Kentucky. Hager received his undergraduate degree from Asbury College where his father, Cornelius Hager, was the college president. Hager graduated from medical school at University of Kentucky in 1972, and completed an ob/gyn residency at University of Kentucky in 1976. Hager has been board certified in obstetrics and gynecology since 1978.

== Career ==
Hager is a practicing gynecologist in Lexington, Kentucky. After completing his OB/GYN residency, Hager was a clinical research investigator for sexually transmitted diseases at the Centers for Disease Control and Prevention in Atlanta from 1976 to 1978. He had a faculty position at Emory University from 1976 to 1978, and has been a part-time "professor" at the University of Kentucky since 1978. ("Though his resume describes Hager as a University of Kentucky professor, a university official says Hager's appointment is part time and voluntary and involves working with interns at Lexington's Central Baptist Hospital, not the university itself." Time citation below) His research interests include mastitis, post-operative infections, Group B Strep infections, and vaginitis. Hager was president of Infectious Disease Society for Obstetrics and Gynecology from 1996 to 1998. He was also named as one of the "Best Doctors in America" in both 1994 and 1996. Other present and past affiliations include, the Focus on the Family's Physician Resource Council and the Christian Medical and Dental Society's Physician Resource Council. Hager was previously a member of Asbury College's board of trustees.

Additionally, President George W. Bush appointed Hager to serve on the Honorary Delegation to accompany him to Jerusalem for the celebration of the 60th anniversary of the State of Israel in May 2008.

== Controversy over FDA advisory committee appointment ==
Hager's appointment became more divisive when on May 6, 2004, the FDA rejected the December 16, 2003 Advisory Committee 23 to 4 vote to drop the prescription-only status of emergency contraception, and refused to approve the sale of Plan B over the counter.

First, The Nation, and then The Washington Post and Lexington Herald-Leader reported that Hager spoke at Asbury College in Wilmore, Kentucky, about his role in persuading the FDA to keep Plan B a prescription-only drug. Hager said, "I was asked to write a minority opinion that was sent to the commissioner of the FDA. For only the second time in five decades, the FDA did not abide by its advisory committee opinion, and the measure was rejected."

Further concerns with his candidacy arose with his beliefs and medical assertions penned in the book "Stress and The Woman's Body", co-written with his ex-wife Linda Carruth-Davis. In the book, his writings emphasized the "restorative power of Jesus Christ in one's life" and recommended specific Scripture readings and prayers for such ailments as headaches and premenstrual syndrome.

== Publications ==
=== Journal articles ===
1. Hager WD. Treatment of metronidazole-resistant Trichomonas vaginalis with tinidazole: case reports of three patients. Sex Transm Dis. 2004 Jun;31(6):343–5
2. Stanford JB, Hager WD, Crockett SA.The FDA, politics, and plan B. N Engl J Med. 2004 Jun 3;350(23):2413–4; author reply 2413–4.
3. Larsen JW, Hager WD, Livengood CH, Hoyme U. Guidelines for the diagnosis, treatment and prevention of postoperative infections. Infect Dis Obstet Gynecol. 2003;11(1):65–70.
4. Fitch JT, Stine C, Hager WD, Mann J, Adam MB, McIlhaney J. Condom effectiveness: factors that influence risk reduction. Sex Transm Dis. 2002 Dec;29(12):811–7.
5. David Hager, W., Schuchat, Anne, Gibbs, Ronald, Sweet, Richard, Mead, Philip, Larsen, John W. PREVENTION OF PERINATAL GROUP B STREPTOCOCCAL INFECTION: CURRENT CONTROVERSIES Obstet Gynecol 2000 96: 141–145
6. McGregor JA, Hager WD, Gibbs RS, Schmidt L, Schulkin J. Assessment of office-based care of sexually transmitted diseases and vaginitis and antibiotic decision-making by obstetrician-gynecologists. Infect Dis Obstet Gynecol. 1998;6(6):247–51.
7. Hager WD, Barton JR. The treatment of sporadic acute puerperal mastitis. IDOG 1996;4:97–101.
8. McGregor J, Hager WD, Eschenbach DS, Mead P, Sweet RL, Gibbs RS. Modes of practice in OB-GYN infections. Obstet Gynecol 83:631–36, 1994.
9. Barton JR, Thorpe EM, Shaver DC, Hager WD, et al. Nonimmune hydrops fetalis associated with maternal infection with syphilis. Am J Obstet Gynecol 167:56, 1992.
10. Hager WD, Rapp RP, Billeter M, Bradley BB. The choice of an antibiotic for women undergoing non-elective cesarean section. J Anti Agents and Chemo 35:1782,1991.
11. Hager WD, Bird M, Callahan JC, Frank AL, David ML, Engelberg J. Promiscuity and public health: some clinical and ethical issues. Hosp Pract. 1990 Sep 15;25(9):63, 66, 69–70+
12. Hager WD, Sweet RL, Charles D, Larsen B. Comparative study of mezlocillin versus cefotaxime single dose prophylaxis in patients undergoing vaginal hysterectomy. Current Therapeutic Research, 45:63–9, 1989.

=== Books ===
1. Hager WD, Hager LC. STRESS AND THE WOMAN'S BODY. Fleming H. Revell, a division of Baker Book House, Grand Rapids, MI, 1996.
2. Mead P, Hager WD. INFECTION PROTOCOLS FOR OBSTETRICS AND GYNECOLOGY. Medical Economics Company, Montvale, New Jersey, 1992, Revised 1998.
3. Hager WD, Joy, D Women at Risk: The Real Truth about Sexually Transmitted Disease.

== Sources ==
- Lexington Herald-Leader (KY) GYNECOLOGIST EXPECTS TO BE OFF PANEL May 13, 2005 Frank Lockwood
- Lexington Herald-Leader (KY) A PHYSICIAN AND A LIGHTNING ROD JUNE 12, 2005 Sarah Vos
