= 2023 Asbury revival =

Christian revival in Asbury, Kentucky, US

- Part of Methodism
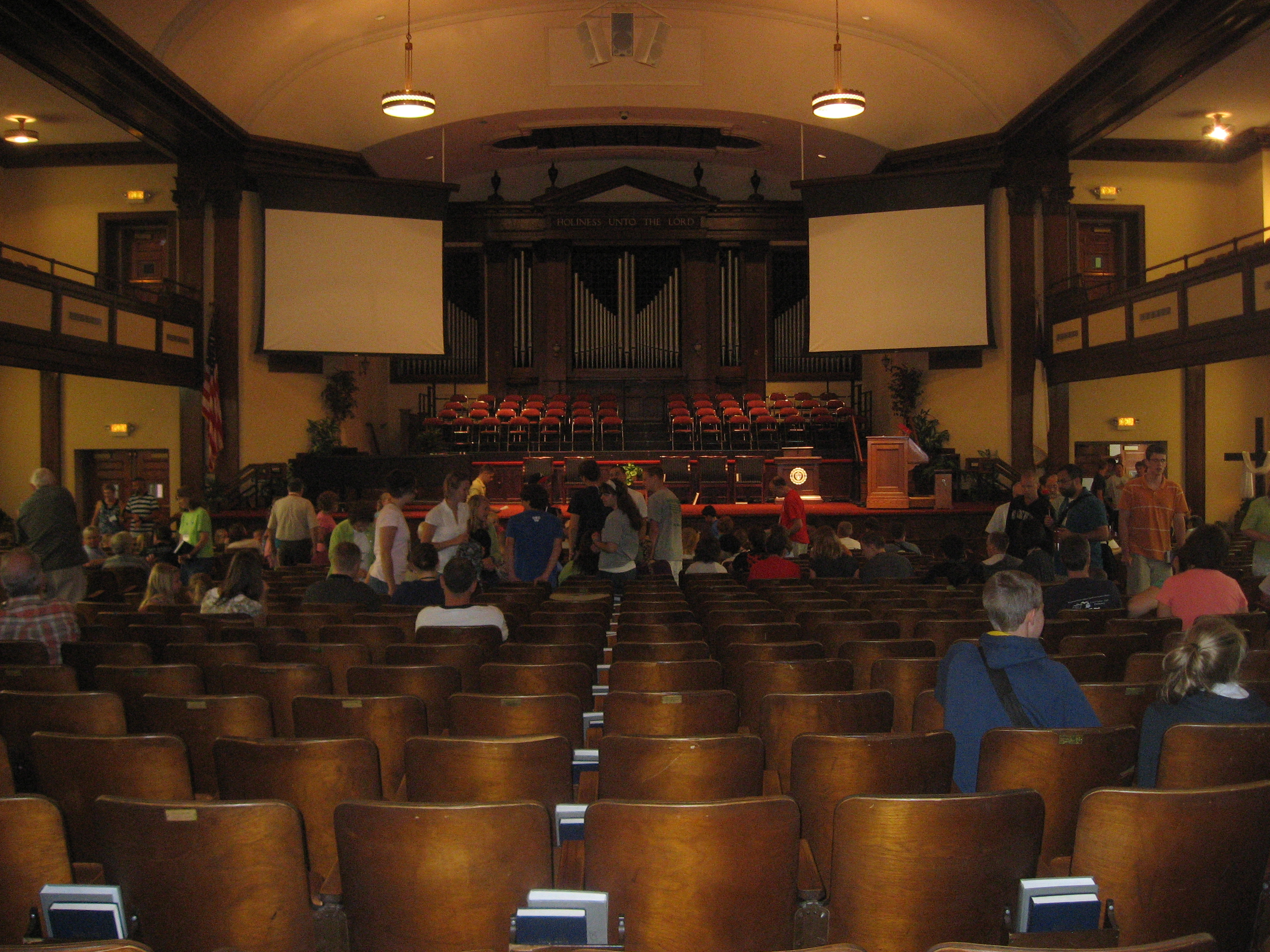
- The interior of Hughes Auditorium
- Duration: February 8, 2023–February 24, 2023
- Venue: (Initially) Hughes Auditorium on the campus of Asbury University (Subsequently) Other buildings in Wilmore, McKenna and Estes Chapels on the campus of Asbury Theological Seminary; Great Commission Church and Mt Freedom Baptist Church.
- Location: Asbury University (primary) and other colleges and seminaries in the United States
- Also known as: Asbury Outpouring, Asbury Awakening
- Cause: Undergraduate students remaining in Hughes Auditorium after weekly chapel services for spontaneous worship and prayer.
- Participants: 50,000–70,000

The 2023 Asbury revival was a Christian revival at Asbury University in Wilmore, Kentucky. The revival was sparked by students spontaneously staying in Hughes Auditorium following a regularly scheduled chapel service on February 8, 2023. Following the gathering, Asbury President Kevin Brown sent out a brief two-sentence email: "There's worship happening in Hughes. You're welcome to join." The news of the phenomenon quickly spread through social media and in Christian online publications. The revival has been compared to similar revivals at Asbury, notably one that took place in 1970. Notably, news of the revival largely spread on social media, as the participants were mainly members of Generation Z. It was attended by approximately 15,000 people each day. By its end, the revival brought 50,000–70,000 visitors to Wilmore, representing more than 200 academic institutions and multiple countries.

== Background ==
Asbury University is a private Christian liberal arts university affiliated with the Wesleyan-Holiness movement, with chapel attendance being mandatory for students on designated weekdays. On Wednesday, February 8, 2023, a handful of students remained in the chapel following a regularly scheduled service. Undergrad Alison Perfater, student body president at the time, said in an interview with Tucker Carlson, that it was after a fellow student decided to openly confess some of his sins to the small group when "the atmosphere changed". According to Perfater:

For seemingly no reason at first on Wednesday, February 8 it didn't end. That's kind of the logistical side of what's been going on. On the deeper side of things, what's been happening here since Wednesday is there's a young army of believers who are rising to claim Christianity, the faith, as their own, as a young generation and as a free generation, and that's why people cannot get enough.

Initially only student publications, Methodist circles, and some social media posts shared news of the event. Asbury's history of revivals dates back to 1905, 1908, 1921, 1950, 1958, 1970, 1992, and 2006. The 1970 revival at Asbury had far-reaching cultural effects, and remains central to the construction of Asbury's spiritual identity. The revival has been described as calm, with some commentators having noted the absence of many contemporary worship features. The revival was additionally significant because of its spread on social media, particularly among Generation Z, the most irreligious generation in US history. On February 15, the hashtag "asburyrevival" had over 24 million views on TikTok, which increased to 63 million by February 18.

Responses to the revival in the same time-frame were reported at other university campuses, such as Samford University, Cedarville University and University of the Cumberlands. The revival notably is ecumenical in its expression, with Methodist, Baptist, Episcopal, and Roman Catholic groups participating in its spread. Visitors told The Washington Post stories of "miracles and healing" they witnessed at the event, along with unparalleled hospitality by locals and students.

== Timeline ==
Date	Event	Notes
8 February 2023	Undergraduates remain in the auditorium following the conclusion of the morning chapel service for prayer. The first report of the revival is in the student newspaper, The Asbury Collegian. News of the phenomenon spread on social media via the personal accounts of students.	Similarities are immediately noted with a similar religious revival at Asbury in 1970.
9 February 2023	Students remain in the auditorium throughout the night. The revival continues into its second day.	It is estimated that the crowd drops to 50 at its lowest point in the night.
10 February 2023	Students remain in the auditorium throughout the day. Students begin to set up coffee stations. While non-students are present, the participants appear to be largely members of the student body. The event starts to receive coverage from local media.	Online pictures of the auditorium show it at capacity.
11 February 2023	The revival continues through the fourth day. Crowds begin to swell in Hughes Auditorium as local media coverage continues.	Online pictures of the auditorium show it beyond capacity.
12 February 2023	Revival continues into its fifth day. Buses and vans from various churches and other religious institutions are observed arriving at Asbury for the revival. Asbury Theological Seminary's Estes Chapel, McKenna Chapel, and other buildings on campus are open for overflow crowds.	Facebook group is started to collect media of the event Asbury University Revival / Outpouring
13 February 2023	Revival continues into its sixth continuous day. Asbury Theological Seminary's Estes Chapel continues to be open for overflow crowds.	
13 February 2023	Seminarians at Virginia Theological Seminary lead Wesley's Covenant Service in response to the revival. Students at Cedarville University hold a worship service in response to the revival.	The event was organized by the Methodist Society of the Episcopal Church according to an announcement on Twitter. Cedarville University is a Baptist-affiliated institution.
14 February 2023	Revival Continues through the seventh continuous day.	
14 February 2023	At least 22 other institutions travel to Asbury for the revival. Some of these institutions did so in official capacities, while others were unofficial appearances of students and faculty. Students at Campbellsville University and Lee University remain in worship in response to the revival.	Campbellsville is a Baptist-affiliated institution, while Lee is a Church of God-Cleveland affiliated university.
15 February 2023	Revival continues into its eighth day. The revival receives coverage from The Washington Post. Asbury Seminary's regularly scheduled chapel services overflow. Hughes Auditorium is closed by Asbury students to all people 26 and over, a decision made to prioritize the voices of Generation Z. A simulcast of Hughes Auditorium is set up in Estes and McKenna Chapels.	
15 February 2023	Students at Samford University remain in worship in response to the revival according to an announcement from the university's president on Twitter. Students have remained in worship since then.	Samford is a Baptist-affiliated institution.
16 February 2023	Revival continues into its ninth day. An announcement that Hughes Auditorium is closed from 1:00 a.m. to 12:00 p.m. and that livestreaming is banned in Hughes Auditorium and the chapels is made on Asbury University's official Instagram account. Asbury University establishes a set schedule for the revival, published on their website. The university marks February 24 as an end date for services held on Asbury's campus. Asbury sends a letter to the parents of students addressing the revival.	
17 February 2023	Revival continues into its tenth day. Following the university's regularly scheduled chapel service, Hughes Auditorium is opened to the public, again giving seating preference to those in high school through age 25 (Generation Z). At 5pm a fourth external venue, Mt. Freedom Baptist Church, was added to service the thousands lined up in the cold waiting for space in Hughes Auditorium.	Drone footage captures lines several blocks long after Hughes Auditorium is full.
18 February 2023	Revival continues through its eleventh day. Security concerns over "tens of thousands" of visitors heighten among both government and Asbury officials.	
19 February 2023	Revival continues into its twelfth day. Last day of evening services for the public.	
21 February 2023	The university announces the service will be moved to accommodate the significant number of people attending, although the exact location(s) is/are not given.	
24 February 2023	The university announces that no more outpouring services would be scheduled through the university.	

== Measles case ==
An unvaccinated person from Jessamine County, Kentucky, who attended the revival on 18 February 2023 tested positive for the measles following their attendance at the revival. The case was the third in Kentucky in the three months before the revival. Unvaccinated attendees were asked by public health officials to quarantine for 21 days following exposure and then get immunized.

== See also ==
- Evangelicalism
- Ichthus Festival
- Wesleyan theology
