= Z. T. Johnson =

Zachary Taylor Johnson (1897–1981) was born June 18, 1897, in Athens, Georgia, to a farmer's family. While working as a printer for the Macon News in 1913, Johnson converted to Christianity and felt called of God to preach. He entered Asbury University in September 1913 and transferred to Trevecca College in 1914.

In 1916, Johnson married Sarah Mershon and began serving as a minister in the Southwest Kansas Conference of the Methodist Church. He transferred to the South Georgia Conference in 1918 and completed conference studies at Emory University in 1920. In 1922 he transferred to the Kentucky Conference of the Methodist Church and returned to Asbury College as a student, where he completed an A.B. degree in 1925. He served as athletic director and shorthand instructor at Asbury while pursuing his M.A. at the University of Kentucky, which he completed in 1926.

Johnson served as book editor and circulation manager for the Herald Press from June 1926 to June 1927, at which time he enrolled at George Peabody College for Ph.D. work, completing the degree in 1929. He served as the head of the History Department at Mississippi State College from 1929 to 1934.

In 1934, Johnson was appointed pastor of the Wilmore Methodist Church, where he cleared a long-standing debt. He became Executive Vice President at Asbury College under Dr. Henry Clay Morrison in 1935 while the institution was on the verge of bankruptcy with nearly $5 million of debt. The debt was cleared in 1938, and the college endowment was raised to over half a million dollars by 1939. Asbury College was admitted to the Southern Association of Colleges and Schools as an accredited liberal arts institution in 1940, the same year that Z.T. Johnson assumed the presidency. He was the first alumnus of the college to serve as president.

The longest-tenured president in the school's history to date, Johnson's presidency at Asbury College was marked by growth, both of the student body and the campus physical plant. Campus improvements during his administration included an amphitheater, a nine-hole golf course, an athletic field with a quarter-mile track, a 370-acre (1.5 km^{2}) farm, twenty-one duplexes, a triplex, an 18-unit apartment, eight faculty homes, five dormitories (including the Johnson Men's Dormitory), a student center, a library addition, a fine arts building, a science hall, and the Z.T. Johnson Cafeteria. During his term as president, the student enrollment rose from 526 to 1,135. It was also under Johnson's administration that Asbury College moved to full racial integration in 1962. Johnson retired from the presidency of Asbury College in 1966.

Johnson served as mayor of Wilmore, Kentucky from 1970 to 1972. He died on May 30, 1981, in Lexington, Kentucky, at the age of 83.

== Sources ==
- Asbury College: Vision and Miracle, by Joseph A. Thacker, Jr. (Evangel Press, 1990)
- Who's Who in Methodism (unknown year)
- "Life Sketch", by Asbury College Office of Development (unpublished)
- Obituary, Dr. Z.T. Johnson, Sr., Jessamine Journal, June 4, 1981
- A History of Asbury College Chronology, by Dr. Edward H. McKinley (http://www.asbury.edu/archives/history/chronological)
