= Ben Campbell Johnson =

- Born: March 28, 1932; Elba, Alabama, U.S.
- Died: June 2, 2016 (aged 84); Atlanta, Georgia, U.S.
- Education: Asbury University (BA); Asbury Theological Seminary; Southern Baptist Theological Seminary; San Francisco Theological Seminary; Emory University (PhD)

Ben Campbell Johnson (March 28, 1932 – June 2, 2016) was an American ordained minister in the Presbyterian Church (U.S.A.) and a professor emeritus of evangelism and spiritual direction at Columbia Theological Seminary. He is known for his work in church renewal movements and on interfaith relations between a variety of faith traditions.

== Career ==
Johnson received a B.A. from Asbury College (1953), a B.D. from Asbury Seminary (1955), a Th.M. from Southern Baptist Theological Seminary (1957), a D.Min. from San Francisco Theological Seminary (1978), and a Ph.D. from Emory University (1980). He was ordained as a minister of word and sacrament in the Presbyterian Church (U.S.A.). He was a pastor of United Methodist Church in Kentucky and Alabama (1952–1963), served as an interim supply at Salem Presbyterian Church, Lithonia, Georgia (1979–1980) and as the interim preacher at North Avenue Presbyterian Church, Atlanta, Georgia (1988–1990). During his time as a leader in the church he founded and served as the executive director of the Institute for Church Renewal in Atlanta, Georgia (1963–1980). Beginning in 1981 he served as the professor of evangelism and church growth at Columbia Theological Seminary, where he then became the professor of spirituality in 1995. In 2000, Johnson retired from Columbia Theological Seminary and became a professor emeritus.

== Thought ==
Johnson devoted much of his work to church growth and spiritual formation. Through the Institute of Church Renewal he developed a number of programs and resources for congregations aimed to promote growth and vitality. He furthered this work through founding the Columbia Theological Seminary Press, enabling the publishing of many book and articles intended to educate all church leaders. Seeing church growth as more than simply evangelism, he created and began the Doctor of Ministry in Christian Spirituality at Columbia Theological Seminary, which focuses on "congregational leadership while exploring God's relationship to persons, the community of faith, and the world, including the ethical and social dimensions of spirituality." He also began the Certificate in Spiritual Formation extending the education of spiritual development to all people so to encourage church growth in a variety of ways. This program allows "people in the pulpit, in the pew, in all denominations and stages of life to explore the community-grounded Christian spirituality that is rooted in scripture, theology, a history of the tradition, reading in the spiritual classics, prayer and meditation, and in skills for assisting others on a spiritual journey." Both of these are still important programs that attract and teach church leaders from around the United States.

Johnson's most recent work was focused on creating interfaith relationships between different faith traditions. He fostered relations through Interfaith Community Initiatives, where he served as an advisory board member and program director of the immersion experience. He concentrated particularly on Christian and Muslim relations, publishing Beyond 9/11: Christians and Muslims Together: An Invitation to Conversation (2009).

== Publications ==
- ”The Heart of Paul” A Great Love, Inc. 1976
- An Evangelism Primer. John Knox Press, 1983.
- Rethinking Evangelism. Westminster Press, 1987.
- To Will God's Will. Westminster Press, 1987.
- To Pray God's Will. Westminster Press, 1987.
- Pastoral Spirituality. Westminster Press, 1988.
- Discerning God's Will. Westminster/John Knox Press, 1990.
- Speaking of God. Westminster/John Knox Press. 1991.
- Living the Christian Life. Westminster/John Knox Press, 1992.
- 95 Theses for the Church. Columbia Theological Seminary Press, 1995.
- New Day, New Church. Columbia Theological Seminary Press, 1995.
- Calming the Restless Spirit. Upper Room, 1997.
- Listening for God. Paulist Press, 1997.
- Imagining a Church in the Spirit: A Task for Mainline Congregations. Wm. B. Eerdmans Publishing Co., 1999.
- Living Before God: Deepening our Sense of Divine Presence. Wm. B. Eerdmans Publishing Publishing Co., 1999.
- The Jesus Story: The Most Remarkable Life of All Time. Geneva Press, 2000.
- A Seeker's Guide to Christian Faith: Leader's Guide. Upper Room, 2001.
- Beyond the Ordinary: Spirituality for Church Leaders. Wm. B. Eerdmans Publishing Co., 2001.
- Hearing God's Call: Ways of Discernment for Laity and Clergy. Wm. B. Eerdmans Publishing Co., 2002. (Academy of Parish Clergy, Top Ten Books of the Year, 2003).
- The God Who Speaks: Learning the Language of God. Wm. B. Eerdmans Publishing Co., 2004.
- Godspeech. Wm. B. Eerdmans Publishing Co., 2006.
- Time Away: A Guide for Personal Retreat. Upper Room, 2010.
- Matthew and Mark: A Relational Paraphrase. 2014.
