= Laton E. Holmgren =

Laton E. Holmgren (February 20, 1915 – January 18, 2004) was born in Minneapolis, Minnesota. He attended Asbury College, a liberal arts college located in Wilmore, Kentucky, from which he graduated cum laude in 1936. Following college, he studied for the ministry at Drew University from where he received a Master of Divinity in 1941. The following year he was ordained as a minister in the Methodist Church and served as associate pastor of Christ Church in Manhattan, New York.

In 1949, Holmgren traveled to Japan where he assisted with the post-war recovery effort. He returned to the United States in 1952 and joined the American Bible Society where he assumed responsibility for the Society's work in Asia. While serving in that capacity, he was awarded an honorary Doctorate of Divinity from Illinois Wesleyan University, which he received in 1956. In 1963, Holmgren was named the Society's General Secretary, a post which he held until retirement in 1978. During his tenure with the Society, Holmgren was instrumental in creating The Good News Bible. In 1975, he was honored with the Chicago Bible Society's Gutenberg Award.
