= Rosalind Rinker =

Rosalind Beatrice Rinker (2 April 1906 – 11 January 2002) was a Christian missionary and author.

Rinker was born in New Rockford, North Dakota and served as a missionary in China with the Oriental Mission Society from 1926 to 1940. She then returned to the United States and studied at Asbury College. After her graduation in 1945, she worked as a staff counselor for InterVarsity Christian Fellowship.

Rinker wrote several books, including Prayer: Conversing With God (1959), which in 2006 Christianity Today named the single most influential book on evangelicals over the previous fifty years.
