= Metropolitan Church Association =

Methodist denomination

- Classification: Methodism
- Orientation: Holiness movement
- Polity: Connexionalism
- Separated from: Methodist Episcopal Church
- Members: 55,000

The Metropolitan Church Association, also known as the Metropolitan Methodist Mission and Metropolitan Evangelistic Church, is a Methodist denomination in the holiness movement. The Metropolitan Church Association has congregations throughout the world, and in the 20th century, it possessed intentional communities in Wisconsin, Virginia, West Virginia, Louisiana, and Texas, among other locations.

== History and beliefs ==
The Metropolitan Methodist Mission was founded in the 1890s and gradually entered into schism with the Methodist Episcopal Church. It was initially headquartered in Chicago and then moved to Waukesha. The founders included Edwin L. Harvey and Marmaduke Mendenhall Farson, who "came from pious Methodist homes in Chicago."

The Metropolitan Church Association adheres to Wesleyan-Arminian theology and emphasizes "enthusiastic worship, evangelism, holy living, and communal values." As with the Reformed Free Methodist Church and Emmanuel Association of Churches, the Metropolitan Church Association is among the Holiness Methodist Pacifists, teaching nonresistance and peace. Due to their enthusiastic worship, the members of the Metropolitan Church Association are known as "Holy Jumpers" by those outside the Wesleyan-Holiness movement.

In the United States, the Metropolitan Church Associations once had a periodical called the Burning Bush, which had a circulation of over 100,000.

== Burning Bush intentional communities ==
Burning Bush Colonies were Methodist intentional communities in Wisconsin, Virginia, West Virginia, Louisiana, as well as Smith and Cherokee Counties in Texas, U.S., south of Bullard, on the Smith-Cherokee county line, among others.

In Texas, representatives from the Metropolitan Church Association, commonly called the Society of the Burning Bush, started the colony on a 1,520-acre farm near Bullard in 1912, and in 1913, 375 members of the church arrived at the colony. They constructed a tabernacle and residences. When colonists joined the church, they lived communally and gave up all their possessions. This was also the makeup of the Burning Bush Colony. They ate together in a common dining hall and had a communal storehouse. They sustained themselves mainly through farming, but also through odd jobs in other local communities. The colony did not have much success with farming, and eventually failed, despite support from the Metropolitan Church Association. After the colony failed, some stayed in Texas, but most returned to the North. According to the 1986 book, Ghost Towns of Texas by T. Lindsay Baker, the site of Burning Bush was in Bullard 0.3 miles south of Farm to Market Road 344 across from the Douglas Family Cemetery, which is on County Road 3707.

== Churches ==
In India, the Metropolitan Church Association has more than 50,000 members and in Eswatini, its membership exceeds 1,000. There are six congregations in South Africa with over 600 communicants, where the connexion is known as the Metropolitan Evangelistic Church. In Mexico, there are twenty-five churches. In the United States, the Metropolitan Church Association discontinued its publication of its periodical the Burning Bush in 2016.

== See also ==
- Bruderhof Communities
- House of Prayer (denomination)
