= Church of Daniel's Band =

American Christian church

Church of Daniel's Willis
- Classification: Protestant
- Orientation: Wesleyan-Holiness, Pietist, Evangelical
- Polity: Connexionalism
- Leader: Rev. Wesley James Hoggard
- Region: Michigan, worldwide missions
- Origin: 1893; Marine City, Michigan
- Separated from: Wesleyan Methodist Church
- Congregations: 4
- Members: ca. 200
- Ministers: 8

The Church of Daniel's Band is a Wesleyan-Holiness Christian church originally organized in imitation of the early Methodist class meetings at Marine City, Michigan. The church has four congregations in the U.S. state of Michigan.

== Background ==
The Church of Daniel's Band was founded in 1893 by former members of the Wesleyan Methodist Church. The main premise of the break was the doctrine of divine healing.

In the year of its foundation, it had four to five congregations with anywhere between 120 and 217 members and eight ministers.

The name of the church was chosen based on the title of a sermon delivered by Charles Spurgeon, at the Metropolitan Tabernacle in Newington, London, on August 3, 1890. The sermon, titled "Daniel's Band," related the story of Daniel in the Old Testament. In that sermon, he exhorted his listeners, "The Lord preserved Daniel, and he will preserve you, dear friend, if you belong to 'Daniel's Band.' The church is also called a "band" as a reference to 1800s Wesleyan revival class meetings referred to as "bands" and "societies."

Its doctrines and polity are based on Methodism, though it prefers to be a "non-denominational Christian church." It stresses evangelism, perfectionism, fellowship, religious freedom, and asceticism.

It has historically been a small body, although it did experience a period of growth in the late 1910s and early 1920s. During that time, it grew from four local churches with 129 members to six local churches with 393 members in several states and provinces throughout the U.S. and Canada. Between 1950 and 1951, it again experienced a period of growth, going from 121 members to 200 members. In 2007, reports indicated it had between one and four employees.

All four of the church's congregations are in the state of Michigan. It is registered in Midland, Michigan, with additional congregations in Beaverton, Linwood, and Gladwin.

The Church of Daniel's Band's Campground in Beaverton hosts a week of services and fellowship each August.
