= Henry Clay Morrison =

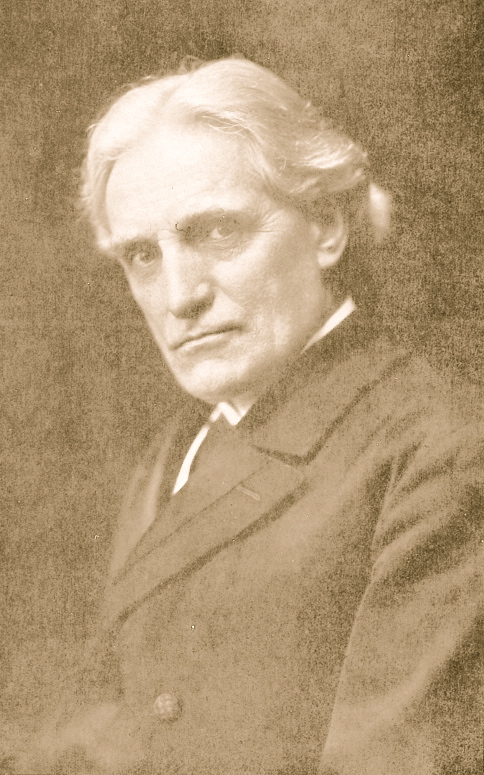
H. C. Morrison, President, Asbury College.

Henry Clay Morrison (March 10, 1857 — March 24, 1942) was a Methodist evangelist, editor, and president of Asbury College and Asbury Theological Seminary.

He is not to be confused with Henry Clay Morrison (b. May 30, 1842), a Methodist bishop from Tennessee.

== Family ==
Morrison was born in Bedford, Trimble County, Kentucky. His parents died when he was very young, and he was reared by his paternal grandfather in Barren County.

== Evangelist ==
Morrison was converted at the age of 13 in a Methodist revival at the Boyd's Creek Meetinghouse near Glasgow, Kentucky. Soon after he felt a call to the ministry. He was licensed to preach at the age of 19 and began his work as circuit rider and station pastor.

In 1890 Morrison left the pastorate and moved into evangelism.

He also began editing a religious publication called The Old Methodist, which later became the widely read Pentecostal Herald. Morrison's reputation as a Methodist evangelist grew rapidly from his home state of Kentucky to most other states and many foreign countries.

The camp meeting became one of his favorite evangelistic venues, and throughout the rest of his life Morrison gave much time and effective leadership to this religious movement. William Jennings Bryan regarded Morrison to be "the greatest pulpit orator on the American continent."

== Asbury College ==
In 1910 Asbury College, a holiness school founded by John Wesley Hughes in Wilmore, Kentucky hired Morrison as its president.

With the help of Morrison's Pentecostal Herald readers and his nationwide reputation as a holiness preacher, Morrison was able to pay off large debts owed by the college, saving it from financial ruin and increasing its reputation and student body in the process.

Morrison was instrumental in founding Asbury Theological Seminary in 1923.

After stepping down as president of Asbury College in 1925, Morrison was asked once again to assume the presidency in 1933 during another financial crisis, serving until 1940.

== Works ==
Morrison published 25 books (all directed toward laymen), including:

- The Presence of God and Other Sermons (undated)
- The Two Lawyers: A Story for the Times (1898)
- Baptism with the Holy Ghost (1900)
- Life Sketches and Sermons (1903)
- World Tour of Evangelism (1911)
- Thoughts for the Thoughtful (1912)
- Romanism and Ruin (1914)
- The Second Coming of Christ (1914)
- Commencement Sermons Delivered in Asbury College Chapel (1915)
- Lectures on Prophecy (1915)
- The World War in Prophecy: The Downfall of the Kaiser and the End of the Dispensation (1917)
- Will a Man Rob God? (192-)
- Sermons for the Times (1921)
- Remarkable Conversions, Interesting Incidents, and Striking Illustrations (1925)
- The Christ of the Gospels (1926)
- The Optimism of Pre-Millennialism (1927)
- The Confessions of a Backslider (193-)
- Crossing the Dead Line (1932)
- Is the World Growing Better or Is the World Growing Worse (1932)
- Will God Set up a Visible Kingdom on Earth? (1934)
- Five Great Needs (194-)
- Some Chapters of My Life Story (1941)
- From Sinai to Calvary: Condensed Sermons on Salvation Themes (1942)

== Death ==
Morrison died in the home of a pastor for whom he was conducting revival meetings in Elizabethton, Tennessee.

== See also ==
- Asbury University
- Asbury Theological Seminary
- Wesleyan theology
- Holiness movement
- Camp meeting

== Sources ==
- Some Chapters of My Life Story, by Henry Clay Morrison (Pentecostal Publishing Co., 1941)
- Asbury College: Vision and Miracle, by Joseph A. Thacker, Jr. (Evangel Press, 1990)
- "Henry Clay Morrison", http://www.believersweb.org/view.cfm?ID=97
- "Dr. H.C. Morrison's Last Moments", by Rev. Solon McNeese
