= Lumber River Conference of the Holiness Methodist Church =

- Classification: Methodism
- Orientation: Holiness movement
- Theology: Wesleyan-Arminian
- Polity: Connexionalism
- Separated from: Methodist Episcopal Church
- Congregations: 11
- Official website: www.lrchmc.org

The Lumber River Conference of the Holiness Methodist Church is a Methodist connexion within the holiness movement.

The foundation of the Lumber River Conference of the Holiness Methodist Church is part of the history of Methodism in the United States; Union Methodist Episcopal Chapel was a congregation of the Methodist Episcopal Church, being established in 1858 in Robeson County, North Carolina. For some time, it was connected with the African Methodist Episcopal Zion Church and then again to the Methodist Episcopal Church. On 26 October 1900 a meeting at Union Methodist Episcopal Chapel, the Lumber River Mission Conference of the Holiness Methodist Church was organized for the purpose of ministering to Native Americans and African Americans, though the connexion always had a membership of people from all racial backgrounds. Many people of the Lumbee tribe joined the Holiness Methodist Church. Since its origin, the Lumber River Conference of the Holiness Methodist Church has preserved the distinctives of early Methodism, such as the class meeting.

As of 1988, the Lumber River Conference of the Holiness Methodist Church has eight churches and three missions.
