= John Wesley Hughes =

American minister

John Wesley Hughes (May 16, 1852 – February 22, 1932) was an American minister and the founder of Asbury College.

== Life ==
Born in Owen County, Kentucky, Hughes was converted at the age of sixteen in a Methodist revival meeting in an old schoolhouse. Hughes attended Kentucky Wesleyan College in Millersburg, Kentucky (now located in Owensboro, Kentucky), and served as a pastor in the Kentucky Conference of the Methodist Church before pursuing further education at Vanderbilt University in Nashville, Tennessee.

After serving twelve years as a pastor and one year as an evangelist, Hughes felt that God was leading him to establish a distinctly religious school where students could receive a thorough college education under the direction of a faculty wholly consecrated to God. Hughes stated:

"We will endeavor, as a faculty, to do all in our power to lead our students to the Biblical experiences of regeneration and entire sanctification and to live daily a consecrated, holy life with warm hearts and cool heads, always endeavoring to tear down the works of the devil and to build up the Kingdom of God."

Hughes opened the Kentucky Holiness College in September 1890 at Wilmore, Kentucky. After a year of operation, Hughes changed the name of the school to Asbury College in honor of Methodist Bishop Francis Asbury, who had organized the Kentucky Conference of the Methodist Church in 1790. Also in 1790, Bishop Asbury had established Bethel Academy, a Methodist school and the only one of its kind west of the Allegheny Mountains, just three and a half miles south of Wilmore. This local connection gave even more meaning to the new name for the college, which Hughes viewed as less pretentious than the original name.

In 1905, after fifteen years as president of Asbury College, the college board of directors asked Hughes to step down for reasons that are not completely clear today. Despite the painful nature of his removal, Hughes would later write in his 1923 autobiography:

"Being sure that I was led of God to establish (Asbury College), it being my college child born in poverty, mental perplexity, and soul agony, I loved it from its birth better than my own life. As the days have come and gone, with many sad and broken-hearted experiences, my love has increased. My appreciation of what it has done, what it is doing, and what it promises to do in the future, is such that I am willing to lay down my life for its perpetuation."

In 1906 Hughes founded Kingswood College in Breckinridge County, Kentucky. He served as president of that institution until he retired in 1917. Mary Wallingford Hughes, Hughes' wife of 33 years (married July 28, 1881), died in 1914.

After retirement, Hughes returned to Wilmore. He later remarried to Sadie Maude Petty, whom he preceded in death. In 1928 Hughes was invited to break ground for Hughes Auditorium at Asbury College (later Asbury University), the school chapel that is still in use today.

Hughes died on February 22, 1932, at his home in Wilmore. His tombstone reads:

"FOUNDER OF ASBURY COLLEGE, HE PROFESSED, ADVOCATED, AND DEFENDED THE DOCTRINE OF SANCTIFICATION AS A SECOND WORK OF GRACE. IN FAITH HE LIVED, IN FAITH HE CONQUERED HIS LAST REQUEST: ‘TELL THE ASBURY PREACHERS TO PREACH THE WHOLE TRUTH AND BE TRUE TO THE BIBLE.'"

== See also ==
- Asbury University (formerly College)
- Wesleyan theology
- Holiness movement

== Sources ==
- Asbury College: Vision and Miracle, by Joseph A. Thacker, Jr. (Evangel Press, 1990)
- The Autobiography of John Wesley Hughes, by John Wesley Hughes (Pentecostal Publishing Co., 1923)
