= Edwin Harvey =

Metropolitan Methodist minister

- Born: 1856; Chicago
- Died: 1926 (aged 69–70)
- Occupation: Methodist minister
- Known for: Leader in the Holiness Movement

Edwin Harvey (1865–1926) was an American Methodist minister and leader in the holiness movement. His emphasis on communal living led to the foundation of the Metropolitan Methodist Mission, which supported the Burning Bush Colony in Texas.

== Early life ==
Edwin Harvey was raised in a pious Methodist home in Chicago. His father Daniel Harvey "was a deliveryman in Chicago, and supplemented his income each summer by selling household products, such as cooking utensils, to downstate farm families." While doing this, Daniel Harvey distributed Gospel tracts to those with whom he conversed.

Edwin Harvey started his career operating a chain of hotels in the same city. He had an experience of the New Birth and shortly thereafter, he began to teach theology classes, eventually becoming the secretary of Chicago's Methodist youth organization. Harvey became passionate about evangelism, which he learned from his father.

In the 1880s, Harvey began to hold prayer meetings in Methodist homes throughout Chicago, where he met Marmaduke Mendenhall Farson. At the Des Plaines Camp Meeting in 1884, Farson had a conversion experience, too, after which Harvey and Farson became close friends who worked together in Christian evangelism.

In 1890, Edwin Harvey married Gertrude Ford.

== Work in the Rocky River Conference of the M.E. Church ==
In 1890, Edwin Harvey and Marmaduke Farson built a church in the Rocky River Conference of the Methodist Episcopal Church. While Farson served as the pastor, Edwin Harvey became the Sunday School superintendent.

In 1894, Edwin Harvey acquired property in the northwest side of Chicago and constructed the Metropolitan Methodist Mission church for US$50,000. The mission offered cooking and sewing classes and a tent revival was held, in which five hundred people approached the altar and prayed at the mourner's benches there.

The Sunday School directed by Edwin Harvey had a weekly average attendance of 800 children, with many being immigrants of Norwegian, Swedish and German backgrounds. The Metropolitan Methodist Mission became characterized for the aid its provided to immigrants. Harvey earned respect in the Methodist community and the Des Plaines Camp Meeting chose Edwin Harvey as its secretary. Beverly Carradine (1848–1931), an evangelist and social reformer from the Methodist Episcopal Church, South was welcomed to preach at the Metropolitan Methodist Mission. He was known for his preaching on dress standards and attacked gambling. His preaching led to many of those who attended Metropolitan Methodist Church to seek an experience of entire sanctification.

== Intentional community ==
The Metropolitan Church Association held a camp meeting in 1902 in Buffalo Rock, Illinois. There, Gertrude Harvey offered to sell her home and donate the proceeds to the Metropolitan Church Association; she sold her wedding ring, silk dresses, and fancy hats as well. Others followed suit, which resulted in over US$100,000 being donated to the Church. The Metropolitan Church Association's ministry expanded to include a Bible college, orphanages, missionary training home, and several churches. Many of those who sold their homes moved to the Bible college, which was the initial thing that helped in the formation of the communitarian character of the Metropolitan Church Association. In 1904, the Burning Bush, which had a circulation of over 100,000, taught a community of goods. Edwin Harvey and Gertrude Harvey said that in the last days, God was calling people to lay "down their money and their reputations and their lives." Harvey himself sold the eleven hotels he owned, which gave the Metropolitan Church Association a considerable amount of capital.

After the Metropolitan Church Association moved its base to Waukesha, Harvey "left the actual direction of the community in the experienced hands of F.M. Messenger as superintendent." Harvey, who served as the secretary-treasurer, was known as a "softhearted man" for his welcoming of any poor person, orphan, or alcoholic into the community.
