= Dennis F. Kinlaw =

American biblical scholar (1922–2017)

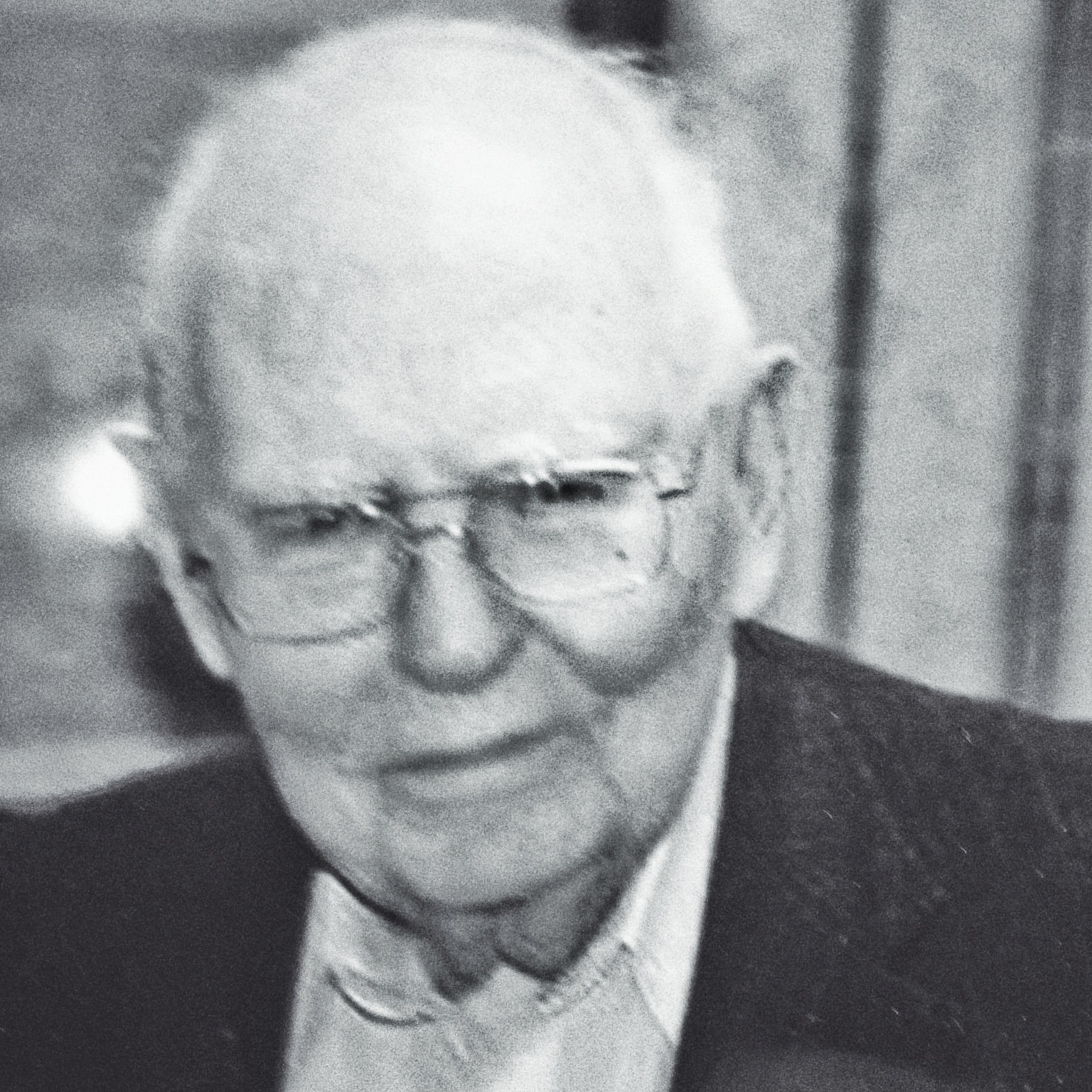
Dennis F. Kinlaw (1922-2017)

Dennis Franklin Kinlaw (June 26, 1922 – April 10, 2017), was an Old Testament Scholar and former President of Asbury College.

== Biography ==
Kinlaw was born in Lumberton, N.C. on June 26, 1922. He held a B.A from Asbury College (1943), an M.Div from Asbury Theological Seminary (1946), and an M.A. and Ph.D. from Brandeis University.

Following graduation, he was a professor of Old Testament Languages and Literature at Asbury Theological Seminary (1963-1968) and a visiting professor at Seoul Theological College, Seoul, South Korea.

From 1968 to 1981, Kinlaw served his first term as President of Asbury College. He returned for a second term in that office and served from 1986-1991. In 1992, he was named Chancellor of the school.

More than an academician, Kinlaw was deeply devoted to the Wesleyan Holiness theological tradition and to the proclamation of its truth through the art of preaching. He was the founder of the Francis Asbury Society, an organization committed to the promotion of Wesleyan theology and authored several books on the topic. The Kinlaw Library on Asbury College's campus is named in honor of Kinlaw and his late wife, Elsie.

== Publication ==
=== Books ===
- Preaching in the Spirit (Francis Asbury Press, 1985)
- The Mind of Christ (Francis Asbury Press, 1998)
- We Live as Christ (Francis Asbury Press, 2001)
- This Day with the Master: 365 Daily Meditations (Francis Asbury Press, 2002; Zondervan, 2004)
- Let's Start with Jesus: A New Way of Doing Theology (Zondervan, 2005)
- La Mente De Cristo, Spanish translation of The Mind of Christ (Francis Asbury Press, 2006)

=== Chapters ===
- Kinlaw, Dennis F. (1963). "Old Testament roots of the Wesleyan message". Further insights into holiness : nineteen leading Wesleyan scholars present various phases of holiness thinking. Kansas City, MO: Beacon Hill Press.

== Notes and references ==
=== Sources ===
- Snyder, Howard A (2011). Salvation Means Creation Healed. Eugene, OR: CASCADE Books.
- Reasoner, Victor P. (2011). Why Inerrancy is Compatible with Evangelical Wesleyanism (PDF). Orangeburg, SC: Southern Methodist College.
