= Benjamin Franklin Haynes =

Benjamin Franklin Haynes (1851–1923), usually known as B. F. Haynes, was a Methodist and later Nazarene minister and theologian from Tennessee. He was associated with the Holiness movement.

He was the founding editor of the Tennessee Methodist. Later he was the founding editor of Herald of Holiness, the flagship journal of the Church of the Nazarene, now known as Holiness Today. He was also president of the Martin Methodist College in Pulaski, Tennessee from 1902 to 1905 and Asbury College in Wilmore, Kentucky from 1905 to 1908.

He wrote a book, Tempest-Tossed on Methodist Seas, about his decision to leave the Methodist Episcopal Church, South because of bitter divisions within the church over the holiness movement.
