= Anna Talbott McPherson =

American artist (1904–2003)

Anna Talbott McPherson (1904–2003) wrote more than 22 biographies of famous Christians. She is also known for her pen and ink drawings, using shadings and colorings on scripted text to appear to form portraits.

== Biography ==
Anna was born into a Quaker home in Damascus, Ohio. She attended Asbury College during the 1927–28 and 1928-29 school years. Anna graduated in 1929 with a major in Greek and Latin. While at Asbury, she published the first in what became a series of “written pictures” in 1929. She has also illustrated and authored several books. Her writings include Forgotten Saints (1961), They Dared to be Different (1967), They Dared to Overcome (1983), Praying Parents Take Heart (1975), H. Robb French—Pioneer, Prophet and Prayer Warrior, Spiritual Secrets of Famous Christians (1964), and Down a Candle Lighted Pathway, which is based on real events in her life. She taught college classes in subjects including Greek and Mathematics.

Anna married Chase Roe McPherson (1907–1987), a descendant of Forrest Samuel McPherson. Chase was a graduate of Asbury College (1930) and Asbury Theological Seminary (1933) and became a minister (Methodist, and later Wesleyan). Anna went with him and shared his duties in Iowa, Ohio, and Virginia. She and her husband had five children. They were affiliated with the Wesleyan Methodist Church where Rev. McPherson was Conference Secretary of Evangelism and General Evangelist of the Allegheny Conference. Anna died at the age of 98. In 1978, a portion of Anna's written pictures were donated to the school from among the books and papers of a former Asbury professor, H.J. Hervey. These pieces include “The Madonna and Child” (1938), “The True Shepherd” (1930), and “The Man of Sorrows” (1929). Also, a brief biography was found in the Asbury College archives entitled “Story of Anna Talbott McPherson”: “When Anna was fourteen, the well-known profile of Abraham Lincoln emerged as she looked at the copy of the Emancipation Proclamation written in fine italic script. That experience so intrigued her that she determined to try to accomplish the same effect. In the years that followed, she succeeded by using a crow-quill pen, various colored inks for italic script suitably spaced and shaded, and an infinite amount of patience. In time, three heads of presidents – Wilson, Harding, and Washington – appeared. The latter has been displayed near the entrance of the Library of Congress. Later the pictures of Christ emerged within appropriately selected Biblical passages. Copies of all her pictures are in the archives of the Library of Congress.

Anna and her husband, Chase R. McPherson, met at Asbury College in Wilmore, Kentucky, and married following his graduation in 1930. After two years in seminary for his B.D. degree, Chase began his Methodist ministry. In 1945 they settled in Damascus, Ohio, where Chase completed 50 years of service within the church. In 1986 they came to Copeland Oaks Retirement Center in Sebring, Ohio, where Chase entered Crandall Health Care unit and died the following year.

All of Anna's stories are true character sketches. Fifteen books of children's story collections have been published.
