= Kingswood, Kentucky =

Unincorporated community in Kentucky, United States

- Unincorporated community
- Location within Kentucky Location within the United States
- Coordinates: 37°43′8.4″N 86°24′32.4″W
- Country: United States
- State: Kentucky
- County: Breckinridge
- Elevation: 732 ft (223 m)
- Time zone: UTC-6 (Central (CST))
  - Summer (DST): UTC-5 (CDT)
- Zip code: 40147
- Area codes: 270 & 364
- GNIS feature ID: 495771

Kingswood, Kentucky is a town in Breckinridge County, Kentucky. It was settled in 1906 and was named in honor of Kingswood School in Great Britain, which was founded by John Wesley in 1748. Kingswood College founded by John Wesley Hughes operated in the community from 1906 to 1934. A post office was opened in 1907 and closed in 1966.
