= Original righteousness =

Original righteousness is a concept variously appraised in Roman Catholic and Reformed theology relating to the Edenic state of sinlessness. According to this doctrine, Adam and Eve were created without sin (a point that all Christian churches agree upon), and this original righteousness meant that a number of conditions that are now "natural" did not apply. Humans were, in such a state, united with their essence, and therefore their forms were, as their spirits, untainted. The Adamic man was immortal, experienced no excess of desire (in either lust or gluttony or greed), and had neither obesity nor starvation. Where Roman Catholicism believes the original moral state of humanity to have been the result of a donum superadditum, humanity having been created in a morally-neutral state with an extra grace that was rescinded at the fall, Reformed theology holds to original righteousness as facultative and an inherent personal quality of goodness obtained at creation, a donum concreatum. However, even within scholastic and Roman Catholic theology, the precise relationship between a donum superadditum and original righteousness is debated.

The concept of original righteousness shows up throughout discussions of the lost Eden in Western literature. The twentieth-century poet Gerard Manley Hopkins's poetry consistently addresses the implications of "natural" and "nature" falling with man's sin. The fall of man is, in this theological scheme, a fall of nature as well (for nature, too, was perfect and essential only in the Garden of Eden), and man's own sin causes it to contain evil. Additionally, the loss of original righteousness is important to both concepts of what the essence of man is (e.g. whether man is essentially perverse or some righteousness remains in a mitigated form), the nature of the resurrection of the dead into perfected flesh at the last judgment (e.g. whether it is a figurative or literal recasting of perfected bodies for the risen), and the nature of the forcefulness of grace (e.g. if man's soul is entirely depraved, then grace must carry more force than if man has an echo of original righteousness).

Few churches disagree with the fundamentals of the concept of original righteousness, but the exact nature of the human in a state of original righteousness is rejected or amplified by some denominations. Some of those who deny the Augustinian doctrine of the transmission of original sin hold that infants are in pure righteousness; although this view is not widespread, it has been used in discussions of infant baptism.
