= Cornelius R. Hager =

Cornelius R. Hager (2 July 1913 – 18 May 2007) was an American educator. Hager was born and raised in Jessamine County, Kentucky, where he attended Nicholasville High School. In 1934 he graduated from Asbury College. Following college, he attended Asbury Theological Seminary, receiving the bachelor of divinity degree in 1938. In 1941 he obtained a master's degree from the University of Kentucky. Hager served in the US Army during World War II.

Following the war, Hager began his career in education as school superintendent for Jessamine County, Kentucky, a post he held from 1947 to 1957. From 1957 to 1979 he served as Assistant Dean of Extended Education at the University of Kentucky. Later, he served three separate terms as interim president of Asbury College and one term as interim president of the University of Kentucky. Hager's career spanned sixty years during which he held positions with the Asbury College board of trustees, the Kentucky Education Association, the Kentucky Association of School Superintendents, and local civic organizations.

He died on 18 May 2007 at the age of 93.
