= Prayer: Conversing With God =

1959 book about prayer by Rosalind Rinker

- Author: Rosalind Rinker
- Subject: Christian prayer
- Publisher: Zondervan
- Publication date: 1959

Prayer: Conversing With God is a 1959 book about prayer by Rosalind Rinker. In 2006, it was named by Christianity Today as the most influential book with evangelicals over the last fifty years. CT noted that "Rosalind Rinker taught us something revolutionary: Prayer is a conversation with God". It went on to suggest that "today evangelicals assume that casual, colloquial, intimate prayer is the most authentic way to pray."

Dallas Willard recalls that when the book appeared, "group after group were brought to life as they learned to listen to God".
