= Holiness movement =

Beliefs and practices that emerged from 19th-century Methodism

The Holiness movement is a Christian movement that emerged chiefly within 19th-century Methodism, and to a lesser extent influenced other traditions, such as Quakerism, as well as parts of Anabaptism and Restorationism. Churches aligned with the holiness movement teach that the life of a born-again Christian should be free of sin. The movement is historically distinguished by its emphasis on the doctrine of a second work of grace, which is called entire sanctification or Christian perfection. The word Holiness refers specifically to this belief in entire sanctification as an instantaneous, definite second work of grace, in which original sin is cleansed, the heart is made perfect in love, and the believer is empowered to serve God. For the Holiness movement, "the term 'perfection' signifies completeness of Christian character; its freedom from all sin, and possession of all the graces of the Spirit, complete in kind." A number of Christian denominations, parachurch organizations, and movements emphasize those Holiness beliefs as central doctrine.

In addition to the regular holding of church services in the morning and evening of the Lord's Day, and usually having a midweek Wednesday church service, within parts of denominations or entire denominations aligned with the holiness movement, camp meetings and tent revivals are organized throughout the year—especially in the summertime. These are aimed at preaching the New Birth (first work of grace) and entire sanctification (second work of grace), along with calling backsliders to repentance. Churches in the holiness tradition emphasize a sober lifestyle, especially with regard to clean speech, modesty, and teetotalism.

== Beliefs ==
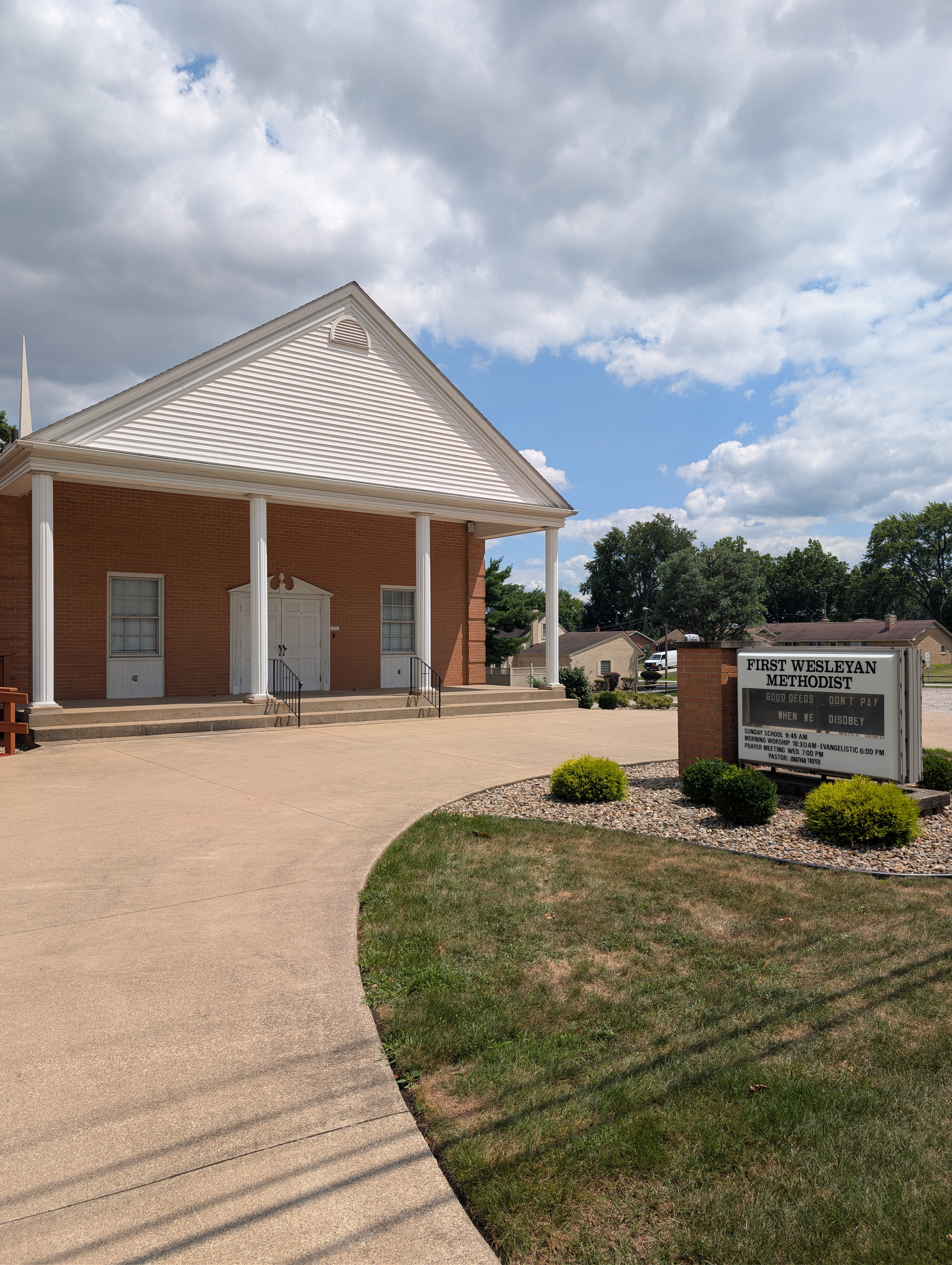
The sign of this Wesleyan Methodist church displays the times for the Sunday morning service of worship and Sunday evening service of worship, consistent with the historical First-day Sabbatarian doctrine of Methodism to keep the Lord's Day holy. The midweek Wednesday prayer service (a common Methodist observance) is indicated on the sign as well.

=== Entire sanctification ===
The Holiness movement believes that the "second work of grace" (or "second blessing") refers to a personal experience subsequent to regeneration, in which the believer is cleansed from original sin. It was actually upon this doctrine, the attainment of complete freedom from sin, that the movement was built.

"In this line of thinking, a person is first saved, at which point he is justified and born again. Following this, he experiences a period of growth...This ultimately culminates in a second work of grace whereby the Holy Spirit cleanses his heart of original sin, eradicating all inbred sin. The Holy Spirit then imparts His indwelling presence, empowering the believer...This is the baptism of the Holy Spirit. It happens instantaneously as the believer presents himself or herself as a living sacrifice to God with an attitude of full consecration," and faith.

John Wesley, who articulated the doctrine, taught that those who had been entirely sanctified would be perfect in love, engaging in works of piety and works of mercy—both of which are characteristic of a believer's growing in grace.

The 1885 Declaration of Principles of the National Camp Meeting Association for Christian Holiness explained:

"Entire Sanctification... is that great work wrought subsequent to regeneration, by the Holy Ghost, upon the sole condition of faith...such faith being preceded by an act of solemn and complete consecration. This work has these distinct elements:

1. The entire extinction of the carnal mind, the total eradication of the birth principle of sin
2. The communication of perfect love to the soul...
3. The abiding indwelling of the Holy Ghost".

The Church of the Nazarene, a large Wesleyan-Holiness denomination in the Methodist tradition, explains that:

"We believe that entire sanctification is that act of God, subsequent to regeneration, by which believers are made free from original sin, or depravity, and brought into a state of entire devotement to God, and the holy obedience of love made perfect.

It is wrought by the baptism with or infilling of the Holy Spirit, and comprehends in one experience the cleansing of the heart from sin and the abiding, indwelling presence of the Holy Spirit, empowering the believer for life and service.

Entire sanctification is provided by the blood of Jesus, is wrought instantaneously by grace through faith, preceded by entire consecration; and to this work and state of grace the Holy Spirit bears witness.

This experience is also known by various terms representing its different phases, such as "Christian perfection", "perfect love", "heart purity", "the baptism with or infilling of the Holy Spirit", "the fullness of the blessing", and "Christian holiness".

According to Stephen S. White, a noted Holiness scholar from the mid-1900s, there are "five cardinal elements" in the doctrine of entire sanctification:

1. "Entire Sanctification is a Second work of Grace.
2. Entire Sanctification is received Instantaneously.
3. Entire Sanctification -- Frees from Sin.
4. Entire Sanctification -- Is Attainable in This Life.
5. Entire Sanctification -- and the Baptism with the Holy Spirit are Simultaneous"

This experience of entire sanctification or Perfection is generally identified with the filling of or the baptism of the Holy Ghost, the term used by Methodism's systematic theologian John William Fletcher. As such, entire sanctification is also known in the Methodist tradition as Baptism with the Holy Spirit. Fletcher emphasized that the experience of entire sanctification, through the indwelling of the Holy Spirit, cleanses the believer of original sin and empowers the believer for service to God. John Swanel Inskip, a minister in the Methodist Episcopal Church, explained, "There is, however, one doctrine, in a great measure peculiar to Methodism. It is that, in which we teach the possibility of man attaining a state of grace in the present life, in which he will be made free from sin."

Reflecting this inward holiness, denominations aligned with the holiness movement have emphasized modesty and sobriety. However, the terminology used to define this varies with the tradition (e.g., Methodist versus Quaker versus Anabaptist). Holiness Methodists, who make up the bulk of the Holiness Movement, have emphasized the Wesleyan-Arminian doctrine outward holiness, which includes practices such as the wearing of modest clothing and not using profanity in speech. Holiness Quakers have emphasized the Friends teaching on testimony of simplicity. Holiness Anabaptists, such as Holiness River Brethren and Holiness Mennonites, have upheld their belief in nonconformity to the world.

=== Definition of sin ===
Holiness adherents also hold to a distinctive definition of (actual) sin. They believe that "only conscious sins are truly sins." Historian Charles Jones explained, "Believing that sin was conscious disobedience to a known law of God, holiness believers were convinced that the true Christian, having repented of every known act of sin, did not and could not willfully sin again and remain a Christian." Historian Benjamin Pettit described the approach of the Wesleyan-Holiness movement as:

1. "The person who sins is not a Christian but a sinner.

2. When a person is saved, he is out of the sin business (may but must not sin).

3. The sinner must repent and be restored to his lost relationship with God.

4. To sin results in spiritual death."

In his study of this question, Caleb Black concluded that "the consensus understanding of sin in the Holiness tradition is that sin is an avoidable, voluntary, morally responsible act that those born of God do not commit." Put simply, Holiness adherents adhere to the definition of sin, as explained by Wesley himself:

"Nothing is sin, strictly speaking, but a voluntary transgression of a known law of God. Therefore, every voluntary breach of the law of love is sin; and nothing else, if we speak properly. To strain the matter farther is only to make way for Calvinism."

Dr. Timothy Cooley explained, "If this definition is compromised, victorious Christian living becomes meaningless, and entire sanctification an impossibility." "The definition and consequences of sin are a key theological distinctive of the Holiness Movement as it underlies their entire theological system. To differ on the conception of sin is to destroy the foundation of holiness theology."

With this definition of sin, Holiness adherents believe that while Christians may fall into sin, they also have the God-given power to avoid sin and, in this sense, be free from sin. Furthermore, not only does God enable this obedience, but he also requires it. One of the movement's founders, J. A. Wood, explains, "The lowest type of a Christian sinneth not, and is not condemned. The minimum of salvation is salvation from sinning. The maximum is salvation from pollution—the inclination to sin." Another founder, C. J. Fowler, explains that "We teach that regeneration does not allow the committing of conscious sin."

Harry Jessop warns, "It should ever be born in mind that believers cannot commit sin without forfeiting justification." The founder of the Church of God (Anderson, Indiana), D. S. Warner, explains, "Holiness writers and teachers, as far as my knowledge extends, uniformly hold up a sinless life, as the true test and Bible standard of regeneration." This doctrine follows in the footsteps of Wesley, who wrote, "If a believer wilfully sins, he casts away his faith. Neither is it possible he should have justifying faith again, without previously repenting."

=== Lifestyle ===
Denominations aligned with the Holiness movement believe the moral aspects of the law of God are pertinent for today, and adherents obey teachings regarding modesty, clean speech, and sober living. Consequently, members of the Holiness movement readily apply Scriptural lifestyle commands to their lives and view them as generally binding today, and apply these principles in numerous different ways. "Holiness churches have been distinguished from other churches by their more careful lifestyle. Many churches and denominations in the Holiness movement prohibit smoking, drinking, dancing, listening to inappropriate worldly music, or wearing makeup or flashy clothes."

=== Diversity in belief and practice ===
Christian denominations aligned with the holiness movement all share a belief in the doctrine of Christian perfection (entire sanctification). Apart from this, denominations identified with the holiness movement differ on several issues, given that Methodist, Quaker, Anabaptist, and Restorationist churches comprise the holiness movement, and these denominations have unique doctrines and theologies. Methodist denominations that are a part of the holiness movement, such as the Free Methodist Church or Missionary Methodist Church, affirm the celebration of the sacraments, chiefly Holy Baptism and Holy Communion. Denominations of the Quaker tradition, such as the Central Yearly Meeting of Friends, are entirely non-sacramental.

Anabaptist denominations aligned with the holiness movement, such as the Apostolic Christian Church, teach the observance of ordinances, such as communion, headcovering and footwashing. While the Methodist denominations of the holiness movement hold to church membership, such as the Lumber River Conference of the Holiness Methodist Church, the concept of membership rolls is rejected in holiness denominations of a Restorationist background, such as the Church of God (Anderson, Indiana).

== History ==
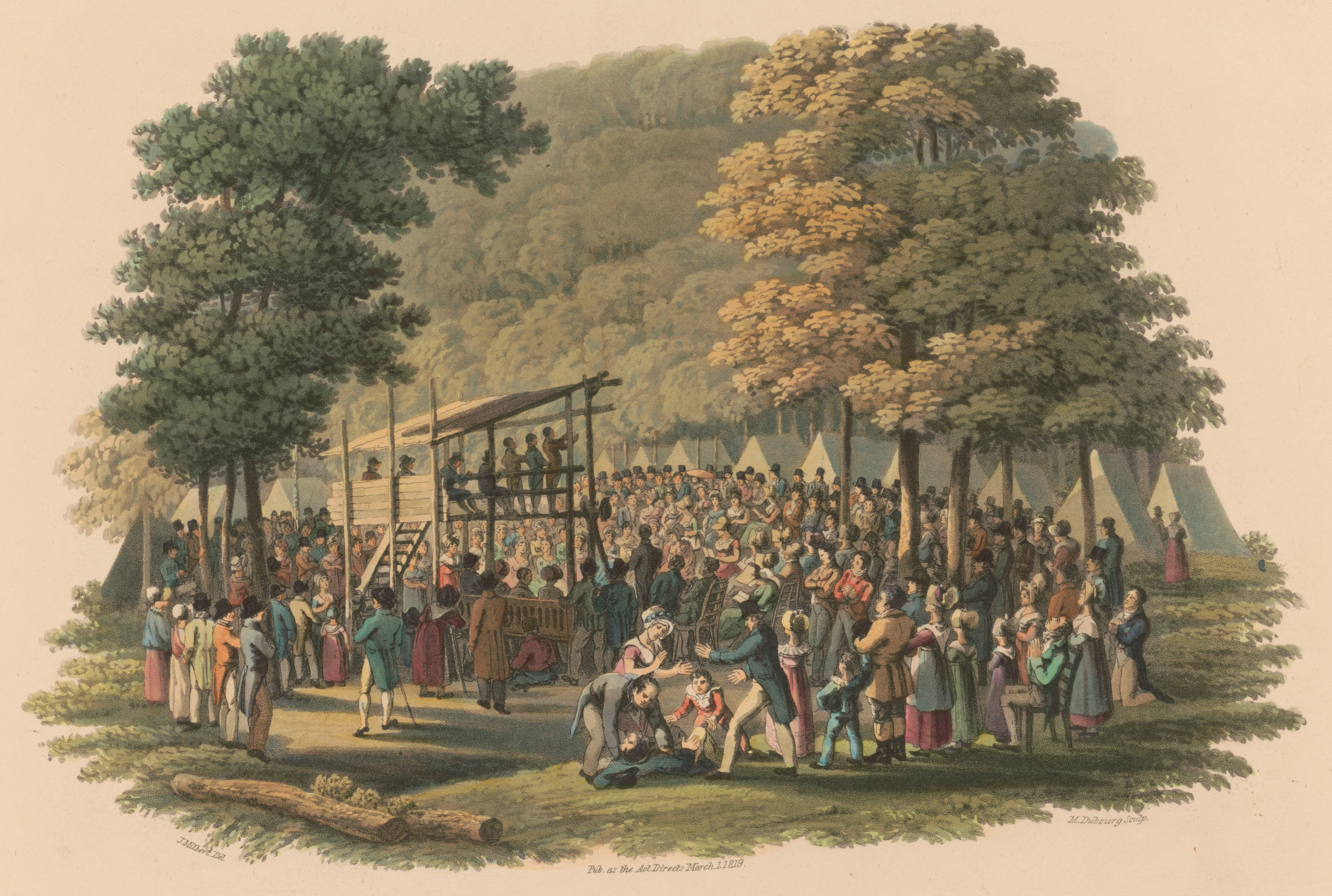
An engraving of a Methodist camp meeting in 1819. Library of Congress.

=== Roots ===
Though it became a multi-denominational movement over time and was furthered by the Second Great Awakening which energized churches of all stripes, the bulk of Holiness movement has its roots in John Wesley and Methodism.

=== Early Methodism ===
The Holiness movement traces their roots back to John Wesley, Charles Wesley, John Fletcher, and the Methodists of the 18th century. The Methodists of the 19th century continued the interest in Christian holiness that had been started by their founder, John Wesley in England. They continued to publish Wesley's works and tracts, including his famous A Plain Account of Christian Perfection. From 1788 to 1808, the entire text of A Plain Account was placed in the Discipline manual of the Methodist Episcopal Church (U.S.), and numerous persons in early American Methodism professed the experience of entire sanctification, including Bishop Francis Asbury. The Methodists during this period placed a strong emphasis on holy living, and their concept of entire sanctification.

=== Second Great Awakening ===
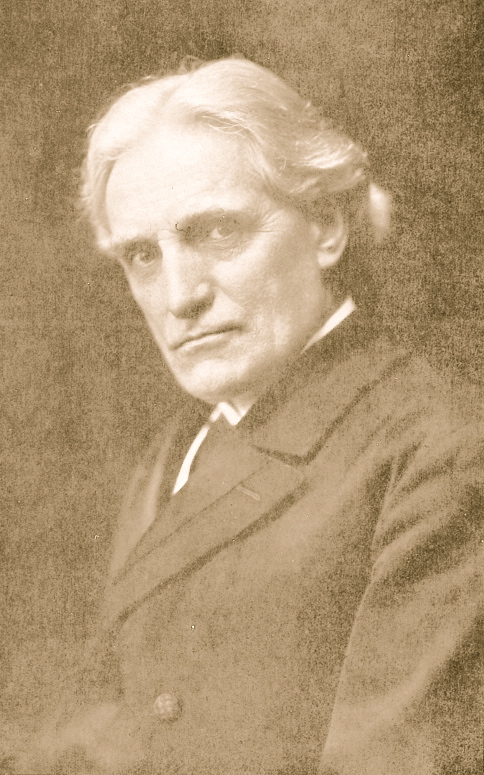
Henry Clay Morrison, a Methodist evangelist and founder of Asbury Theological Seminary

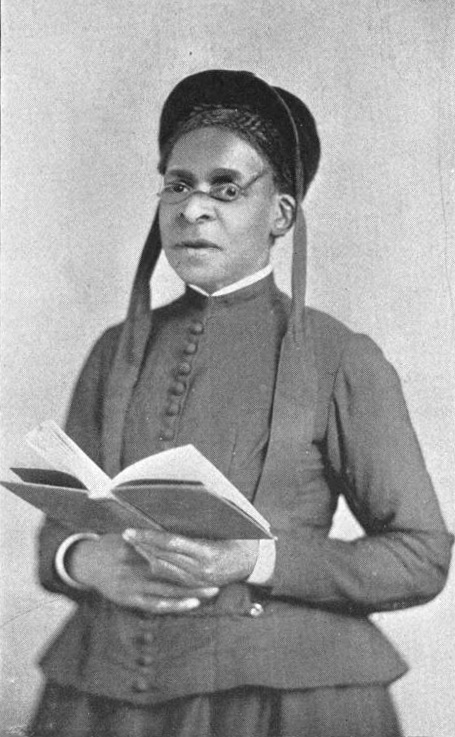
Julia A. J. Foote, an elder in the African Methodist Episcopal Zion Church, preached Christian holiness in the pulpits of her connection. Her autobiography has the theme of entire sanctification interwoven in it and concludes with "How to Obtain Sanctification".

By the 1840s, a new emphasis on Holiness and Christian perfection began within American Methodism, brought about in large part by the revivalism and camp meetings of the Second Great Awakening (1790–1840).

Two major Holiness leaders during this period were Methodist preacher Phoebe Palmer and her husband, Dr. Walter Palmer. In 1835, Palmer's sister, Sarah A. Lankford, started holding Tuesday Meetings for the Promotion of Holiness in her New York City home. In 1837, Palmer experienced what she called entire sanctification and had become the leader of the Tuesday Meetings by 1839. At first only women attended these meetings, but eventually Methodist bishops and hundreds of clergy and laymen began to attend as well. At the same time, Methodist minister Timothy Merritt of Boston founded a journal called the Guide to Christian Perfection, later renamed The Guide to Holiness. This was the first American periodical dedicated exclusively to promoting the doctrine of Christian holiness. In 1865, the Palmers purchased The Guide which at its peak had a circulation of 30,000. In New York City, Palmer met with Amanda Smith, a preacher in the African Methodist Episcopal Church who testified that she became entirely sanctified in 1868 and then began to preach Christian holiness throughout the world.

Also representative was the revivalism of Rev. James Caughey, an American missionary sent by the Wesleyan Methodist Church to work in Ontario, Canada from the 1840s through 1864. He brought in the converts by the score, most notably in the revivals in Canada West 1851–53. His technique combined restrained emotionalism with a clear call for personal commitment, thus bridging the rural style of camp meetings and the expectations of more "sophisticated" Methodist congregations in the emerging cities. Phoebe Palmer's ministry complemented Caughey's revivals in Ontario circa 1857. Jarena Lee of the African Methodist Episcopal Church and Julia A. J. Foote of the African Methodist Episcopal Zion Church aligned themselves with the Wesleyan-Holiness movement and preached the doctrine of entire sanctification throughout the pulpits of their connexions.

While many holiness proponents stayed in the mainline Methodist Churches, such as Henry Clay Morrison who became president of Asbury College and Theological Seminary, at least two major Holiness Methodist denominations broke away from mainline Methodism during this period. In 1843, Orange Scott organized the Wesleyan Methodist Connection (an antecedent of the Wesleyan Church, as well as the Allegheny Wesleyan Methodist Connection and the Bible Methodist Connection of Churches) at Utica, New York. The major reason for the foundation of the Wesleyan Methodist Church was their emphasis on the abolition of slavery.

Similar beliefs were publicized in John H. Noyes's 1848 book Bible Communism.

In 1860, B.T. Roberts and John Wesley Redfield founded the Free Methodist Church on the ideals of slavery abolition, egalitarianism, and second-blessing holiness. In 1900, the Lumber River Conference of the Holiness Methodist Church was organized to minister to Native Americans, especially the Lumbee tribe. Advocacy for the poor remained a hallmark of these and other Methodist offshoots. Some of these offshoots would currently be more specifically identified as part of the Conservative holiness movement, a group that would represent the more conservative branch of the movement.

At the Tuesday Meetings, Methodists soon enjoyed fellowship with Christians of different denominations, including the Congregationalist Thomas Upham. Upham was the first man to attend the meetings, and his participation in them led him to study mystical experiences, looking to find precursors of Holiness teaching in the writings of persons like German Pietist Johann Arndt and the Roman Catholic mystic Madame Guyon.

Baptists who have embraced the second work of grace have founded their own denominations, such as the Ohio Valley Association of the Christian Baptist Churches of God. The Original Church of God and the Church of Christ (Holiness) U.S.A. were founded by Baptist ministers, including Charles W. Gray and Charles Price Jones, who embraced the doctrine of entire sanctification.

Other non-Methodists also contributed to the Holiness movement in the U.S. and in England. "New School" Calvinists such as Asa Mahan, the first president of Oberlin College, and Charles Grandison Finney, an evangelist associated with the college and later its second president, promoted the idea of Christian holiness and slavery abolition, which Wesleyan Methodists also supported. In 1836, Mahan experienced what he called a baptism with the Holy Spirit. Mahan believed that this experience had cleansed him from the desire and inclination to sin. Finney believed that this experience might provide a solution to a problem he observed during his evangelistic revivals. Some people claimed to experience conversion but then slipped back into their old ways of living. Finney believed that the filling with the Holy Spirit could help these converts to continue steadfast in their Christian life. This phase of the Holiness movement is often referred to as the Oberlin-Holiness revival.

Presbyterian William Boardman promoted the idea of Holiness through his evangelistic campaigns and through his book The Higher Christian Life, which was published in 1858, which was a zenith point in Holiness activity prior to a lull brought on by the American Civil War.

Many adherents of the Religious Society of Friends (Quakers) stressed George Fox's doctrine of Perfectionism (which is analogous to the Methodist doctrine of entire sanctification). These Holiness Quakers formed Yearly Meetings such as the Central Yearly Meeting of Friends. Around the same period, Hannah Whitall Smith, an English Quaker, experienced a profound personal conversion. Sometime in the 1860s, she found what she called the "secret" of the Christian life—devoting one's life wholly to God and God's simultaneous transformation of one's soul. Her husband, Robert Pearsall Smith, had a similar experience at the camp meeting in 1867. The couple became figureheads in the now-famous Keswick Convention that gave rise to what is often called the Keswick-Holiness revival, which became distinct from the holiness movement.

Among Anabaptists, the Brethren in Christ Church (as well as the Calvary Holiness Church that later split from it) emerged in Lancaster County as a denomination of River Brethren who adopted Radical Pietistic teaching, which "emphasized spiritual passion and a warm, personal relationship to Jesus Christ." They teach "the necessity of a crisis-conversion experience" as well as the existence of a second work of grace that "results in the believer resulting in the ability to say no to sin". These Holiness Anabaptist denominations emphasize the wearing of a headcovering by women, plain dress, temperance, footwashing, and pacifism. Founded by Samuel Heinrich Fröhlich, the Apostolic Christian Church (Nazarene) is an Anabaptist denomination aligned with the holiness movement, thus being "distinguished by its emphasis on entire sanctifiation". Mennonites who were impacted by Radical Pietism and the teaching of holiness founded the Missionary Church, a holiness church in the Anabaptist tradition. (Note: The intense piety and disciplined Christian lives of the holiness advocates had a special affinity with the Anabaptist and Quakers of the nineteenth century, especially those groups that felt the influence of revivalism. Holiness revivalism had great impact on certain yearly meetings of Quakers (especially in Ohio, Kansas, the Rocky Mountains, and the Pacific Northwest). These Holiness Quakers have recently come together in the Evangelical Friends Alliance and many of them have found identity in the broader Holiness movement. Similarly the Mennonites and "Dunkers" felt the influence of the Holiness revival, especially among the various antecedents of the present Missionary Church and the Brethren in Christ with their roots among the "Dunkers".(Winn 2007, p. 114))

General Baptists who embraced belief in the second work of grace established their own denominations, such as the Holiness Baptist Association (founded in 1894) and the Ohio Valley Association of the Christian Baptist Churches of God (formed in 1931).

=== Post–Civil War ===
Following the American Civil War, many Holiness proponents—most of them Methodists—became nostalgic for the heyday of camp meeting revivalism during the Second Great Awakening.

The first distinct "Holiness camp meeting" convened at Vineland, New Jersey in 1867 under the leadership of John Swanel Inskip, John A. Wood, Alfred Cookman, and other Methodist ministers. The gathering attracted as many as 10,000 people. At the close of the encampment, while the ministers were on their knees in prayer, they formed the National Camp Meeting Association for the Promotion of Holiness, and agreed to conduct a similar gathering the next year. This organization was commonly known as the National Holiness Association. Later, it became known as the Christian Holiness Association and subsequently the Christian Holiness Partnership.

The second National Camp Meeting was held at Manheim, Pennsylvania, and drew upwards of 25,000 persons from all over the nation. People called it a "Pentecost". The service on Monday evening has almost become legendary for its spiritual power and influence. The third National Camp Meeting met at Round Lake, New York. This time the national press attended and write-ups appeared in numerous papers, including a large two-page pictorial in Harper's Weekly. These meetings made instant religious celebrities out of many of the workers. "By the 1880s holiness was the most powerful doctrinal movement in America and seemed to be carrying away all opposition both within the Methodist Church and was quickly spreading throughout many other denominations." This was not without objection. "The leaders of the National Camp Meeting Association for the Promotion of Holiness generally opposed 'come-outism,'...They urged believers in entire sanctification and Christian perfection to remain in their denominations and to work within them to promote holiness teaching and general spiritual vitality."

Though distinct from the mainstream Holiness movement, the fervor of the Keswick-Holiness revival in the 1870s swept Great Britain, where it was sometimes called the higher life movement after the title of William Boardman's book The Higher Life. Higher life conferences were held at Broadlands and Oxford in 1874 and in Brighton and Keswick in 1875. The Keswick Convention soon became the British headquarters for this movement. The Faith Mission in Scotland was another consequence of the British Holiness movement. Another was a flow of influence from Britain back to the United States: In 1874, Albert Benjamin Simpson read Boardman's Higher Christian Life and felt the need for such a life himself. Simpson went on to found the Christian and Missionary Alliance.

American Holiness associations began to form as an outgrowth of this new wave of camp meetings, such as the Western Holiness Association—first of the regional associations that prefigured "come-outism"—formed at Bloomington, Illinois. In 1877, several "general holiness conventions" met in Cincinnati and New York City.

In 1871, the American evangelist Dwight L. Moody had what he called an "endowment with power" as a result of some soul-searching and the prayers of two Free Methodist women who attended one of his meetings. He did not join the Wesleyan-Holiness movement but maintained a belief in progressive sanctification which his theological descendants still hold to.

While the great majority of Holiness proponents remained within the three major denominations of the mainline Methodist church, Holiness people from other theological traditions established standalone bodies. In 1881, D. S. Warner started the Evening Light Reformation, out of which was formed the Church of God (Anderson, Indiana), bringing Restorationism to the Holiness family. The Church of God Reformation Movement held that "interracial worship was a sign of the true Church", with both whites and blacks ministering regularly in Church of God congregations, which invited people of all races to worship there. Those who were entirely sanctified testified that they were "saved, sanctified, and prejudice removed." Though outsiders would sometimes attack Church of God services and camp meetings for their stand for racial equality, Church of God members were "undeterred even by violence" and "maintained their strong interracial position as the core of their message of the unity of all believers".

In the 1890s, Edwin Harvey and Marmaduke Mendenhall Farson started the Metropolitan Methodist Mission which became known as the Metropolitan Church Association; it taught communal living, holding that "material possessions could be idols that might threaten one's sanctification experience" and that "while people who do not have the Holy Spirit may give, those who do give all."

Palmer's The Promise of the Father, published in 1859, which argued in favor of women in ministry, later influenced Catherine Booth, co-founder of the Salvation Army. The practice of ministry by women is common but not universal within the denominations of the Holiness movement. The founding of the Salvation Army in 1878 helped to rekindle Holiness sentiment in the cradle of Methodism—a fire kept lit by Primitive Methodists and other British descendants of Wesley and George Whitefield in prior decades.

Overseas missions emerged as a central focus of the Holiness people. As one example of this world evangelism thrust, Pilgrim Holiness Church founder Martin Wells Knapp, who also founded the Revivalist in 1883, the Pentecostal Revival League and Prayer League, the Central Holiness League 1893, the International Holiness Union and Prayer League, and God's Bible School and College, saw much success in Korea, Japan, China, India, South Africa and South America. Methodist mission work in Japan led to the creation of the One Mission Society, one of the largest missionary-sending Holiness agencies in the world. Another such missionary organization, World Gospel Mission, originated out of the Missionary Department of the National Association for the Promotion of Holiness, continuing to receive support from Free Methodist, Global Methodist, Nazarene and Wesleyan congregations.

=== Wesleyan realignment ===
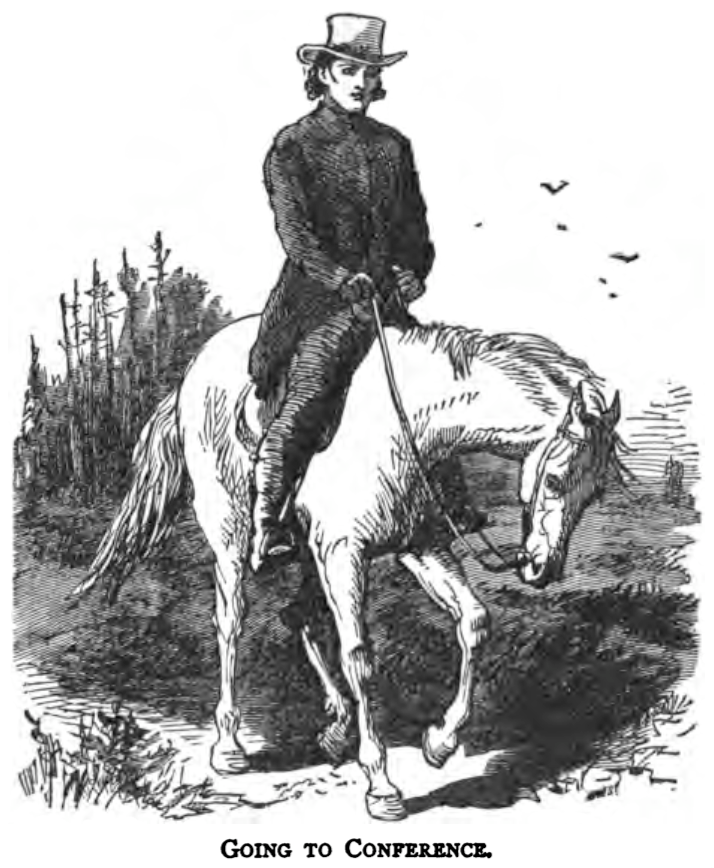
An illustration from The Circuit Rider: A Tale of the Heroic Age by Edward Eggleston depicting a Methodist circuit rider on horseback, 1906

Though many Holiness preachers, camp meeting leaders, authors, and periodical editors were Methodists, this was not universally popular with Methodist leadership. Out of the four million Methodists in the United States during the 1890s, probably one-third to one-half were committed to the idea of entire sanctification as being brought about instantaneously.

An opponent of the Holiness movement within Methodism named Daniel Whedon, a newsletter editor, claimed that "they are not Wesleyan. We believe that a living Wesley would never admit them to the Methodist system." Methodist proponents of the Holiness Movement fiercely resisted this accusation, and defended their doctrine from Wesley's own words. One of the founders of the camp meeting association, J. A. Wood, defended his doctrine with an extensive survey of Wesley's doctrine of Christian Perfection, entitled Christian Perfection as Taught by John Wesley. In this book, he spent several hundred pages exclusively quoting Wesley in defense of the Holiness Movement's view of entire sanctification.

The Holiness Movement was able to defend its doctrine so well that historian Melvin Dieter comments that "The holiness movement was 'so closely identified with traditional Methodism and Wesleyan doctrine and life that Methodist opponents of the revival were forced to distance themselves from Wesley and the standard authors of prevailing Methodist theology to re-solve the struggle with the holiness elements within the church.'" Even still "The leaders of the National Camp Meeting Association for the Promotion of Holiness generally opposed "come-outism",...They urged believers in entire sanctification and Christian perfection to remain in their denominations and to work within them to promote holiness teaching and general spiritual vitality."

Southern Methodist minister B. F. Haynes wrote in his book, Tempest-Tossed on Methodist Seas, about his decision to leave the Methodist church and join what would become Church of the Nazarene. In it, he described the bitter divisions within the Methodist church over the Holiness movement, including verbal assaults made on Holiness movement proponents at the 1894 conference. This tension reached a head at the 1898 conference of the Methodist Episcopal Church, South, when it passed rule 301:

Any traveling or local preacher, or layman, who shall hold public religious services within the bounds of any mission, circuit, or station, when requested by the preacher in charge not to hold such services, shall be deemed guilty of imprudent conduct, and shall be dealt with as the law provides in such cases.

Many Holiness evangelists and traveling ministers found it difficult to continue their ministry under this new rule—particularly in mainline Methodist charges and circuits that were unfriendly to the Holiness movement. In the years that followed, scores of new Holiness Methodist associations were formed—many of these "come-outer" associations and various parties alienated by certain parts of Mainline Methodism consolidated to form new denominations (e.g., the Free Methodist Church, the Wesleyan Methodist Church, the Salvation Army and the Church of the Nazarene).

Other Holiness Methodists (the "stay-inners") remained within the mainline Methodist Churches, such as H. C. Morrison who became the first president of Asbury Theological Seminary, a prominent university of the holiness movement that remains influential among holiness adherents in Methodism.

Those who left mainline Methodist churches to form Holiness denominations during this time numbered no more than 100,000.

=== Early 20th century ===
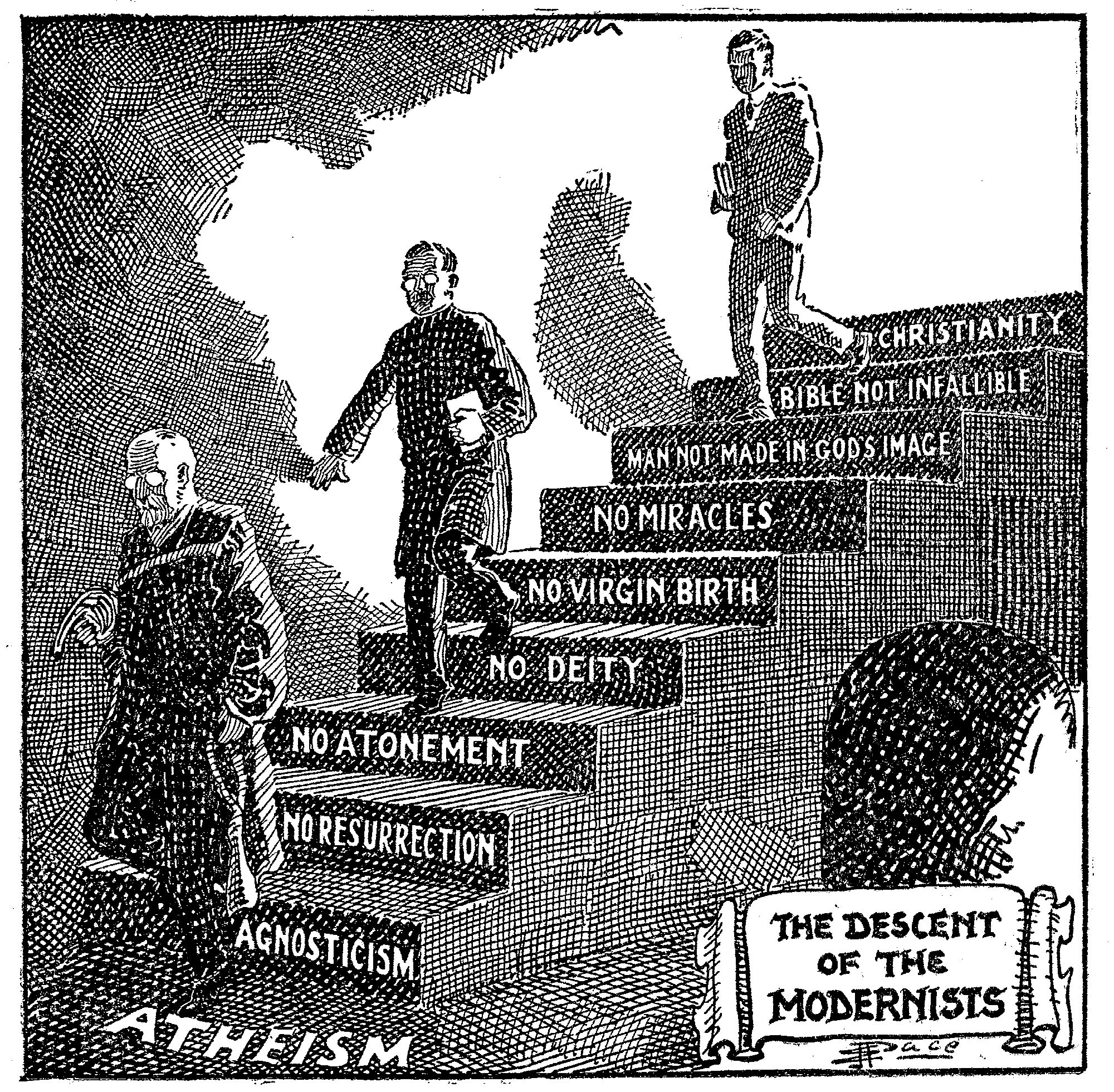
A Fundamentalist cartoon by E. J. Pace portraying Modernism as the descent from Christianity to atheism, first published in 1922 and then used in Seven Questions in Dispute by William Jennings Bryan

Throughout the early 20th century, week-long revival campaigns with local churches, and revival elements brought into the worship service, carried on the tradition of camp meetings.

Pentecostalism and the Charismatic movement competed for the loyalties of Holiness advocates (see related section below), and a separate Holiness Pentecostal movement was born that taught three works of grace: (1) New Birth, (2) entire sanctification, (3) speaking in tongues. This new dichotomy gradually dwindled the population of the mainstream of the Holiness movement.

Some Holiness advocates found themselves at home with Fundamentalism and later the Evangelical movement. It was during this time (1939) that the Methodist Episcopal Church (North and South) and the Methodist Protestant Church merged to form The Methodist Church. This merger created a Mainline Christian organization which made remaining Holiness elements within U.S. Methodism less influential.

=== Mid-to-late 20th century ===
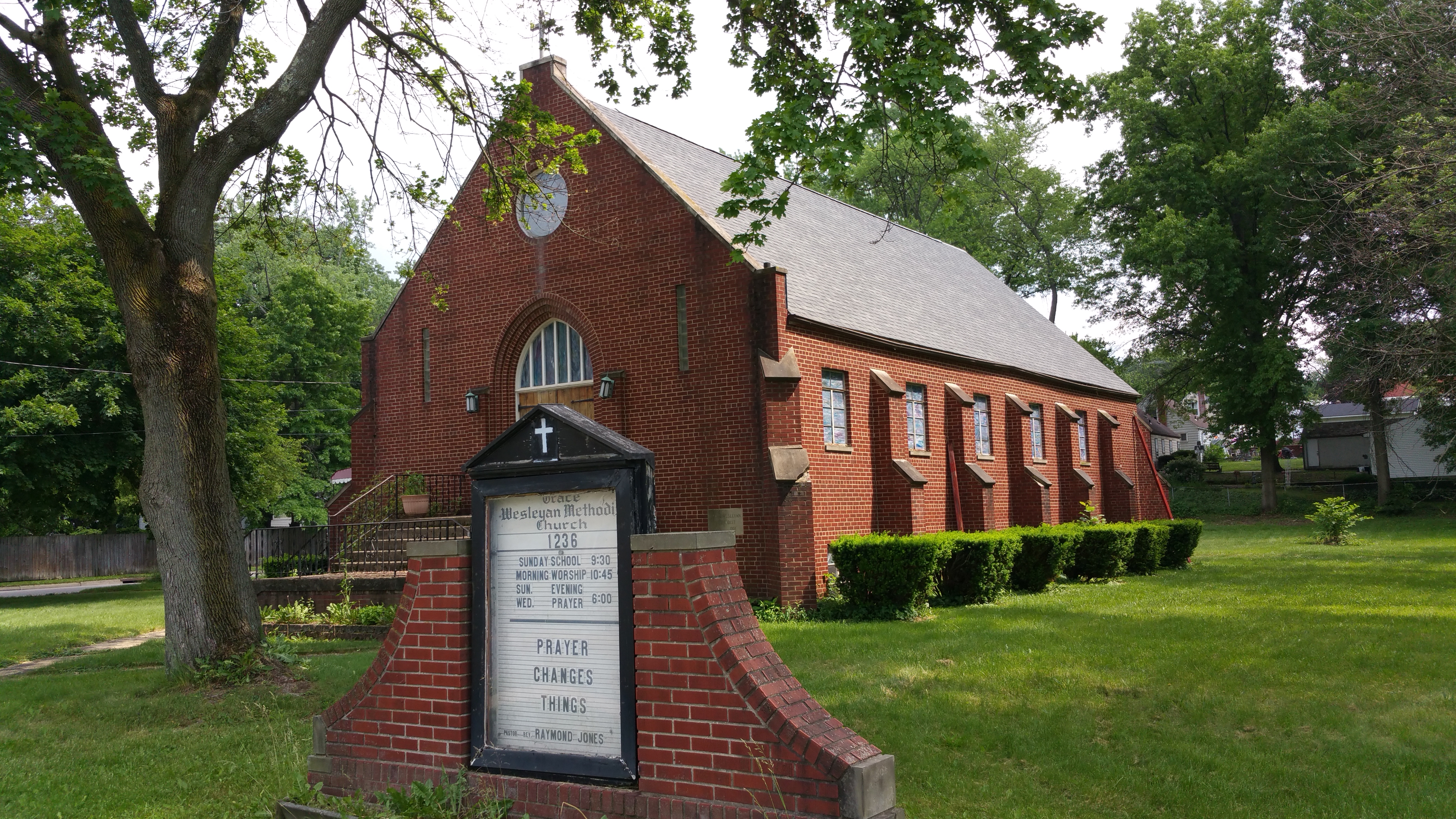
Grace Wesleyan Methodist Church is a parish church of the Allegheny Wesleyan Methodist Connection, one of the largest denominations in the conservative holiness movement, and is located in Akron, Ohio.

Cultural shifts following World War II resulted in a further division in the Holiness movement.

Not content with what they considered to be a lax attitude toward sin, several small groups left Holiness denominations of the Methodist tradition, and to a lesser extent Quaker, Anabaptist and Restorationist denominations, to form the conservative holiness movement. Staunch defenders of Biblical inerrancy, they stress modesty in dress and revivalistic worship practices. They identify with classical Fundamentalism more so than Evangelicalism. While some have pointed out that the broader holiness movement has declined in its original strong emphasis of the doctrine of entire sanctification, the conservative holiness movement still frequently promotes, preaches, and teaches this definition of holiness and entire sanctification, both at the scholarly level, and in pastoral teaching.

As the Holiness Conservatives were distancing themselves even further, Mainline Methodism was becoming larger with the merger between The Methodist Church and the Evangelical United Brethren Church, forming the United Methodist Church in 1968. A slow trickle of disaffected Holiness-friendly United Methodists left for Holiness movement denominations. Other Holiness advocates stayed in the United Methodist Church and are represented in the Good News Movement and Confessing Movement. These movements eventually led to the creation of the Global Methodist Church. Many United Methodist clergy, and now Global Methodist clergy, in the holiness tradition are educated at Asbury Theological Seminary.

Meanwhile, the bulk of the Wesleyan-Holiness churches began to developed a disdain for what they considered to be legalism, and gradually dropped prohibitions against dancing and theater patronage, while maintaining rules against gambling, as well as alcohol and tobacco use. Continued stances on the sanctity of marriage and abstinence matched similar convictions. In the 1970s, opposition to abortion became a recurring theme, and by the 1990s statements against practicing homosexuality were increasingly common. A devotion to charity work continued, particularly through the Salvation Army and other denominational and parachurch agencies.

=== 21st century ===
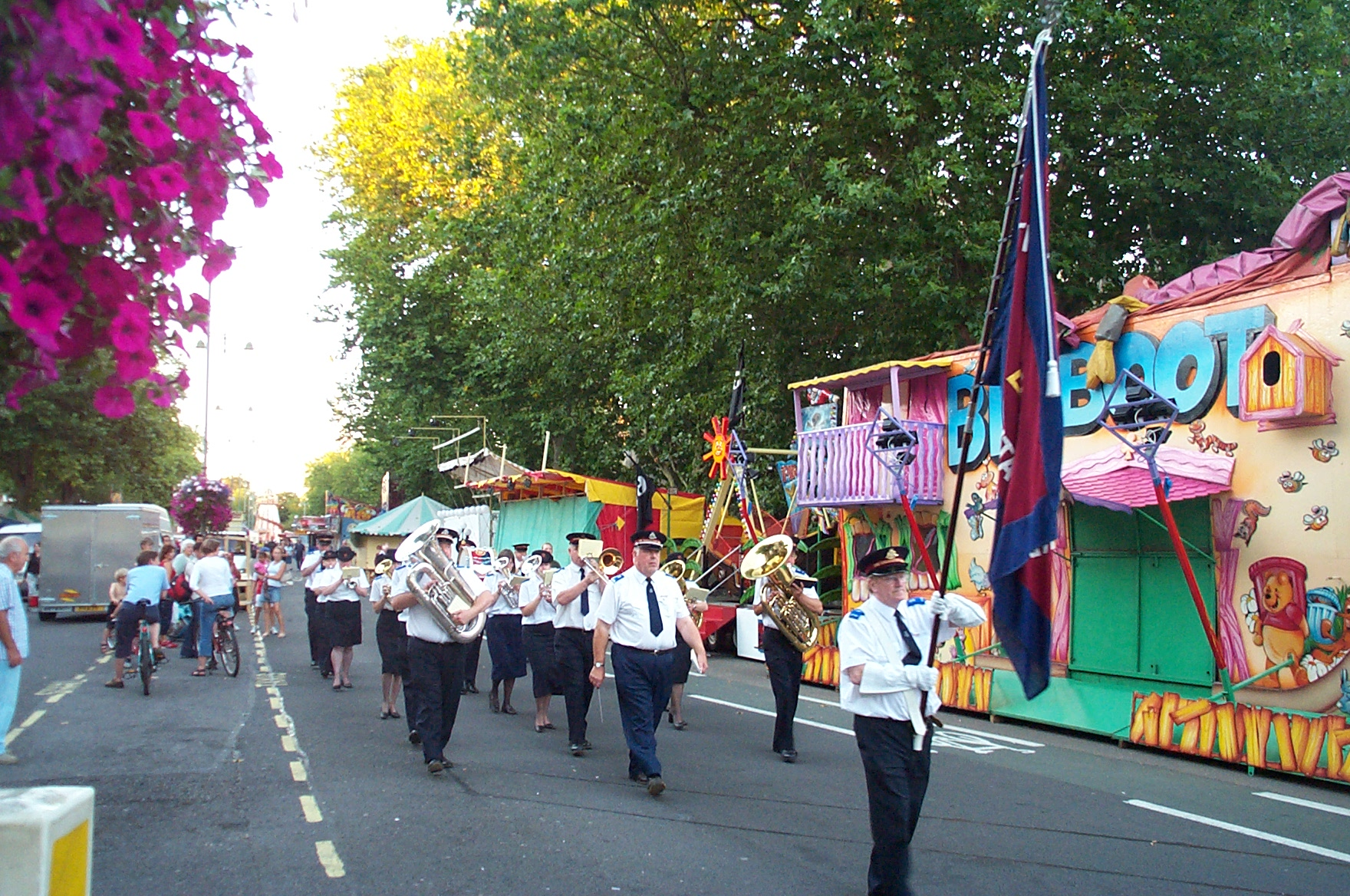
A Salvation Army band parade in Oxford, United Kingdom

Faced with a growing identity crisis and continually dwindling numbers, Wesleyan-Holiness Evangelicals have hosted several inter-denominational conferences and begun several initiatives to draw a clearer distinction between Wesleyan theology and that of other Evangelicals and to explore how to address contemporary social issues and appear winsome to a "post-modern world". As one such example, in 2006 the Wesleyan Holiness Consortium published "The Holiness Manifesto" in conjunction with representatives from historic Holiness Methodist denominations, including the Free Methodist Church, United Methodist Church, Wesleyan Church, and the Church of the Nazarene.

The divide between classical Fundamentalism and Evangelicalism became greater following the 9/11 terrorist attacks on the U.S. by militant Muslim fundamentalists—as the term "fundamental" became associated with intolerance and aggressive attitudes. Several Evangelical Holiness groups and publications have denounced the term "fundamentalist" (preferring Evangelical) while others are reconciling to what extent the Fundamentalist movement of the 1920s remains a part of their history.

The Church of the Nazarene, the Wesleyan Church, and the Free Methodist Church were the largest Wesleyan-Evangelical Holiness bodies as of 2015. Talks of a merger were tabled, but new cooperatives such as the Global Wesleyan Alliance were formed as the result of inter-denominational meetings.

The Global Methodist Church consists of a large number of traditionalists, including those aligned with the Wesleyan-Holiness movement. The Book of Discipline of the Global Methodist Church thus teaches that "a life of holiness or 'entire sanctification' should be the goal of each individual's journey with God." After its establishment, Asbury Theological Seminary, a flagship institution of the Wesleyan-Holiness movement, signed a church planting partnership with the Global Methodist Church.

At this point the legacy of the Holiness Movement is fragmented between the more conservative branch (cf. conservative holiness movement), attempting to maintain and revive historic Holiness doctrine and practice, and others more willing to move beyond the doctrine and tradition of the past.

== Influences ==
The main roots of the Holiness movement are as follows:

- The Reformation itself, with its emphasis on salvation by grace through faith alone.
- Puritanism in 17th-century England and its transplantation to America, with its emphasis on adherence to the Bible and the right to dissent from the established church.
- Pietistic Lutheranism in 17th-century Germany, led by Philipp Jakob Spener, as well as the Moravian Church, both of which emphasized the spiritual life of the individual, coupled with a responsibility to live an upright life.
- Quietism, as taught by the Religious Society of Friends (Quakers), with its emphasis on the individual's ability to experience God and understand God's will for himself.
- The teaching of Christian perfection by the founder of Quaker Christianity, George Fox.
- The 1730s Evangelical Revival in England, led by Methodists John Wesley and his brother Charles Wesley, which introduced the concept of Entire Sanctification and certain teachings of Moravianism to England and eventually to the United States.
- The First Great Awakening in the 18th and early 19th centuries in the United States, propagated by George Whitefield, Jonathan Edwards, and others, with its emphasis on the initial conversion experience of Christians.
- The Second Great Awakening in the 19th century in the United States, propagated by Francis Asbury, Charles Finney, Lyman Beecher, Phoebe Palmer and others, which also emphasized the need for personal holiness, and is characterized by the rise of evangelistic revival meetings.

== Relation and reaction to Pentecostalism ==
The traditional Holiness movement is distinct from the Holiness Pentecostal movement, the latter of which believes that the baptism in the Holy Spirit is a third work of grace of empowerment that involves supernatural manifestations such as speaking in unknown tongues. On the other hand, the holiness movement views entire sanctification and baptism with the Holy Spirit synonymously, being the second work of grace that empowers the believer to serve God with an undivided heart.

Many of the early Pentecostals (known as Holiness Pentecostals) originated from the Holiness movement, and to this day Holiness Pentecostals maintain the belief in a first work of grace (New Birth) and second work of grace (entire sanctification). However, Holiness Pentecostals teach a third work of grace, being empowered with the manifestation of speaking in tongues. This concept of a third work of grace is rejected by the holiness movement. Several of the Holiness Pentecostal denominations include the word "Holiness" in their names, including the Calvary Holiness Association and Pentecostal Holiness Church, among others.

The terms pentecostal and apostolic, now used by adherents to Pentecostal and charismatic doctrine, were once widely used by Holiness churches in connection with the consecrated lifestyle they see described in the New Testament. Denomnations of the holiness movement, however, started to use these terms less as Holiness Pentecostal churches used them more, e.g. the Apostolic Faith Church.

During the Azusa Street Revival, often considered the advent of Pentecostalism, the practice of speaking in tongues was strongly rejected by leaders of the traditional Holiness movement. Alma White, the leader of the Pillar of Fire Church, a Holiness Methodist denomination, wrote a book against the Pentecostal movement that was published in 1936. The work, entitled Demons and Tongues, represented early rejection of the tongues-speaking Pentecostal movement. White called speaking in tongues "satanic gibberish" and Pentecostal services "the climax of demon worship". However, some contemporary Holiness churches (such as those networking with Aldersgate Renewal Ministries) now believe in the legitimacy of speaking in unknown tongues, but not as a sign of baptism with the Holy Spirit as Holiness Pentecostals teach. Others, such as the Pilgrim Holiness Church, maintain the historic rejection of speaking in tongues.

There are an estimated 78 million classical Pentecostals, and 510 million assorted Charismatics who share a heritage or common beliefs with the Pentecostal movement. If the Holiness movement and Pentecostal/Charismatic Christians were counted together, the total population would be around 600 million.

== Denominations and associations ==
Several organizations and programs exist to promote the Holiness movement, plan missions, and promote ecumenism among churches:

- Christian Holiness Partnership
- Interchurch Holiness Convention
- Global Wesleyan Alliance
- Holiness Unto the Lord
- Worldwide Faith Missions
- One Mission Society
- Wesleyan Holiness Consortium
- World Gospel Mission
- Wesleyan Holiness Women Clergy

The Holiness movement led to the formation and further development of several Christian denominations and associations. Below are denominations that substantially adhere to Holiness movement doctrine. Though denominations of the Conservative Holiness movement affirm the same beliefs, they are more strict in practice and are not included here (see list). Holiness Pentecostal bodies are not included, as they affirm a third work of grace—a belief vehemently rejected by the Holiness movement:

=== Methodist ===
- Association of Independent Methodists
- Bible Missionary Church
- Christ's Sanctified Holy Church
- Church of the Nazarene
- Church of Christ (Holiness) U.S.A.
- Church of Daniel's Band
- Church of God by Faith
- Congregational Methodist Church
- Evangelical Church of North America
- Evangelical Methodist Church
- Free Methodist Church
- Global Methodist Church
- God's Missionary Church
- Immanuel General Mission (Japan)
- International Fellowship of Bible Churches
- Kentucky Mountain Holiness Association
- Metropolitan Church Association
- Missionary Methodist Church
- National Association of Wesleyan Evangelicals
- Lumber River Conference of the Holiness Methodist Church
- Original Church of God
- Pillar of Fire International
- Primitive Methodist Church
- The Salvation Army
- Southern Congregational Methodist Church
- United Methodist Church (certain districts and local churches, as well as universities) (Note: In addition to these separate denominational groupings, one needs to give attention to the large pockets of the Holiness movement that have remained within the United Methodist Church. The most influential of these would be the circles dominated by Asbury College and Asbury Theological Seminary (both in Wilmore, KY), but one could speak of other colleges, innumerable local campmeetings, the vestiges of various local Holiness associations, independent Holiness oriented missionary societies and the like that have had great impact within United Methodism. A similar pattern would exist in England with the role of Cliff College within Methodism in that context.(Winn 2007, p. 115))
- The Wesleyan Church

=== Anabaptist ===
- Apostolic Christian Church (Nazarene)
- Brethren in Christ Church
- Missionary Church (North-Central District and others)

=== Restorationist ===
- Church of God (Anderson)
- Churches of Christ in Christian Union

=== Quaker ===
- Evangelical Friends Church International-Eastern Region

=== Baptist ===
- Freewill Baptists (certain congregations)
- Ohio Valley Association of the Christian Baptist Churches of God

== Colleges, Bible schools, and universities ==
Many institutions of higher learning exist to promote Holiness ideas, as well as to provide a liberal arts education.

=== Methodist ===
- Ambrose University College
- Allegheny Wesleyan College
- Asbury Theological Seminary
- Asbury University
- Azusa Pacific University
- Bible Missionary Institute
- Booth College
- Eastern Nazarene College
- Evangelical Wesleyan Bible Institute
- God's Bible School and College
- Greenville University
- Hobe Sound Bible College
- Houghton University
- Central Christian College of Kansas
- Indiana Wesleyan University
- Kentucky Mountain Bible College
- Kingswood University
- John Wesley University
- MidAmerica Nazarene University
- Mount Vernon Nazarene University
- Nazarene Bible College
- Northwest Nazarene University
- Oklahoma Wesleyan University
- Olivet Nazarene University
- Penn View Bible Institute
- Pillar College
- Point Loma Nazarene University
- Roberts Wesleyan University
- Seattle Pacific University
- Southern Nazarene University
- Southern Wesleyan University
- Spring Arbor University
- Trevecca Nazarene University
- Wesley Seminary
- Wesley Biblical Seminary

=== Quaker ===
- Malone University
- Union Bible College and Academy

=== Anabaptist ===
- Messiah University
- Warner Pacific University is not an Anabaptist school

=== Restorationist ===
- Anderson University (Indiana)
- Kansas Christian College
- Mid-America Christian University
- Ohio Christian University
- Warner University

== See also ==
- Arminianism
- Theosis (Eastern Christian theology)
