= Yale-Edinburgh Group =

Christian conference

The Yale-Edinburgh Group on World Christianity and the History of Mission (abbreviated as the Yale-Edinburgh Group, or the Yale-Edinburgh Conference), founded in 1992, is an annual conference about world Christianity, which is held alternatively at Yale Divinity School or New College, University of Edinburgh.

== History ==
The first conference of Yale-Edinburgh Group was held in Yale in 1992. Beginning as an informal group of scholars invited by Lamin Sanneh, D. Willis James Professor of Missions and World Christianity, and Andrew Walls, Director of the Centre for the Study of Christianity in the Non-Western World (Now renamed as the Centre for the Study of World Christianity), the group gradually grew over the years and becomes a platform for the academic exchange of missiology and world Christianity. As of today, the conference holds alternatively between the venues of Edinburgh and New Haven. As a previous neighbour of Yale Divinity School, the Overseas Ministries Study Center also involves heavily in the conference.

According to Dana L. Robert, 'the Yale-Edinburgh Conference reasserted the mediating role of the university-based divinity school as an incubator of scholarship that interwove postcolonial approaches to mission studies with secular historical and area studies....minus the triumphalism of previous generations, the conference demonstrated that university-based and other leading mainline seminaries still had a role to play as promoters of global connections and public scholarship.'
