= Timothy Tennent =

American theologican, author, seminary president

- Born: September 24, 1959 (age 65); Atlanta, Georgia, U.S.
- Education: Oral Roberts University (BA); Gordon-Conwell Theological Seminary (MDiv); Princeton Theological Seminary (ThM); University of Edinburgh (PhD)
- Spouse: Julie Myers
- Children: 2

Timothy C. Tennent (born September 24, 1959) is an American Methodist missiologist and expert on world Christianity. As of 2025, he is the Methodist Chair of Divinity at Beeson Divinity School where he oversees their Missions and World Christianity curriculum. He formerly served as President of Asbury Theological Seminary from 2009-2024. Prior to that he taught at Gordon-Conwell Theological Seminary from 1998-2009. He was first ordained and spent many years as a minister in the United Methodist Church. In 2023, he transferred his ministerial credentials to the Global Methodist Church. He is also a direct descendant of William Tennent, the founder of Log College, which was the precursor to Princeton University.

== Education ==
Tennent's education includes a B.A. from Oral Roberts University, an M.Div. from Gordon Conwell (1984), a Th.M. from Princeton Theological Seminary (1991), and a Ph.D. from the University of Edinburgh's Centre for the Study of Christianity in the Non-Western World (1998), where his dissertation was on Indian theologian Brahmabandhab Upadhyay.

Tennent studied under Professor John Brockington, Dr James Cox, and Professor Andrew Walls, and his research focused on the rapidly growing churches outside the West. His Ph.D. dissertation was revised and published in 2000 under the title Building Christianity on Indian Foundations.

Tennent is also one of four graduates of a three-year mentoring in academic leadership program funded through a Lilly Endowment grant.

== Career ==
Tennent began his teaching career at Toccoa Falls College, where he was named Teacher of the Year in 1995. From 1998–2009, he served as professor of world missions and Indian studies at Gordon-Conwell Theological Seminary in South Hamilton, Massachusetts.

He was elected to his current post as president of Asbury Seminary on February 17, 2009, and his tenure began on July 1, 2009. Tennent succeeded Ellsworth Kalas as president of Asbury. He continues to serve as a visiting professor at the Luther W. New Jr. Theological College of Dehradun, India where he has taught each summer since 1988.

In November 2009, Tennent signed an ecumenical statement known as the Manhattan Declaration calling on evangelicals, Catholics and Orthodox not to comply with rules and laws permitting abortion, same-sex marriage and other matters that go against their religious consciences.

== Theology ==
Tennent has a Wesleyan-Arminian theology.

== Published works ==
=== Books ===
- Tennent, Timothy (2000). Building Christianity on Indian foundations: the legacy of Brahmabāndhav Upādhyāy (1861-1907). ISPCK. ISBN 978-8172145729.
- ——— (2002). Christianity at the Religious Roundtable. Grand Rapids: Baker Academic. ISBN 978-0-8010-2602-7.
- ——— (2007). Theology in the Context of World Christianity. Grand Rapids: Zondervan. ISBN 978-0-310-27511-4.
- ——— (2010). Invitation to World Missions: a trinitarian missiology for the twenty-first century. Grand Rapids: Kregel Academic. ISBN 978-0-8254-3883-7.
- ———; Ott, Craig; Strauss, Stephen (2010). Encountering Theology of Mission. Grand Rapids: Baker Academic. ISBN 978-0-8010-2662-1.
- ——— (2011). This We Believe! Meditations on the Apostles' Creed (ebook ed.). Seedbed Publishing.
- ——— (2013). Ten Words, Two Signs, One Prayer: Core Practices of the Christian Faith (ebook ed.). Asbury Theological Seminary.

=== Articles & chapters ===
- ——— (1998). "Equipping Missionary for the Resistant". In Woodberry, J. Dudley (ed.). Reaching the Resistant: Barriers and Bridges for Mission. Evangelical Missiological Society Series. Vol. 6. William Carey Library. ISBN 978-0878083800.
- ——— (2005). "The Challenge of Churchless Christianity: An Evangelical Assessment". International Bulletin of Missionary Research. 29 (4): 171–177. doi:10.1177/239693930502900401. S2CID 149315635.
- ——— (Fall 2006). "Followers of Jesus (Isa) in Islamic Mosques: A Closer Examination of C-5 "High Spectrum" Contextualization". International Journal of Frontier Missions. 23 (3): 101–115.
- ——— (2008). "The Ministries for Which We Teach: A World Cafe Model". In Warford, Malcolm (ed.). Revitalizing Practice. New York: Peter Lang. ISBN 978-1-4331-0225-7.
- ——— (2013). "Why I Am an Evangelical and a Methodist". In Chute, Anthony L.; Morgan, Christopher W.; Peterson, Robert A. (eds.). Why We Belong. Wheaton, IL: Crossway. ISBN 978-1433514838.
