= David Kerr (religion scholar) =

British scholar

David A. Kerr
- Born: 16 May 1945; London
- Died: 14 April 2008 (aged 62)
- Occupations: Scholar of Christian-Muslim relations and World Christianity
- Known for: Christian-Muslim relations; Christianity in the Middle East; Ecumenics
- Spouse: Gun Holmström
- Children: Simeon and Anna

Academic background
- Education: St Antony's College, Oxford; Mansfield College, Oxford; SOAS, University of London
- Doctoral advisor: Albert Hourani

Academic work
- Discipline: Islamic Studies, Missiology, World Christianity
- Institutions: Selly Oak Colleges; Hartford Seminary; University of Edinburgh; University of Lund

David A. Kerr (16 May 1945 – 14 April 2008) was a British scholar of Christian-Muslim relations and world Christianity.

== Biography ==
Kerr was born and raised in London to Agape Jean, the daughter of Scottish missionaries in China (1921–1927) and Wilfred Kerr, a minister of the United Reformed Church. He conducted his studies in Arabic and Islamic Studies at SOAS, University of London (1963–1966), theology at Mansfield College, Oxford (1966–1968), and a PhD at St Antony's College, Oxford (1969–1973). His doctoral work on church-state relations in Lebanon was supervised by the scholar of Middle Eastern studies, Albert Hourani.

Kerr worked for a short time as a journalist with the BBC World Service. He later took up a position teaching Islamic studies at the Selly Oak Colleges (now part of the University of Birmingham) in 1973, founding the Centre for the Study of Islam and Christian-Muslim Relations in 1976. In 1987, he became the director of the Duncan Black Macdonald Center for the Study of Islam and Christian-Muslim studies at Hartford Seminary, before returning to the UK in 1996 to succeed Andrew Walls as professor of Christianity in the Non-Western World and as the director of the Centre for the Study of Christianity in the Non-Western World at the University of Edinburgh. In 2005, he took up a post at the University of Lund as a professor of Missiology and Ecumenics. Shortly after arriving in Sweden, he was diagnosed with amyotrophic lateral sclerosis and died in 2008.

His wife, Gun Holmström, was a Finnish student in London when they first met in his father's church. They married in Finland in 1970 and had two children, Simeon and Anna.

== Academic work ==
Kerr was an active administrator of a number of academic centres around the world. He was also known for his supervision of master's degree and PhD students from various parts of Africa and Asia, for most of whom English was not their first language. It is said that while he was the director for the Centre for the Study of Christianity in the Non-Western World, he had oversight of over 30 students at a given time. Stephen Goodwin comments:

David belonged to that set of scholars who saw their principle task to be the education, support and development of their students; the student subsequently would be the primary witness of the scholar's work, rather than the contemporary tendency, under the pressure of publications-based funding, to issue forth a stream of books.

Although Kerr never produced an academic monograph himself, he was well respected for his scholarship as can be seen in the two-volume Festschrift produced in his honour:

- Goodwin, Stephen R., ed. (2009). World Christianity in Local Context: Essays in Memory of David A. Kerr. London: Continuum. ISBN 978-1-84706-510-0.
- Goodwin, Stephen R., ed. (2011). World Christianity in Muslim Encounter: Essays in Memory of David A. Kerr. London: Continuum. ISBN 978-1-4411-8722-2.

The appendix of his Festschrift lists significant articles in the areas of Christian-Muslim relations (including historical, theological, missiological, and regional studies), Middle Eastern Christianity, and Ecumenics.
