= Cambridge Centre for Christianity Worldwide =

English theological institution

Coordinates: 52°12′38″N 0°06′41″E

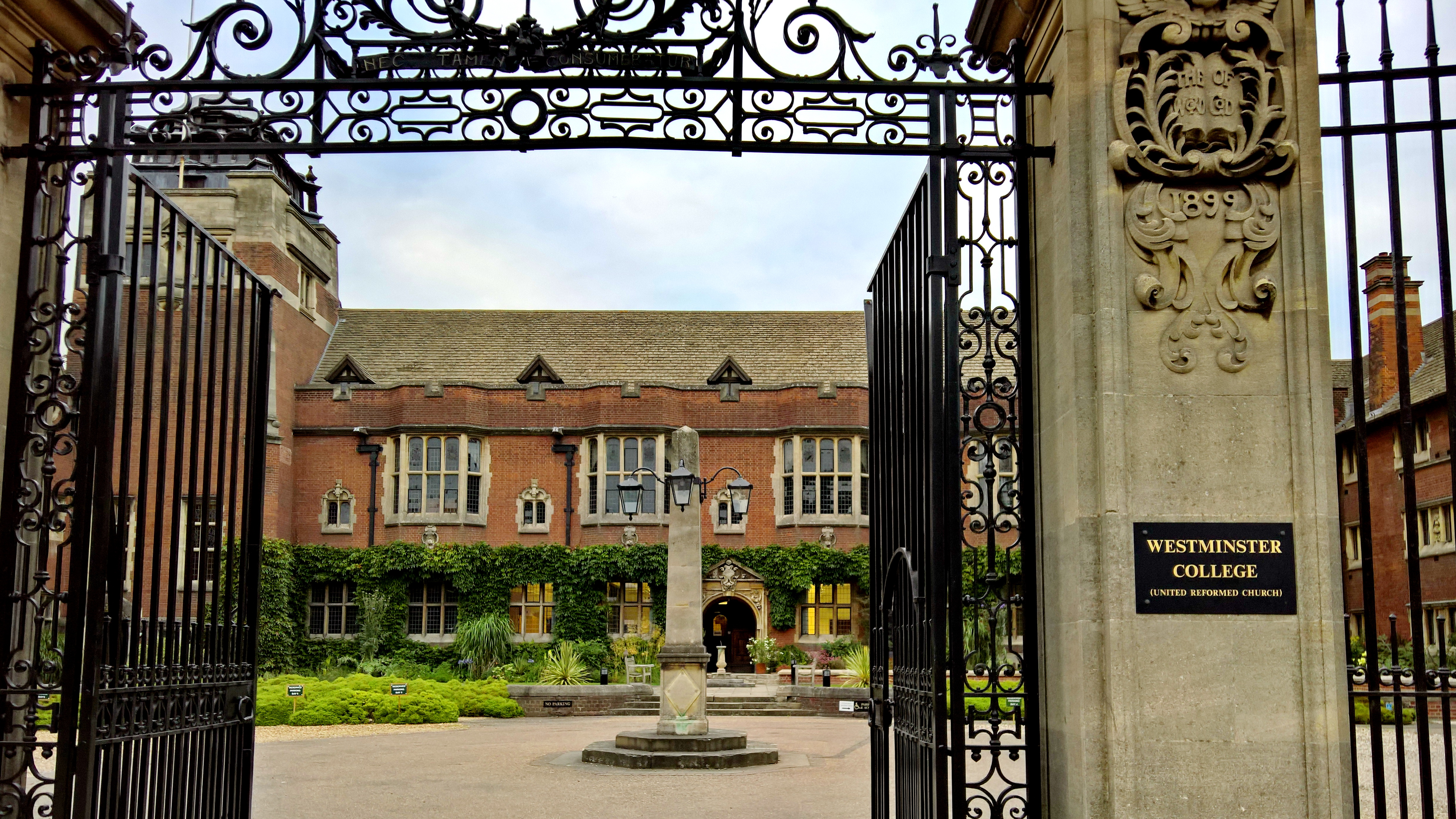
Entrance to Westminster College and the Cambridge Centre for Christianity Worldwide

The Cambridge Centre for Christianity Worldwide (CCCW) is a study, teaching and research centre in Cambridge, England and a member of the Cambridge Theological Federation which is affiliated with the University of Cambridge.

== History ==
The centre was established in 1881 by a trust created in memory of Henry Martyn (1781-1812), a Fellow of St John’s College, Cambridge, who served as a missionary to India and Persia with the British East India Company. The trust was initially created for the purpose of constructing the Henry Martyn Memorial Hall, which was built in 1886-7 on Market Street next to Holy Trinity Church. The hall served as a place for lectures on Christian missions for members of the university and the general public as well as a gathering place for mission societies and student groups like the Cambridge Missionary Church Union (CMCU), the Cambridge Inter-Collegiate Christian Union (CICCU), the Young Men’s Christian Association (YMCA), and the Young Women’s Christian Association (YWCA). Faculty members and students of the university had direct ties to these bodies, as well as the Church Missionary Society (1799), the Universities’ Mission to Central Africa (1860), the China Inland Mission (1865), the Cambridge Seven (1885) and the Student Volunteer Movement (1886). During the nineteenth and twentieth centuries several hundred graduates from the University of Cambridge served in overseas mission as educators, physicians, linguists, and clergymen.

During the 1990s the Henry Martyn Memorial Hall transitioned from a lecture hall, with a library, to a formal academic centre for research and study in history and World Christianity as a member of the Cambridge Theological Federation. In 1992, the mission theologian Graham Kings, who later became Bishop of Sherborne, was appointed as the inaugural lecturer in missiology in the Federation. Under Kings' leadership the Henry Martyn Hall relocated its library to Westminster College, changed its name to the Henry Martyn Centre (HMC), and became formally affiliated with the Cambridge Theological Federation and the Cambridge University Faculty of Divinity. Following the Centre's initiative, the archives and library of the Society for the Promotion of Christian Knowledge (SPCK) moved from its offices in London to the Cambridge University Library in 1998. In 2014 the HMC became the Cambridge Centre for Christianity Worldwide to reflect academic trends in the study of Christianity as a worldwide phenomenon. The CCCW library contains more than 10,000 books and over 100 journals related to the study of history and World Christianity. The library is associated with the Cambridge University Library (referred to as the University Library, or simply the UL). The holdings of the CCCW are registered with the National Archives of the United Kingdom and comprise materials related to the history of missions in Africa, Asia and Latin America. The collection includes the papers of John Edward Church (1899-1989), a graduate of Emmanuel College, Cambridge, and a leader in the East African Revival.

== People ==
Graham Kings, who was appointed by the Henry Martyn Trust as missiology lecturer in 1992, served as the founding director of the Henry Martyn Centre from 1996 to 2000. From 2000 to 2001, the Korean theologian Sebastian C H Kim, now assistant provost for the Korean Studies Centre and professor of theology and public life at the Fuller Theological Seminary, Pasadena, California, was the interim director. The British historian Brian Stanley served as its director from 2001 to 2008, before becoming the professor of World Christianity and director of the Centre for the Study of World Christianity at the University of Edinburgh in 2009.

Emma Wild-Wood was the director of the Centre from 2009 to 2018. From 2015 to 2017, Wild-Wood was seconded to the Divinity Faculty of Cambridge University and Jesse Zink was the interim director. Muthuraj Swamy, the current director of the Centre, moved in 2018 from South India. Specialists in history and World Christianity serve as research associates at the centre, including the British historian Ian Randall, known for his works on the history of evangelicalism.

== Research ==
CCCW has facilitated inter-university scholarship from Western and non-Western academics, linking together the universities of Cambridge, Edinburgh and London with the University of Wisconsin, Boston College and Fuller Theological Seminary. Scholars affiliated with the centre produce work on interfaith dialogue, social justice, missions history, the history of Evangelicalism, and World Christianity.
