= Graham Kings =

English bishop, theologian, poet (born 1953)

The Right Reverend Graham Kings
- Honorary Assistant bishop, Diocese of Ely
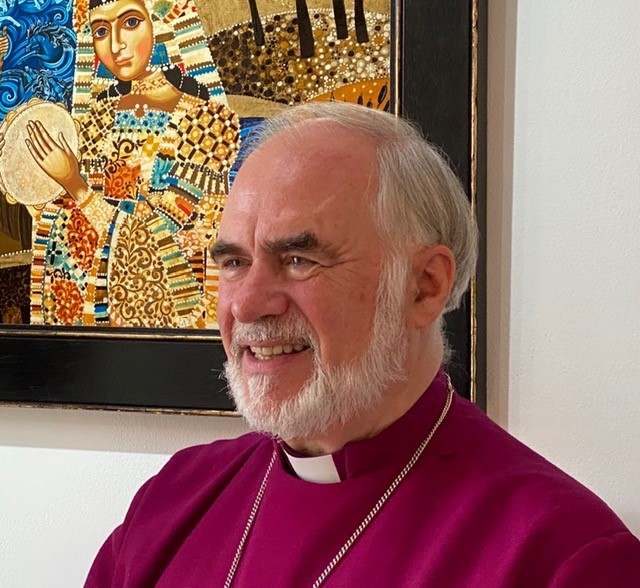
- In office: 17 Nov 2020 – present
- Other post: Bishop of Sherborne (2009–2015)

Orders
- Ordination: 1980
- Consecration: 24 June 2009

Personal details
- Born: 10 October 1953 (age 73) Barkingside, Essex, England
- Denomination: Anglican
- Spouse: Alison
- Children: Three adult daughters
- Profession: Bishop, Theologian
- Education: Hertford College, Oxford

Graham Kings (born 10 October 1953) is an English Church of England bishop, theologian and poet. In retirement in Cambridge, having served as Bishop of Sherborne and then Mission Theologian in the Anglican Communion, he is an Honorary Assistant Bishop in the Diocese of Ely and Research Associate at the Cambridge Centre for Christianity Worldwide, which he founded in 1996. His latest books are: Nourishing Connections (Canterbury Press, 2020), Nourishing Mission: Theological Settings (Brill, 2022), Exchange of Gifts: The Vision of Simon Barrington-Ward (Ekklesia, 2022), edited with Ian Randall.

== Early life and education ==
Kings was born in Barkingside, Essex, England, on the eastern outskirts of London. He is one of two children. He was educated at Chigwell County Primary School (1958–65); Buckhurst Hill County High School, the Royal Military Academy Sandhurst, Hertford College, Oxford (1973–77, BA/MA, Law, one year, Theology, 3 years); Ridley Hall, Cambridge (1978–80 Ordination training); Selwyn College, Cambridge, (1979–80, DipTh in New Testament post graduate studies); and Utrecht University (1998–2002 PhD by extension). He was an Honorary Fellow of Durham University (2015–18).

== Career ==
Between school and Oxford, Kings was commissioned as a 2nd lieutenant in the 5th Royal Inniskilling Dragoon Guards on a short service limited commission (February to September 1973) and served as a tank troop leader in Munster, West Germany. Between Oxford and Cambridge, his first year of marriage, he was a caretaker at All Souls Church, Langham Place, in London (1977–78). Kings was ordained deacon at Michaelmas 1980 (28 September), by Hewlett Thompson, Bishop of Willesden, at St Mary's, Ealing, and ordained a priest at Michaelmas 1981 (27 September), by Graham Leonard, Bishop of London, at St Paul's Cathedral. He served as a curate in St Mark's Harlesden (1980–84), founding an open youth club there. He then spent seven years as a Church Mission Society mission partner as Director of Studies, and then as Vice-Principal, at St Andrew's College, Kabare, Kenya, working with Bishop David Gitari, Bishop of Mount Kenya East and later Bishop of Kirinyaga, and supervising the building of a new Library, Chapel and Archive Centre. He was appointed an Honorary Canon of St Andrew's Cathedral in Kerugoya, Kenya, in October 1991, at his farewell graduation ceremony, and the Kings family returned to Britain in November 1991.

In January 1992 Kings became the first Lecturer in Mission Studies at the Cambridge Theological Federation a new post supported by the Henry Martyn Trust. His study was at Ridley Hall, Cambridge. Kwame Bediako, a Ghanaian theologian, preached at his commissioning service at Holy Trinity Church, Cambridge on 20 January.

In July 1995, Kings moved to Westminster College, Cambridge, the library from the Henry Martyn Hall, next to Holy Trinity Cambridge, and his study from Ridley Hall. He served as the founding Director of the Henry Martyn Library, for the study of mission and world Christianity, at Westminster College, which was formally opened by Kenneth Cragg on 22 January 1996. This became the Henry Martyn Centre for the study of mission and world Christianity, and an Associate Member of the Cambridge Theological Federation, in 1998. Kings initiated the move of the SPCK archives and library from Holy Trinity Church, Marylebone, to the Cambridge University Library, which was also completed in 1998. The centre was renamed the Cambridge Centre for Christianity Worldwide in 2014.

From 1995, Kings became an affiliated lecturer in the Faculty of Divinity of the University of Cambridge and its representative on the board of the Centre for African Studies, University of Cambridge. He attracted a six-year international, inter-university project to the Faculty of Divinity, funded by the Pew Charitable Trusts, USA, which was directed by Brian Stanley (1996–2002), the North Atlantic Missiology Project (later renamed the Currents in World Christianity project), and was located at the Henry Martyn Centre. The project eventually published 24 Eerdmans books in the ‘Studies in the History of Christian Missions’ series. He also attracted the Christianity in Asia project to the Faculty of Divinity, directed by Archie Lee, which published Christian Theology in Asia (CUP, 2008), edited by Sebastian C H Kim.

During this period in Cambridge, Kings studied at Utrecht University for a PhD in theology, supervised by Jan Jongeneel, in Utrecht, and by Daniel W. Hardy and Brian Stanley, in Cambridge. He was awarded the PhD in March 2002 and it was published as Christianity Connected: Hindus, Muslims and the World in the Letters of Max Warren and Roger Hooker (Boekencentrum, 2002) and was republished by ISPCK in India in 2017, with a foreword by Jayakiran Sebastian.

On 28 September 2000, Kings was inducted as vicar of St Mary's Islington, an historic Evangelical church in the Diocese of London, and served for 9 years. He arranged the renovation of the church Neighbourhood Centre and the crypt of the church, putting in a lift through the Georgian vault, 2008–09, to provide access for all, and founded the St Mary Islington Community Partnership, since renamed Mary's.

While at Islington, in September 2003, Kings founded, with others, Fulcrum as an online open evangelical Anglican journal, of which he was the theological secretary till 2019, and in 2006 he founded, with Christopher Wells, Covenant, a site for young emerging theologians of The Episcopal Church in the USA.

On 24 June 2009, Kings was consecrated bishop by Rowan Williams, Archbishop of Canterbury, at Westminster Abbey to serve as the Bishop of Sherborne, in the Diocese of Salisbury, covering especially the county of Dorset. Prof David F. Ford, preached the sermon. St Aldhelm was the first Bishop of Sherborne, 705–709. Kings's lecture at the Catholic Theological Union, Chicago, in Feb 2010, was developed into an article, ‘Doing Theology as a Bishop’, which describes confirmations, schools, missions, theological seminars and alpha courses. Kings chaired the historic Salisbury-Sudan link and visited South Sudan three times, writing a series of Guardian articles about the country.

On 15 July 2015, Kings was appointed by the Archbishop of Canterbury, Justin Welby, as ‘Mission Theologian in the Anglican Communion’ and was commissioned formally at Canterbury Cathedral on 13 September 2015. This involved resigning from the see of Sherborne and was an innovative post created by the partnership of the Archbishop, the Church Mission Society and Durham University. Kings was appointed as Honorary Fellow of Durham University for three years and was also a Senior Member of both St Chad's College and St John's College, Durham. His inaugural project lecture, in Durham and Lambeth Palace, was on ‘Sarah the Mother of Mission’, in June and July 2016. In October 2016 he lectured at the Pontifical Urban University, Rome, on ‘Evangelical-Roman Dialogue on Mission, 1977–1984.’

Kings and his wife lived in Bermondsey and he had a research desk at Lambeth Palace Library. The purpose of the Mission Theology in the Anglican Communion project was to discover emerging theologians in the global South and encourage them to write, network, publish and engage with theologians in the global North. He co-chaired national conferences in Cairo, Bengaluru, and Recife, and international conferences in Jerusalem and Dallas and was present at Limuru, Kenya. The project site has 103 original articles and its three books, preparing for the Lambeth Conference 2020, have been published by the Anglican Communion Office. They are on Walking Together (2018), Witnessing Together (2019) and Listening Together (2020), edited by Kings's successor in the project, and Director of the Cambridge Centre for Christianity Worldwide, Muthuraj Swamy, and Stephen Spencer, Director for Theological Education in the Anglican Communion.

Kings served as Honorary Assistant Bishop and World Mission Advisor in the Diocese of Southwark, in particular at St Matthew’s Church, Elephant and Castle, before retiring to Cambridge in 2020 where he is Honorary Assistant Bishop in the Diocese of Ely and Research Associate in the Cambridge Centre for Christianity Worldwide.

Kings served on the Liturgical Commissions of the Anglican Church of Kenya and of the Church of England, the Mission Theology Advisory Group of the Church of England, and the Network for Inter Faith Concerns of the Anglican Communion. In April 2019, the Archbishop of Canterbury awarded him the Cross of St Augustine, for services to the Anglican Communion.

He has commissioned and collaborated with three artists in particular. In 1991, Benson Ndaka carved the six mahogany door panels, and one relief sculpture of African Christian Theology, for the library of St Andrew's College, Kabare. In 2003, Jonathan Clarke sculpted ‘Christ Blessing the Children’, a lectern for St Mary Islington, and in 2009 ‘Sign’ for Queen Elizabeth School, Wimborne, Dorset. From 2003 to 2020, Silvia Dimitrova painted seven paintings of Women in the Bible for the Kings family.

== Publications ==
Kings' publications include:

- Offerings from Kenya to Anglicanism (Grove Liturgical Study, 2001), with Geoff Morgan
- Signs and Seasons: a Guide for Your Christian Journey (Canterbury Press, 2008) with Tom Wright
- Christianity Connected: Hindus, Muslims and the World in the Letters of Max Warren and Roger Hooker (Boekencentrum, 2002 and ISPCK, 2017)
- Nourishing Connections (Canterbury Press, 2020)
- Nourishing Mission: Theological Settings (Brill, 2022)
- Polyglot from the Far Side of the Moon: The Life and Works of Solomon Caesar Malan (1812-1894) (contributor) (Monumenta Serica Institute, 2022)

He has edited two books:

- Out of the Depths: Hope in Times of Suffering (Anglican Communion Office, 2017)
- Exchange of Gifts: The Vision of Simon Barrington-Ward (Ekklesia, 2022), edited with Ian Randall.

He has published various chapters in books including:

- ‘The Meeting of Faiths: Max Warren and John V Taylor’, in Kevin Ward and Brian Stanley (eds), The Church Mission Society and World Christianity, 1799–1999 (Eerdmans, 2000).
- ‘Worship on Upper Street’ in Tim Stratford, Worship: Window of the Urban Church (SPCK, 2006).
- ‘Foreword’ to Caroline Hodgson and Heather Smith (eds), The Joy of Being Anglican (Redemptorist Publications, 2017).
- ‘Afterword: Maps Matter and Myths Matter’ to Mark A. Lamport (ed.), Encyclopedia of Christianity in the Global South (Rowman & Littlefield, 2018) Vol 2.

He has published numerous articles in The Times and The Guardian and on Fulcrum, Covenant and Mission Theology in the Anglican Communion. These are included in his 2020 website, ‘Nourishing Connections’ www.grahamkings.org, which has sections on articles, chapters, books, poems, galleries and art.

== Styles ==
- The Reverend Graham Kings (1980–1991)
- The Reverend Canon Graham Kings (1991–2002)
- The Reverend Canon Doctor Graham Kings (2002–2009)
- The Right Reverend Doctor Graham Kings (2009–present)

Church of England titles
| Preceded by Tim Thornton | Bishop of Sherborne; 2009–15 July 2015 | Succeeded by Karen Gorham |
