= Mark Gornik =

American theologian, pastor and author (born 1961)

Mark R. Gornik
- Born: 1961; Baltimore, Maryland, U.S.
- Education: Covenant College (B.A., 1983); Westminster Theological Seminary (M.Div., 1986); University of Edinburgh (Ph.D., 2008)
- Occupation: Theologian · Missiologist · Pastor · Author
- Years active: 1986–present
- Organizations: City Seminary of New York; New Song Community Church (Baltimore); Christian Reformed Church in North America
- Known for: Founder and director of City Seminary of New York; studies of African immigrant churches; urban ministry praxis
- Notable work: To Live in Peace: Biblical Faith and the Changing Inner City (2002); Word Made Global: Stories of African Christianity in New York City (2011)
- Spouse: Rita Aszalos
- Children: 2

Mark R. Gornik (born 1961) is an American theologian, missiologist, author, pastor, and director of City Seminary of New York. He has researched and written about urban ministry, community development, theological education, and the study of global Christianity, particularly African Christianity in New York City.

== Early life and education ==
Gornik grew up in Baltimore, Maryland. He earned a B.A. from Covenant College (1983), an M.Div. from Westminster Theological Seminary (1986), and a Ph.D. from the Centre for the Study of World Christianity at the University of Edinburgh (2008) studying under Andrew Walls. His research, ministry, and writing has focused on both urban ministry and global Christianity, with an emphasis on African immigrant churches in New York City.

== Ministry and work in Sandtown, Baltimore ==
Gornik co-founded New Song Community Church in the Sandtown neighborhood of Baltimore in 1986, alongside Susan and Allan Tibbells. Gornik and his colleagues drew on the community development work of John M. Perkins in establishing programs in a 12-block area of Baltimore.

New Song established a health center, a school, economic-development programs, and a housing organization affiliated with Habitat for Humanity. Gornik later said that his work in Sandtown influenced his views of faith and urban ministry.

== Founding of City Seminary of New York ==
Gornik moved to New York City in 1998 to help establish New Song Community Church in Harlem. He observed a large number of pastors and ministry leaders, particularly from immigrant communities, who had not attended traditional seminaries. Gornik later developed a model of theological education aimed at pastors and ministry leaders who had not attended traditional seminaries.

In 2003, Gornik founded City Seminary of New York, an institution dedicated to training leaders for ministry in urban and immigrant contexts. Gornik has focused on the importance of grassroots ministry and peacemaking as core principles of theological training. Gornik has said that his experience in Baltimore influenced his approach at City Seminary, particularly his emphasis on developing leadership within local communities.

== Research on global Christianity ==
Gornik's doctoral research, conducted under Andrew Walls at the University of Edinburgh, examined the role of African congregations in New York City. Through years of ethnographic study, he researched the migration patterns of African Christians and their establishment of church communities in the city.

His 2011 book, Word Made Global: African Christianity in Motion, examines African churches in New York and their connections to migration, ministry, and transnational Christianity. This book won a 2012 Christianity Today Book of the Year Award.

Along with several full-length books that he has written or edited, Gornik has also published dozens of journal articles and reviews, almost all dealing with urban ministry or global Christianity.

== Views on ministry and theological education ==
Gornik has argued that theological education should be rooted in the communities where ministry takes place. He has also emphasized the role of local institutions in developing leadership and responding to social and economic conditions. Gornik has said that his ministry model was inspired by his seminary professors Harvie Conn and Tim Keller.

== Personal life ==
Gornik is married to Rita Aszalos, a physician, and they have two children. He is an ordained minister in the Christian Reformed Church of North America.

== Selected publications ==
- Gornik, Mark (2002). To Live in Peace: Biblical Faith and the Changing Inner City. Eerdmans. ISBN 9780802846853.
- Gornik, Mark; Burrows, William R.; McLean, Janice A. (2011). Understanding World Christianity: The Vision and Work of Andrew F. Walls. Orbis Books. ISBN 9781570759499.
- Gornik, Mark (2011). Word Made Global: Stories of African Christianity in New York. Eerdmans. ISBN 9780802864482.
- Gornik, Mark; Wong, Maria Liu (2017). Stay in the City: How Christian Faith is Flourishing in an Urban World. Eerdmans. ISBN 9780802874047.
- Gornik, Mark (2024). Sharing the Crust: A Communion of Saints in a Baltimore Neighborhood. Cascade Books. ISBN 9781666753547.
