= Dunnam =

Dunnam is a surname. Notable people with the surname include:

- Jim Dunnam (born 1963), American politician and trial attorney
- Maxie Dunnam (born 1934), American United Methodist Church minister, evangelist, Bible commentator, and writer
- Stephanie Dunnam (born 1959), American actress
