= Studies in World Christianity =

- Discipline: Religious Studies
- Language: English

Publication details
- History: 1995–present
- Publisher: Edinburgh University Press (Scotland)
- Frequency: Triannually

Standard abbreviations
- ISO 4: Stud. World Christ.

Indexing
- ISSN: 1354-9901 (print); 1750-0230 (web)
- OCLC no.: 52322269

Links
- Journal homepage

Studies in World Christianity is a peer-reviewed academic journal which examines the development of Christianity worldwide – known broadly as World Christianity. Its primary interests are in the rich diversity of Christianity in Africa, Asia, Latin America, Oceania, and eastern Europe, as well as diasporic forms of non-Western Christianity emerging in contexts such as Western Europe and North America. Articles in the journal engage a variety of academic disciplines – historical, theological, and social scientific.

The journal is published three times a year in April, August and December by Edinburgh University Press. It is associated with the Centre for the Study of World Christianity (CSWC), formerly the Centre for the Study of Non-Western Christianity, in the School of Divinity at the University of Edinburgh. The journal is currently edited by Alexander Chow and Emma Wild-Wood.

== History ==
The journal was founded in April 1995 as Studies in World Christianity: The Edinburgh Review of Theology and Religion. Its founding editor was James P. Mackey (1934–2020), who was the Thomas Chalmers Chair of Theology and the previous Dean of the Faculty of Divinity (1984–1988) at New College, Edinburgh. Mackey was instrumental in the development of world Christianity in terms of relocating the CSWC with the employment of Andrew Walls and founding the journal, although he himself was trained in philosophical theology and Celtic theology.
