= Edward Fasholé-Luke =

Sierra Leone Creole Christian theologian

Edward W. Fasholé-Luke (born 1934) is a Sierra Leone Creole Anglican theologian.

== Biography ==
Born in 1934 in Freetown, Sierra Leone, Fasholé-Luke received a BA in general studies from Fourah Bay College (1959). He went for further studies in the United Kingdom, pursuing a BA in theology from St John's College, Durham (1963) and being ordained an Anglican priest in Durham. He then completed a PhD in theology from King's College, Aberdeen (1969), studying with Andrew Walls in the Centre for the Study of Christianity in the Non-Western World and writing a PhD thesis on "The Doctrine of the Church in the Writings of St. Cyprian of Carthage."

After his studies, Fasholé-Luke returned to Sierra Leone and taught theology at Fourah Bay College, beginning in 1969, and serving as its senior chaplain since 1985. He maintained his interest in biblical and patristic studies, but also worked on developing an African Christian theology that was relevant to the social and political setting of West Africa.

== Works ==
=== Books ===
- Fasholé-Luke, Edward W.; Gray, Richard; Hastings, Adrian; Tasie, Godwin, eds. (1978). Christianity in Independent Africa. Indiana University Press. ISBN 978-0-253-37506-3.
- Glasswell, Mark E.; Fasholé-Luke, Edward W., eds. (1974). New Testament Christianity for Africa and the World: Essays in Honour of Harry Sawyerr. S.P.C.K. ISBN 9780281027835.

=== Articles ===
- Fasholé-Luke, Edward W. (October 1981). "Footpaths and Signposts to African Christian Theologies". Scottish Journal of Theology. 34 (5): 385–414. doi:10.1017/S0036930600055277. S2CID 170911954.
- Fasholé-Luke, Edward W. (December 1976). "The relevance of early church history for the training of ministers in West Africa". African Ecclesiastical Review. 17 (6): 320–328. ISSN 0250-4650.
- Fasholé-Luke, Edward W. (April 1976). "The Quest for African Christian Theologies". Scottish Journal of Theology. 29 (2): 159–176. doi:10.1017/S0036930600042575.
- Fasholé-Luke, E. W. (August 1970). "Christian unity: St. Cyprian's and Ours". Scottish Journal of Theology. 23 (3): 312–322. doi:10.1017/S0036930600021621.
