= TMS Global =

TMS Global is an interdenominational Christian organization that recruits, trains, and sends cross-cultural workers around the world. Based in Norcross, Georgia, United States, TMS Global was incorporated on January 6, 1984. The organization is Wesleyan in theology and currently supports more than 225 missionaries to 32 nations.

== History ==
TMS Global was founded in 1984 as The Mission Society for United Methodists, a supplemental mission-sending agency to the United Methodist Church's General Board of Global Ministries (GBGM). H.T. Maclin, the founding president and president emeritus, had previously served with GBGM for 20 years in Congo and Kenya before coming on staff with the organization. He resigned in 1983 to found TMS Global, along with other United Methodists. Other founders of the organization included Ellsworth Kalas and David Seamands

TMS Global's board of directors voted to change the name to "The Mission Society" in 2006, in order to reflect the interdenominational nature of the organization.

TMS Global currently has more than 200 missionaries from many denominational backgrounds serving in 34 countries.

== Operations ==
TMS Global receives no denominational funding and is supported by individuals and churches, primarily located in the United States. All missionaries are responsible for raising their own financial support. TMS Global is a member of the Evangelical Council for Financial Accountability (ECFA), an accreditation agency for Christian ministries.

In addition to recruiting the training missionaries, TMS Global's church culture department trains congregations in the United States and abroad to conduct missionary work.

TMS Global published a quarterly magazine, Unfinished, about its work around the world. The magazine was formerly named Heartbeat, before undergoing a design change in 2006. Unfinished was awarded a 2007 Award of Merit from the Evangelical Press Association (EPA) on May 9, 2008.

== List of President/CEOs ==
- 1984–1991 - H.T. Maclin
- 1991–1994 - Julia McLean Williams
- 1994–2000 - Alvern Vom Steeg
- 2001–2009 - Phillip R. Granger
- 2009–2014 - Dick McClain
- 2014–present - Max Wilkins
