= Church History (journal) =

- Discipline: Ecclesiastical history
- Language: English
- Edited by: Amanda Porterfield; John Corrigan

Publication details
- History: 1932–present
- Publisher: Cambridge University Press on behalf of the American Society of Church History (United States)
- Frequency: Quarterly

Standard abbreviations
- ISO 4: Church Hist.

Indexing
- ISSN: 0009-6407 (print); 1755-2613 (web)
- LCCN: 36005757
- JSTOR: churchhistory
- OCLC no.: 173441073

Links
- Journal homepage; Online access; Online archive

Church History: Studies in Christianity and Culture is a quarterly academic journal. It is published by Cambridge University Press on behalf of the American Society of Church History, and was established in 1932. It is abstracted and indexed in the ATLA Religion Database. The editors-in-chief are Andrea Sterk (University of Minnesota), Euan Cameron (Union Theological Seminary, Columbia University), Dana Robert (Boston University), and Laurie Maffly-Kipp (Washington University in St. Louis). The journal is regarded as highly authoritative in its field, and is compared to the British Journal of Ecclesiastical History.
