= Alex Chow (disambiguation) =

Alex Chow may refer to:

- Alex Chow Wing Hong (born 1990), a social activist in Hong Kong
- Alex Chow Tsz-lok (1997–2019), a student of Hong Kong University of Science and Technology who died from injuries during the 2019–20 Hong Kong protests
- Alexander Chow, a Chinese American theologian at New College, Edinburgh
