= Alexander Chow =

Chinese American theologian

External videos
- What does Jerusalem have to do with the Internet? #YaleEdin2021 Keynote

Alexander Chow (simplified Chinese: 曹荣锦; traditional Chinese: 曹榮錦; pinyin: Cáo Róngjǐn) is a Chinese American theologian. He is Senior Lecturer in Theology and World Christianity and co-director of Centre for the Study of World Christianity at New College, University of Edinburgh. His research interests include contextual theology, Christianity in China, Chinese philosophy and religion, public theology, and digital theology.

== Biography ==
Born and raised in Southern California, he completed a MA in biblical studies and theology at Fuller Theological Seminary in 2006 and a MTh in theology at Regent College in 2008. He finished his PhD in theology in 2012 at the University of Birmingham, supervised under Edmond Tang. He then spent a year in the School of Liberal Arts at Renmin University of China as a postdoctoral fellow. He joined the University of Edinburgh as a Chancellor Fellow in September 2013. He is now senior lecturer in theology and world Christianity and co-director of Centre for the Study of World Christianity.

He is an editor of the journal Studies in World Christianity and the Liu Institute Series in Chinese Christianities of Notre Dame Press. He was also the chair of Chinese Christianities Program Unit at American Academy of Religion (2015–2022).

== Writings ==
=== Edited works ===
- Chow, Alexander (Ed.). Chinese Heritage in British Christianity: More than Foreigners. London: SCM Press, 2025. ISBN 9780334066170
- Chow, Alexander (Ed.). Scottish Missions to China: Commemorating the Legacy of James Legge (1815-1897). Leiden: Brill, 2022. ISBN 9789004509634
- Chow, Alexander and Easten Law (Eds). Ecclesial Diversity in Chinese Christianity. Cham: Palgrave Macmillan, 2021. ISBN 9783030730697
- Chow, Alexander and Emma Wild-Wood (Eds). Ecumenism and Independency in World Christianity Historical Studies in Honour of Brian Stanley. Leiden: Brill, 2020. ISBN 9789004437548

=== Monographs ===
- Chinese Public Theology: Generational Shifts and Confucian Imagination in Chinese Christianity (Oxford University Press, 2018). ISBN 9780198808695
- Theosis, Sino-Christian Theology and the Second Chinese Enlightenment (Palgrave Macmillan, 2013 ISBN 9781137312617; Chinese edition: Institute of Sino-Christian Studies, 2015)
