= Dana L. Robert =

Historian of Christianity and a missiologist

Dana Lee Robert (born 1956) is an American historian of Christianity and a missiologist. She is a professor at Boston University, where she has worked since 1984. Together with her husband, M. L. Daneel, she co-founded the Center for Global Christianity and Mission in 2001, one of the first university-based Centers on World Christianity in North America. For years, Robert held the School of Theology's Truman Collins Professorship in World Christianity and History of Mission, but in 2022 she was installed in the William Fairfield Warren Distinguished Professorship, the highest distinction bestowed upon senior faculty members who remain actively involved in research, scholarship, teaching, and the University’s civic life.

== Early life ==
Robert is a graduate of Louisiana State University (BA) and Yale University (MA, MPhil, and PhD). In 1982, she became an instructor at Yale University, before moving on to Boston University. In Boston, she was assistant professor from 1984–90, associate professor from 1990–97, and became full professor in 1997.

== Scholarship ==
In the early 1980s, Dana L. Robert became captivated by what she called "Comparative Christianity." After completing her PhD at Yale University, she began teaching at Boston University where, over the following three decades, she helped build the field that is now known as World Christianity. Robert's scholarship has focused on the role of women in mission history, notably through her American Women in Mission (1997), as well as the relationship between mission history and world Christianity more broadly. She presently serves as one of the editors of the journal Church History.

In 2010, Dana Robert delivered the keynote address at the Edinburgh 2010 Conference, which marked the centennial of the World Missionary Conference of 1910, speaking on “Witnessing to Christ Today: Mission and Unity in the 'Long View' from 1910 to the 21st Century.” Robert has also given numerous other public lectures, including:

- The Henry Martyn Lectures at the Cambridge Centre for Christianity Worldwide (2010),
- The Woolsey Lectures in Theology and Culture at Houghton College (2011),
- The Wallace Chappell Lectures in Evangelism at Duke Divinity School (2012),
- The Ausberger Lecture Series at Eastern Mennonite University (2013),
- The Parchman Endowed Lecture Series at Baylor University (2015),
- The Donald A. Yerxa History Lecture at Eastern Nazarene College (2016),
- The Sprunt Lectures at Union Presbyterian Seminary (2017),
- The David C. and Virginia R. Steinmetz Memorial Lecture at Duke Divinity School, (2018),
- The Robert Laidlaw Memorial Lecture at Knox College, University of Toronto ( 2021), and
- The inaugural Gerald H. Anderson Lecture at the Overseas Ministries Study Center, Princeton Theological Seminary (2022).

== Honors ==
In 2017, Dana Robert received several honors in recognition of her contributions to history, theology, and religious studies. She was elected to the American Academy of Arts and Sciences. The American Society of Missiology awarded her with the guild's Lifetime Achievement Award. In 2024, the Overseas Ministries Study Center at Princeton Theological Seminary gave her its Lifetime Achievement Award of Excellence for her contributions to shaping the field of World Christianity. The Association of Theological Schools named her a Henry Luce III Fellow in Theology, and she served as a senior research fellow at the Leibniz Institute of European History in Mainz, Germany.

In 2021, a festschrift entitled Unlikely Friends: How God Uses Boundary-Crossing Friendships to Transform the World was published to honor her scholarship in the fields of missiology and world Christianity on boundary-crossing friendships.

== Publications ==
=== Selected books ===
- 2025. Nationalism and Internationalism in the Young Ecumenical Movement, 1895-1920s. Brill.
- 2023. Creative Collaborations: Case Studies of North American Missional Practices. Regnum Books International.
- 2019. Faithful Friendships: Embracing Diversity in Christian Community. Wm. B. Eerdmans.
- 2017. African Christian Biography. (Editor) Cluster Books.
- 2010. Joy to the World!: Mission in the Age of Global Christianity. Women's Division, United Methodist Church.
- 2009. Christian Mission: How Christianity Became a World Religion. Wiley. Currently in its 12th printing.
- 2008. Converting Colonialism: Visions and Realities in Mission History, 1706-1914, ed. Wm. B. Eerdmans.
- 2003. Occupy Until I Come: A. T. Pierson and the Evangelization of the World. Wm. B. Eerdmans.
- African Christian Outreach: Vol. 2 Mission Churches. (Editor) Pretoria: South African Missiological Society, 2003.
- 2003. Frontiers of African Christianity: Essays in Honour of Inus Daneel. Edited with G. Cuthbertson and H. Pretorius. Pretoria: University of South Africa Press.
- 2002. Gospel Bearers, Gender Barriers: Missionary Women in the Twentieth Century, Orbis Books.
- 1998. Evangelism as the Heart of Mission. General Board of Global Ministries, The United Methodist Church.
- 1998. Christianity: A Social and Cultural History, 2nd ed. (coauthor). Prentice Hall.
- 1998. Arthur Tappan Pierson and Evangelical Movements. Seoul, Korea: Yangsuh Publishing Company, 1988. [in Korean]
- 1997. American Women in Mission: A Social History of Their Thought and Practice. Mercer University Press.

=== Recent Essays and Articles ===
- “Mission Studies and World Christianity,” in The Oxford Handbook of Mission Studies, Kirsteen Kim, Knud Jørgensen and Alison Fitchett-Climenhaga, eds. (New York: Oxford University Press, 2022): 383-402.
- “World Christianity as a Revitalization Movement,” in World Christianity: History, Methodologies, Horizons, Jehu Hanciles, ed. (Maryknoll, NY: Orbis Books, 2021): 3-22.
- “Scottish Fulfilment Theory and Friendship: Lived Religion at Edinburgh 1910,” Scottish Church History 49.2 (2020): 63–82.
- “Sacred Music and Christian Transnationalism in 1920s-1930s China and Japan,” in Ecumenism and Independency in World Christianity: Historical Studies in Honor of Brian Stanley, Alexander Chow and Emma Wild-Wood, eds. (Leiden: Brill, 2020): 221-239.
- “The Founding of the Woman’s Foreign Missionary Society and the Beginnings of Boston University,” Methodist History LVIII: 1&2 (October 2019 & January 2020): 40-54.
- “Naming 'World Christianity': Historical and Personal Perspectives on the Yale-Edinburgh Conference in World Christianity and Mission History,” International Bulletin of Mission Research 44:2 (2020): 111-128.
