= Francis C. M. Wei =

Chinese educator

Francis C. M. Wei (Chinese: 韋卓民; pinyin: Wei Zhuomin; 1888–1976) was a Chinese Christian educator and the first Chinese president of Huachung University.

== Biography ==
Wei grew up in a non-Christian home and was sent by his father, a tea merchant from Zhuhai, to receive a western education at the American Episcopal missionary school, Boone College. In 1911, he both graduated with a BA from Boone and was baptized into the Episcopal Church. He stayed at Boone to teach mathematics and pursue an MA, completing a thesis on "The Political Principles of Mencius." Wei pursued another MA in comparative philosophy at Harvard University (1918–1919), studying under William E. Hocking, before pursuing a PhD from the School of Economics, University of London (1927–1929), writing a thesis on "A Study of the Chinese Moral Tradition and Its Social Values."

In 1925, Wei served as vice president of the newly formed Huachung University and, after completing his PhD in London, he returned to Huachung to serve as its first Chinese president from 1929 until his retirement in 1951. He was also a visiting professor at Yale Divinity School (1937–1937) and was the first Henry W. Luce Visiting Professor of World Christianity at Union Theological Seminary, New York in 1945.

== Bibliography ==
- Wei, Francis C. M. (1916). The Political Principles of Mencius. Shanghai: Presbyterian Mission Press.
- Wei, Francis C. M. (1945). Rooting the Christian Church in Chinese Soil. New York: Union Theological Seminary.
- Wei, Francis C. M. (1947). The Spirit of Chinese Culture. New York: Charles Scribner's Press.
- Wei Zhuomin (1980). Wei Zhuomin Boshi jiaoyu wenhua zongjiao lun wenji 韋卓民博士教育文化宗教論文集 [Dr. Francis C.M. Wei's Writings on Education, Culture, and Religion]. Taipei: Dr. Francis C.M. Wei Memorial Hall, Huachung University.
