= Klaus Koschorke =

German historian

- Born: 13 April 1948 (age 78)
- Scientific career
- Fields: Church history, World Christianity
- Workplaces: LMU Munich

Klaus Koschorke (born 13 April 1948) is a German historian of Christianity and was a Professor of Early and Global History of Christianity at LMU Munich in Germany from 1993 to 2013.

== Biography ==
After studying Protestant theology at the Humboldt University of Berlin, the University of Edinburgh, the University of Tübingen, and Heidelberg University from 1967 to 1973, Klaus Koschorke completed his doctoral degree at Heidelberg University in 1976 with a dissertation on the newly discovered Coptic-Gnostic texts from Nag Hammadi. He was a research assistant at Heidelberg University and assistant professor at the University of Bern, where he qualified as a university lecturer in 1991 with his habilitation thesis on 4th century Greek ecclesiology (Basil of Caesarea). Also during this time he held guest professorships and teaching positions in Switzerland and in Asia (foremost in Sri Lanka, 1982/3).

== Academics ==
From 1993 to 2013, succeeding Georg Kretschmar, he held the Chair of Church history at LMU Munich. He developed it – in addition to the treatment of classical patristic themes – into the only Chair of Church history at a Faculty of Protestant Theology in German-speaking central Europe that has specialized in the history of non-western and global Christianity. Its many projects have aimed at developing an ecumenically oriented church history that pays proper attention not only to the denominational, but also to the geographical and cultural-contextual plurality of world Christianity.

Koschorke was dean of the Faculty for Protestant Theology at LMU Munich from 2003 to 2005. Regular research stays and lecture trips led him to Asia, Africa and Latin America. He inaugurated and developed the Munich-Freising-Conferences as an international platform for interdisciplinary exchange between scholars from various fields of professional expertise and regional or denominational background and as an instrument for the further development of the new historical subdiscipline "History of World Christianity". Koschorke has been appointed guest professor at Liverpool Hope University (UK) in 2010 and at the University of Basel (Switzerland, 2014–2018) and has been serving as visiting professor in Sri Lanka (since 1982), India (Madurai), China (Shanghai, Beijing, Hangzhou), Japan (Tokyo, Kyoto), Korea (Seoul), Myanmar (Mandalay) Singapore, Pakistan (Lahore), South Africa (Pretoria), Uganda and delivered repeatedly lectures in Brazil and in the United States. Current research projects are focused on the broad spectrum of (both Western and Non-Western) "Christian Internationalisms around 1910" and a comprehensive history of Christianity in Asia, Africa and Latin America 1450-2000. In 2020 he was appointed Senior fellow at the KFG “Polycentricity and Plurality of Premodern Christianities” at the History Dept. Frankfurt University. In March 2025, Koschorke was presented with the “Lifetime Achievement Award of Excellence” by the Princeton Theological Seminary for his research into the development of World Christianity Studies.

The scholarly approach to the History of World Christianity developed by Koschorke and some of his colleagues at LMU Munich has recently been labeled as the "Munich School of World Christianity". It can be characterized by its focus on three guiding principles: (1) the need for new and enlarged maps of the history of World Christianity that enable a comparative study of the different denominational, regional, and cultural expressions of Christianity; (2) an awareness of "polycentric structures" in the history of World Christianity - not only in the most recent period but from its very beginnings; and (3) a focus on transregional links between Christian groups and movements in different regions and continents and the resulting concept of a global history of Christianity as a history of multidirectional transcontinental interactions, including early instances of South–South connections.

== Editor of the following book series ==
- Studies in the History of Christianity in the Non-Western World (Asia, Africa, Latin America) (= Studien zur Außereuropäischen Christentumsgeschichte) (Asien, Afrika, Lateinamerika). Vandenhoeck und Ruprecht, Göttingen 1998ff; Harrassowitz, Wiesbaden 2002ff. (together with Johannes Meier)
- Studies in the Intercultural History of Christianity (= Studien zur Interkulturellen Geschichte des Christentums / Études d'histoire interculturelle du Christianisme). P. Lang, Frankfurt am Main/ Bern/ New York etc. 1999ff.
- Jahrbuch für vergleichende Überseegeschichte (Forschungsstiftung für vergleichende europäische Überseegeschichte). Harrassowitz, Wiesbaden 2000ff.
- The Journal of World Christianity (Member of the Editorial Board, Open-Access Journal, www.journalofworldchristianity.org, 2008ff).
- Documents on the History of Christianity in Asia, Africa, Latin America (= Dokumente zur Außereuropäischen Christentumsgeschichte (Asien, Afrika, Lateinamerika)). Harrassowitz, Wiesbaden 2010ff.
- Religion in Past and Present Brill, Leiden 2006ff. (Area Editor)

== Works (selection) ==
- The Christian Patriot: A Journal of Religious and Social Progress (Madras/Chennai 1890-1929): Digital Edition. Open Publishing LMU, Munich 2025, URL: https://discover.ub.uni-muenchen.de/chrispat, ISBN 978-3-99181-922-6.
- „Owned and Conducted entirely by the Native Christian Community“. The ‘Christian Patriot’ and the Indigenous-Christian Press in Colonial India around 1900“. Open Publishing LMU, Munich / Buchschmiede, Vienna 2025, URL: https://epub.ub.uni-muenchen.de/128595/, ISBN 978-3-99181-922-6.
- (with Ciprian Burlăcioiu, Philipp Kuster) Early South-South Links in the History of World Christianity (16th – Early 19th Century) (Studien zur Außereuropäischen Christentumsgeschichte. Asien, Afrika, Lateinamerika / Studies in the History of Christianity in the Non-Western World. Vol. 38). Harrassowitz, Wiesbaden 2024, ISBN 978-3-447-12224-5.
- A Short History of Christianity beyond the West. Asia, Africa, and Latin America 1450-2000 (Theology and Mission in World Christianity. Vol. 31). Brill, Leiden 2024, ISBN 978-90-04-69982-3.
- Grundzüge der Außereuropäischen Christentumsgeschichte. Asien, Afrika und Lateinamerika 1450-2000 (UTB Band 5934). MohrSiebeck, Tübingen 2022, ISBN 978-3-8252-5934-1.
- "Owned and Conducted entirely by the Native Christian Community". Der 'Christian Patriot' und die indigen-christliche Presse im kolonialen Indien um 1900 (Studies in the History of Christianity in the Non-Western World. Vol. 34). Harrassowitz, Wiesbaden 2019, ISBN 978-3-447-11274-1.
- (with Adrian Hermann, Frieder Ludwig, Ciprian Burlacioiu) "To give publicity to our thoughts". Journale asiatischer und afrikanischer Christen um 1900 und die Entstehung einer transregionalen indigen-christlichen Öffentlichkeit / "To give publicity to our thoughts". Journals of Asian and African Christians around 1900 and the Making of a Transregional Indigenous Christian Public Sphere (Studies in the History of Christianity in the Non-Western World. Vol. 31). Harrassowitz, Wiesbaden 2018, ISBN 978-3-447-11112-6.
- Transcontinental Links, Enlarged Maps, and Polycentric Structures in the History of World Christianity. In: Journal of World Christianity, 6/1, 2016, p. 28–56.
- (with Adrian Hermann, Ciprian Burlacioiu, Phuti Mogase) Discourses of Indigenous-Christian Elites in Colonial Societies in Asia and Africa around 1900. A Documentary Sourcebook from Selected Journals. (Documents on the History of Christianity in Asia, Africa and Latin America. Vol. 4) Harrassowitz, Wiesbaden 2016, ISBN 978-3-447-10578-1.
- (with Adrian Hermann) Polycentric Structures in the History of World Christianity / Polyzentrische Strukturen in der Geschichte des Weltchristentums. (Studies in the History of Christianity in the Non-Western World. Vol. 25). Harrassowitz, Wiesbaden 2014, ISBN 978-3-447-10258-2.
- Phases of Globalization in the History of Christianity. (Etappen der Globalisierung in christentumsgeschichtlicher Perspektive). (Studies in the History of Christianity in the Non-Western World. Vol. 19). Harrassowitz, Wiesbaden 2012, ISBN 978-3-447-06672-3.
- The Dutch Reformed Church in Colonial Ceylon (18th Century). Minutes of the Consistory of the Dutch Reformed Church in Colombo held at the Wolvendaal Church, Colombo (1735–1797). (Documents on the History of Christianity in Asia, Africa and Latin America. Vol. II), Wiesbaden 2011, ISBN 978-3-447-06546-7.
- Außereuropäische Christentumsgeschichte (Asien, Afrika, Lateinamerika) 1450 – 1990. Edited together with F. Ludwig and Mariano Delgado (Kirchen- und Theologiegeschichte in Quellen Bd. VI), 4. Auflage. Neukirchen 2012.
  - Spanish Edition: Historia del cristianismo en sus fuentes. Asia, África y América Latina [1450 – 1990] Editorial Trotta, Madrid 2012, ISBN 978-84-9879-252-2.
  - English Edition: A History of Christianity in Asia, Africa, and Latin America, 1450 – 1990. A Documentary Sourcebook. Eerdmans, Grand Rapids 2007, ISBN 978-0-8028-2889-7.
- Falling Walls. The Year 1989/90 as a Turning Point in the History of World Christianity. (Einstürzende Mauern. Das Jahr 1989/90 als Epochenjahr in der Geschichte des Weltchristentums.) (Studies in the History of Christianity in the Non-Western World. Vol. 15). Harrassowitz, Wiesbaden 2009.
- Transcontinental Links in the History of Non-Western Christianity. (Transkontinentale Beziehungen in der Geschichte des Außereuropäischen Christentums.) (Studies in the History of Christianity in the Non-Western World. Vol. 6). Harrassowitz, Wiesbaden 2002.
- ′Christen und Gewürze′. Konfrontation und Interaktion kolonialer und indigener Christentumsvarianten. (Studies in the History of Christianity in the Non-Western World Bd. 1). Vandenhoeck und Ruprecht, Göttingen 1998.
- Spuren der alten Liebe. Studien zum Kirchenbegriff des Basilius von Caesarea. (Paradosis Bd. 32). Freiburg/Schweiz 1991.
- Die Polemik der Gnostiker gegen das kirchliche Christentum. Unter besonderer Berücksichtigung der Nag-Hammadi-Traktate "Apokalypse des Petrus" (NHC VII,3) und "Testimonium Veritatis" (NHC IX,3). (Nag Hammadi Studies XII), Leiden 1978.
- Hippolyt's Ketzerbekämpfung und Polemik gegen die Gnostiker. Eine tendenzkritische Untersuchung seiner "Refutatio omnium haeresium". (Göttinger Orientforschungen VI/4), Wiesbaden 1975.

== Book on Klaus Koschorke ==
- Mira Sonntag (Ed.), ‘Gurôbaru historî’ no naka no kirisutokyô: kindai Ajia no shuppan media to nettowâku keisei [Christianity in ‘Global History’: Print Media and Network Building in Modern Asia]. Tokyo, Shinkyo Shuppansha 2019.
- Special Issue: The "Munich School of World Christianity", Journal of World Christianity, Vol. 6, No. 1, 2016.
- Ciprian Burlacioiu, Adrian Hermann (Eds.), Veränderte Landkarten. Auf dem Weg zu einer polyzentrischen Geschichte des Weltchristentums. Festschrift für Klaus Koschorke zum 65. Geburtstag. Harrassowitz, Wiesbaden 2013, ISBN 978-3-447-06967-0.
