= Fulcrum (Anglican think tank) =

Church of England think tank

Fulcrum is a think tank based around the evangelical centre-ground of the Church of England. Formed in 2002, Fulcrum aims to renew the moderate centre of the evangelical tradition in the Church of England. Fulcrum is normally viewed as representative of the open evangelical tradition within the Church of England.

== History ==
Fulcrum was co-founded by Francis Bridger, Graham Kings and others in response to strong and extreme responses from some evangelical quarters of the Church of England to the appointment of Rowan Williams as Archbishop of Canterbury. In 2003 the first official meeting of Fulcrum took place and the appointments of Chair, vice-chairs, administrator and theological adviser were made.

The equivalent organization in the Episcopal Church of the USA is Covenant, an organization which aims to renew the centre of the Christian tradition in North America and particularly within Anglicanism.

== Purpose ==
A fulcrum is the point of balance in a pivot. Fulcrum chose this name because it seeks to renew the evangelical tradition at the centre of the Church of England. According to its website, "Fulcrum embraces an historic orthodoxy that is generous in spirit, confident in the contribution evangelicals can make to Anglicanism". In the current climate of uncertainty in the Anglican Communion, Fulcrum seeks to promote an unpolarised evangelicalism.

It has been described as a "moderate evangelical grouping [...] which was formed, really, in order to uphold the prohibition on gay sex but to welcome women priests".

== Publications ==
Fulcrum publishes articles regularly through its website on a wide range of issues that affect the Church of England.

Fulcrum does not publish a journal outside of its website, but the journal Anvil is representative of the constituency associated with Fulcrum.
