= David Seamands =

Methodist pastor (1922–2006)

David A. Seamands (February 6, 1922 – July 29, 2006), author, scholar, and evangelical renewal movement leader within the United Methodist Church, was born in India to Methodist missionary parents and spent much of his boyhood there. He graduated from Asbury University, Drew Theological Seminary and the Hartford Seminary Foundation. He also received honorary degrees from both Asbury University and Asbury Theological Seminary. He and his wife, Helen, served as United Methodist missionaries in India from 1946 until 1962.

== Background ==
Rather than pursue his Ph.D. in theology, David went to work as a missionary in India.

When Seamands returned to the United States in 1962, he was appointed as pastor of the Wilmore United Methodist Church where he served for 22 years. Tapes of his sermons were sent by the tens of thousands around the world, and free to hundreds of missionaries overseas. Additional tens of thousands of his tapes dealing with the subject of damaged emotions were circulated before his book, Healing for Damaged Emotions (1.1 million sold), was ever published. In all, Seamands' seven books have sold more than two million copies. He was active in the field of Christian counseling and was recognized as a pioneer of the field at the 1992 Congress of Christian Counseling where, together with James Dobson, Larry Crabb and Gary Collins, he received the special "Paraklesis" Award. He and Helen were active in the beginnings of the Marriage Enrichment and Engaged Discovery movements and led over 2200 couples through these special weekend experiences.

Upon his retirement from the local ministry in 1984, he taught pastoral care at Asbury Theological Seminary. From 1988 to 1992, he was appointed as the Dean of the Chapel at Asbury.

== Other works ==
Seamands was also a delegate to six General Conferences, beginning in 1976. At four of those he presented the minority report for the legislative section dealing with issues of human sexuality. He also was responsible for the founding of the Evangelical Missions Council. In 1983 The Mission Society for United Methodists was organized.

Just prior to his death, Seamands resigned from the Wilmore United Methodist Church, citing a complaint of sexual misconduct filed against him and apologizing for his abuse of the trust of those around him. At the time of his death, some 3 months later, he was undergoing a "one-year leave from all ministerial functions" as part of church-imposed discipline.

== Death ==
David Seamands died on July 31, 2006. He was 84.

== Bibliography ==
- Healing for damaged emotions (1981)
- Healing grace (1988)
- Healing of memories (1985)
- Putting away childish things (1982)
