= Jooseop Keum =

South Korean theologian (born 1967)

The Reverend Jooseop Keum
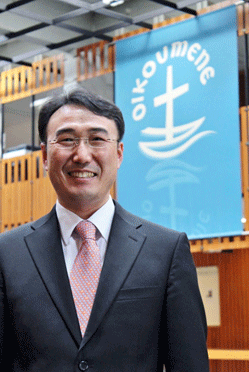
- Born: 1967 (age 58–59); South Korea
- Education: Presbyterian University and Theological Seminary; New College, Edinburgh
- Occupation: Theologian

Korean name
- Hangul: 금주섭
- RR: Geum Juseop
- MR: Kŭm Chusŏp

Jooseop Keum (Korean: 금주섭; born 1967) is a South Korean theologian and ecumenist, currently General Secretary of the Council for World Mission.

== Biography ==
Keum received his BA in Christian Education and MDiv from Presbyterian University and Theological Seminary, and his MTh and PhD at the Centre for the Study of World Christianity, University of Edinburgh. His PhD, completed in 2003, was on "Remnants and renewal: A history of Protestant Christianity in North Korea, with special reference to issues of Church and State, 1945–1994."

Ordained in the Presbyterian Church of Korea, Keum worked in the Council for World Mission as the Executive Secretary of the Mission Programme (2003–2007). He was Director of the Commission on World Mission and Evangelism of the World Council of Churches (2007–2018), during which he was also Editor of International Review of Mission. Since July 2021, Keum has been General Secretary of Council for World Mission.

== Honors ==
Known for his work in ecumenism and social justice, Keum received honorary doctorates from Debrecen Reformed Theological University in Hungary (September 2018), Lucian Blaga University of Sibiu (November 2018), and University of South Africa (May 2024).

In October 2026, Keum delivered the prestigious Cunningham Lectures in his alma mater, New College, Edinburgh, on the theme "What Does It Mean to Be Human? Slavery, Artificial Intelligence, Creation, and Mission."

== Selected works ==
- Keum, Jooseop (2003). Remnants and renewal: a history of Protestant Christianity in North Korea, with special reference to issues of Church and State, 1945–1994 (PhD thesis). University of Edinburgh.
- Keum, Jooseop, ed. (2012). Together Towards Life: Mission and Evangelism in Changing Landscapes. Geneva: World Council of Churches.
- Keum, Jooseop (2016). "Korean War: The Origin of the Axis of Evil in the Korean Peninsula". In Kim, Sebastian C. H.; Kollontai, Pauline; Hoyland, Greg (eds.). Peace and Reconciliation: In Search of Shared Identity. Routledge. pp. 109–132. ISBN 978-1-317-08290-3.
- Ross, Ken; Keum, Jooseop; Avtzi, Kyriaki, eds. (2016). Ecumenical Missiology: Changing Landscapes and New Conceptions of Mission. Regnum. ISBN 978-1-5064-7612-4.
- Jukko, Risto; Keum, Jooseop, eds. (2019). Moving in the Spirit: Report of the World Council of Churches Conference on World Mission and Evangelism 2019. Geneva: World Council of Churches.
