= Open evangelicalism =

Theological movement within Protestantism in the United Kingdom

Open evangelicalism is a term used in the United Kingdom to describe a theological movement found within evangelical Protestantism. An open evangelical attempts to uphold evangelical doctrines, morality, and spirituality, while also being inclusive of others. It is a term which is commonly used in the United Kingdom in reference to both individuals and institutions.

Open evangelicals describe their position as combining a traditional evangelical emphasis on the nature of scriptural authority, the teaching of the ecumenical creeds and other traditional doctrinal teachings, with an approach towards culture and other theological points of view which tends to be more inclusive than that taken by other evangelicals. In the Church of England, Graham Kings contrasts open evangelicals with conservative evangelicals and charismatic evangelicals. Another Anglican, Martyn Percy, contends that such a position is quite tenuous and, on divisive issues, either stands firm on a form of uncritical conservatism or risks being attacked as theological liberalism.

The think tank Fulcrum and the periodical Anvil were established as forums for open evangelicals within the Church of England. Prominent advocates of the open evangelical position include N. T. Wright, Graham Kings, Steven Croft, and Justin Welby. Among Anglican theological colleges, open evangelicalism is particularly strong within Ridley Hall, Cambridge, Cranmer Hall, Durham, and Wycliffe Hall, Oxford. Open evangelical churches include St. Mary's Islington, St Nicholas's Durham, Christ Church Clifton, Bath Abbey, Bradford Cathedral, St Paul's Braintree, St Barnabas Woodley, Jesus Church Forty Hill, All Saints West Ewell and St Peter's Shipley.

In the American Episcopal Church, corresponding or related terms may include broad church (pre-1934) and liberal evangelical (post-1934).

== See also ==
- Ecumenism
- Inclusivism
- Low church
- Paleo-orthodoxy
- Post-evangelicalism
