= Henry Martyn =

English Anglican priest and missionary in India and Persia

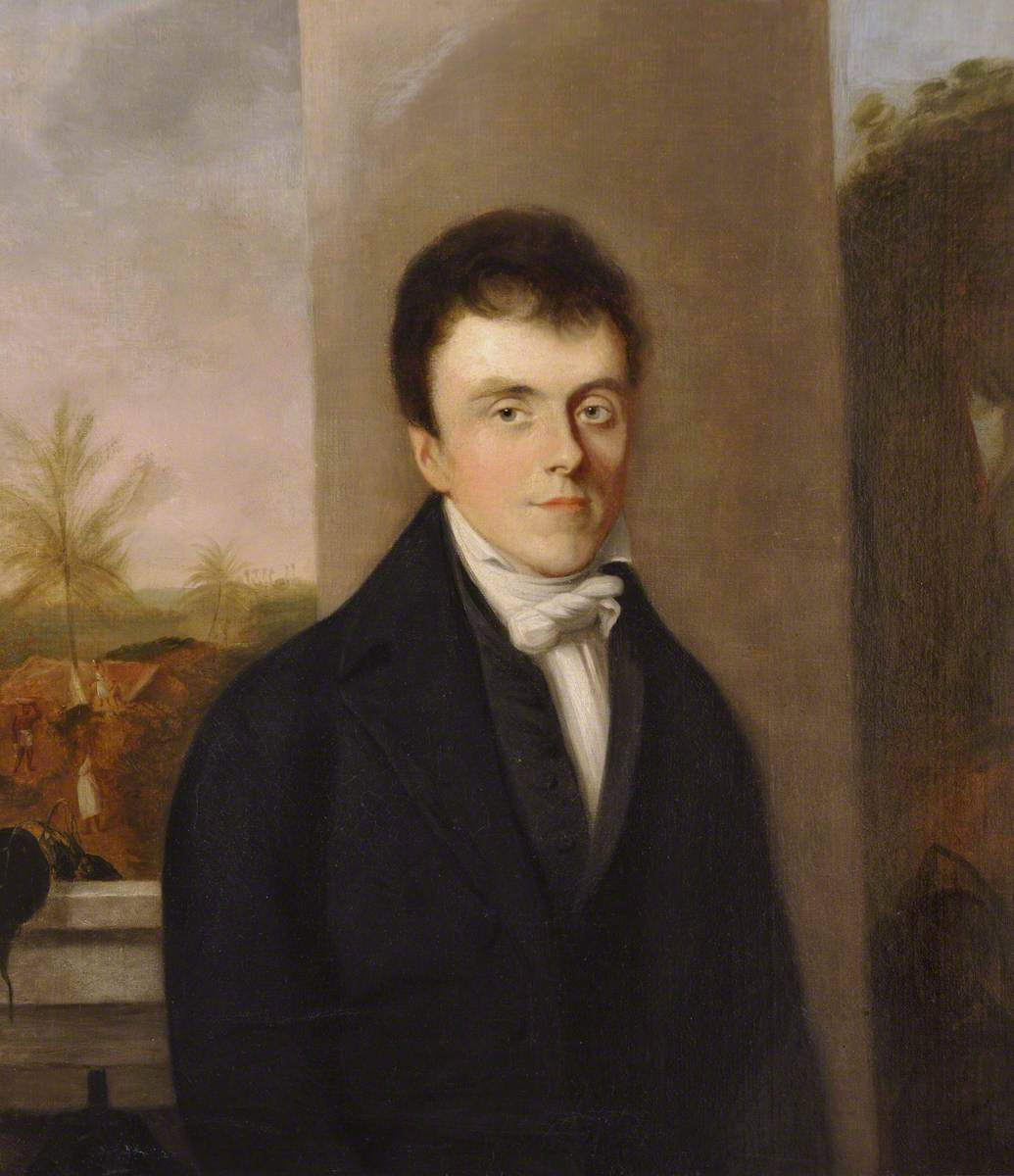

Missionary to India and Persia Translator of the Scriptures
- Born: 18 February 1781; Truro, Cornwall, England
- Died: 16 October 1812 (aged 31); Tokat, Ottoman Empire
- Venerated in: Anglican Communion
- Feast: 19 October

Henry Martyn (18 February 1781 – 16 October 1812) was an Anglican priest and missionary to the peoples of India and Persia. Born in Truro, Cornwall, he was educated at Truro Grammar School and St John's College, Cambridge. A chance encounter with Charles Simeon led him to become a missionary. He was ordained a priest in the Church of England and became a chaplain for the British East India Company.

Martyn arrived in India in April 1806, where he preached and occupied himself in the study of linguistics. He translated the whole of the New Testament into Urdu, Persian and Judaeo-Persic. He also translated the Psalms into Persian and the Book of Common Prayer into Urdu. From India, he set out for Bushire, Shiraz, Isfahan, and Tabriz.

Martyn was seized with fever, and, though the plague was raging at Tokat, he was forced to stop there, unable to continue. On 16 October 1812, he died. He was remembered for his courage, selflessness, and his religious devotion. In parts of the Anglican Communion he is celebrated with a Lesser Festival on 19 October. Martyn's papers and private letters are held at the Cambridge Centre for Christianity Worldwide at Westminster College in Cambridge, England.

== Early life ==
Martyn was born in Truro, Cornwall, on 18 February 1781. His father, John Martyn, was a "captain" or mine-agent at Gwennap. As a boy, he was educated at Truro grammar school under Dr. Cardew and he entered St John's College, Cambridge, in the autumn of 1797, and was senior wrangler and first Smith's prizeman in 1801. In 1802, he was chosen as a fellow of his college.

He had intended to go to the bar, but in the October term of 1802 he heard Charles Simeon speaking of the good done in India by a single missionary, William Carey, and some time afterwards he read the life of David Brainerd, a missionary to the Native Americans. He resolved, accordingly, to become a missionary himself. On 22 October 1803, he was ordained deacon at Ely, and afterwards priest, and served as Simeon's curate at Holy Trinity Church, Cambridge, taking charge of the Cambridgeshire parish of Lolworth.

== Missionary work ==
Martyn wanted to offer his services to the Church Missionary Society, when a financial disaster in Cornwall deprived him and his unmarried sister of the income their father had left for them. It was necessary for Martyn to earn an income that would support his sister as well as himself. He accordingly obtained a chaplaincy under the British East India Company and left for India on 5 July 1805. On his voyage to the East, Martyn happened to be present at the British conquest of the Cape Colony on 8 January 1806. He spent that day tending to the dying soldiers and was distressed by seeing the horrors of war. He would come away feeling that it was Britain's destiny to convert, not colonize, the world. In his diary Martyn wrote that he hoped England would not remain 'proud and ungodly' at home while waging war abroad, but would instead send church ministers to spread the gospel.

=== India ===
Martyn arrived in India in April 1806, and for some months he was stationed at Aldeen, near Serampur. In October 1806, he proceeded to Dinapur, where he was soon able to conduct worship among the locals in the vernacular, and established schools. In April 1809, he was transferred to Cawnpore, where he preached to British and Indians in his own compound, in spite of interruptions and threats from local non-Christians.

He occupied himself in linguistic study, and had already, during his residence at Dinapur, been engaged in revising the sheets of his Hindustani version of the New Testament. He now translated the whole of the New Testament into Urdu also, and into Persian twice. His work for the Persian Bible included translating the Psalms into Persian, the Gospels into Judaeo-Persic, and the Book of Common Prayer into Urdu, in spite of ill-health and "the pride, pedantry and fury of his chief munshi Sabat." Ordered by the doctors to take a sea voyage, he obtained leave to go to Persia and correct his Persian New Testament. From there, he wanted to go to Arabia, and there compose an Arabic version. On 1 October 1810, having seen his work at Cawnpore rewarded on the previous day by the opening of a church, he left for Calcutta, from where he sailed on 7 January 1811 for Bombay. The ship reached port on his thirtieth birthday.

== Final voyage and death ==
From Bombay he set out for Bushire, bearing letters from Sir John Malcolm to men of position there, as also at Shiraz and Isfahan. After an exhausting journey from the coast he reached Shiraz, and was soon plunged into discussion with the disputants of all classes, "Sufi, Muslim, Jew, and Jewish Muslim, even Armenian, all anxious to test their powers of argument with the first English priest who had visited them." He next travelled to Tabriz to attempt to present the Shah with his translation of the New Testament, which proved unsuccessful. Sir Gore Ouseley, the British ambassador to the Shah, was unable to bring about a meeting, but did deliver the manuscript. Although Martyn could not present the Bible in person, the Shah later wrote the ambassador a letter of thanks praising the quality of the translation and noting its clarity and simplicity.

At this time, he was seized with fever, and after a temporary recovery, had to seek a change of climate. He set off for Constantinople, where he intended to return to England to regain his strength and recruit help for the missions in India. On 12 September 1812, he started with two Armenian servants and crossed the Aras River. Urged on from place to place by their Tatar guide, they rode from Tabriz to Erivan, from Erivan to Kars, and from Kars to Erzurum. They departed Erzurum and though the plague was raging at Tokat, he was forced to stop there, unable to continue. He wrote his final journal entry on 6 October. It read, in part:

Oh! when shall time give place to eternity? When shall appear that new heaven and new earth wherein dwelleth righteousness? There, there shall in no wise enter in any thing that defileth: none of that wickedness which has made men worse than wild beasts, none of those corruptions which add still more to the miseries of mortality, shall be seen or heard of any more.

— Wilberforce 1837

On 16 October 1812 he died and was given a Christian burial by Armenian clergy.

== Legacy ==
His devotion to his tasks won him much admiration in Great Britain and he was the hero of a number of literary publications. Thomas Babington Macaulay's Epitaph, composed early in 1813, testified to the impression made by his career:

Here Martyn lies. In Manhood's early bloom
The Christian Hero finds a Pagan tomb.
Religion, sorrowing o'er her favourite son,
Points to the glorious trophies that he won.
Eternal trophies! not with carnage red,
Not stained with tears by hapless captives shed,
But trophies of the Cross! for that dear name,
Through every form of danger, death, and shame,
Onward he journeyed to a happier shore,
Where danger, death, and shame assault no more.

An institution was established in his name in India, called the Henry Martyn Institute: An Interfaith Centre for Reconciliation and Research, Hyderabad, India. John McManners wrote in his Oxford Illustrated History of Christianity that Martyn was a man remembered for his courage, selflessness and his religious devotion. Henry Martyn is honoured in the Church of England and in the Episcopal Church on 19 October.

In 1881, on the centennial of Martyn's birth, a trust was created in his name for the purpose of constructing a hall for a library and a place for public lecture on missions. The Henry Martyn Library opened in the Hall in 1898, and there it remained as a small collection of missionary biographies and other books until 1995. The evolution of the Henry Martyn Library into the present Henry Martyn Centre began in 1992, when Canon Graham Kings was appointed as the first Henry Martyn Lecturer in Missiology in the Cambridge Theological Federation. In 2014 the Henry Martyn Centre was renamed the Cambridge Centre for Christianity Worldwide.

== See also ==
- Cambridge Centre for Christianity Worldwide
- Henry Martyn Hall, Cambridge, built 1887
- Saints in Anglicanism
- Church Missionary Society in India
- List of Protestant missionaries in India
- John Gilchrist (linguist)
- James Hawkes (missionary)
- Constance E. Padwick (biographer)
