= Brian Stanley (historian) =

British historian

- Occupation: Scholar of missions history
- Known for: History of world Christianity

Academic background
- Education: University of Cambridge

Academic work
- Discipline: Missions study, Church history
- Institutions: University of Cambridge, University of Edinburgh

Brian Stanley is a British historian and Emeritus Professor of World Christianity at the University of Edinburgh, best known for his works in the history of Christian missions and world Christianity.

== Biography ==
He was educated at Whitgift School in Croydon, Surrey. He received his BA, MA, and PhD degrees in history from the University of Cambridge and has taught in theological colleges in London, Bristol, and Cambridge.

From 1996 to 2001, he was director of the Currents in World Christianity Project at the University of Cambridge. During his tenure in Cambridge he also served as the director of the Cambridge Centre for Christianity Worldwide (formerly the Henry Martyn Centre) and was a fellow of St Edmund's College. He joined the faculty at the University of Edinburgh in January 2009 and served as Director for the Centre for the Study of World Christianity at the School of Divinity in the University of Edinburgh until 2018. He is currently Emeritus Professor of World Christianity.

He has previously served as Editor-in-Chief of the academic journal Studies in World Christianity and part of the editorial board of The Journal of Ecclesiastical History. Along with Robert Eric Frykenberg, Stanley is co-editor of the Studies in the History of Christian Missions book series from the William B. Eerdmans Publishing Company.

== Bibliography ==
- Stanley, Brian (1990). The Bible and the Flag: Protestant Mission and British Imperialism in the 19th and 20th Centuries. Leicester: Apollos. ISBN 9780851114125.
- Stanley, Brian (1992). The History of the Baptist Missionary Society, 1792-1992. London: T&T Clark. ISBN 9780567096142.
- Stanley, Brian; Ward, Kevin, eds. (2000). The Church Mission Society and World Christianity 1799-1999. Grand Rapids, MI and Surrey: Eerdmans and Curzon Press. ISBN 9781136830969.
- Stanley, Brian, ed. (2001). Christian Missions and the Enlightenment. London and New York: Eerdmans and Curzon Press. ISBN 9781136865541.
- Stanley, Brian; Low, Alaine, eds. (2004). Missions, Nationalism, and the End of Empire. Grand Rapids, MI: Eerdmans. ISBN 9780802821164.
- Stanley, Brian; Gilley, Sheridan, eds. (2006). The Cambridge History of Christianity, vol 8, World Christianities, c. 1815 - c. 1914. Cambridge: Cambridge University Press. ISBN 9781139053952.
- Stanley, Brian (2009). The World Missionary Conference: Edinburgh 1910. Grand Rapids, MI: Eerdmans. ISBN 9780802863607.
- Stanley, Brian (2013). The Global Diffusion of Evangelicalism: The Age of Billy Graham and John Stott. Downers Grove, IL: Inter-Varsity Press. ISBN 9780830825851.
- Becker, Judith; Stanley, Brian, eds. (2013). Europe as the Other: External Perspectives on European Christianity. Göttingen: Vandenhoeck & Ruprecht. ISBN 9783525101315.
- Stanley, Brian (2018). Christianity in the Twentieth Century: A World History. Princeton, NJ: Princeton University Press. ISBN 9780691157108.
- Stanley, Brian (2025). Christianity and Empire Revisited. Leiden: Brill. ISBN 9789004738485.
