= Ian Randall =

British historian (born 1948)

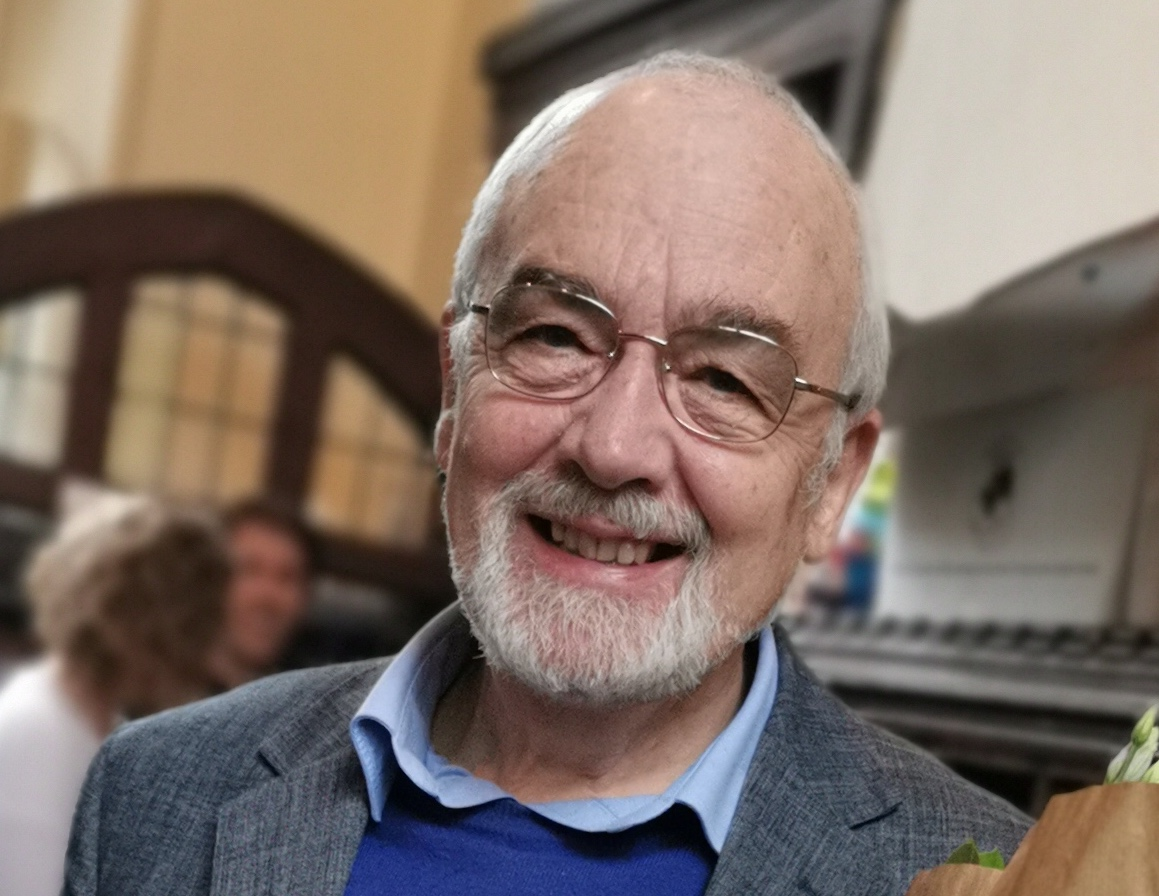
Rev Dr Ian Randall

Ian M. Randall FRHistS (born 9 January 1948) is a British historian who is best known for his works on the history of European evangelicalism and Protestant nonconformity. He is a research associate at the Cambridge Centre for Christianity Worldwide at Westminster College in Cambridge, England, and a Fellow of the Royal Historical Society. Randall also serves as a senior research fellow at Spurgeon's College in London and the International Baptist Theological Study Centre in Amsterdam.

== Biography ==
Randall was born in Scotland in the royal burgh of Wick, Caithness, on 9 January 1948. He studied history and economics at the University of Aberdeen and undertook theological studies at Regent's Park College at the University of Oxford in preparation for Baptist ministry. His subsequent masters work at London School of Theology followed by his doctoral studies at the University of Wales focused on the history of evangelical thought and spirituality. Randall's research on religion in Victorian England and interwar Britain challenged popular assumptions that portrayed evangelical Christianity as parochial and puritanical. He argued that evangelicals were broadminded advocates of denominational cooperation who were deeply concerned about issues of poverty, spirituality and social reform.

In 1992 Randall was appointed lecturer in Church history and spirituality at Spurgeon's College in London and became deputy principal of the school in 2003. During his tenure at Spurgeon's he also served as the director of Baptist and Anabaptist studies at the International Baptist Theological Seminary in the Czech Republic and divided his scholarly activities between London and Prague. He is recognized for his many contributions to Baptist studies in Britain and his varied works on evangelical history.

He is married to Janice and has two daughters, Ailsa and Moragh, and three grandchildren, Theo Randall, Iona and Ella.

== Selected works ==
- Evangelical Experiences: A Study in the Spirituality of English Evangelicalism, 1918–1939. Carlisle, UK: Paternoster, 1999.
- Educating Evangelicalism: The Origins, Development and Impact of London Bible College. Carlisle, UK: Paternoster, 2000.
- Transforming Keswick. Carlisle, UK: Paternoster, 2000 (with Charles Price).
- One Body in Christ: The History and Significance of the Evangelical Alliance. Carlisle, UK: Paternoster, 2003 (with David Hilborn).
- More than a Methodist: The Life and Ministry of Donald English. Carlisle, UK: Paternoster, 2003 (with Brian Hoare).
- Spirituality and Social Change: The Contribution of F. B. Meyer (1847–1929). Carlisle, UK: Paternoster Press, 2003.
- The English Baptists of the Twentieth Century. Didcot, UK: Baptist Historical Society, 2005.
- A School of the Prophets: 150 Years of Spurgeon's College. London, UK: Spurgeon's College, 2005.
- What a Friend We Have in Jesus. London, UK: Darton, Longman and Todd, 2005.
- Spiritual Revolution: The Story of OM. Milton Keynes, UK: Authentic, 2008.
- Communities of Conviction: Baptist Beginnings in Europe. Prague: European Baptist Federation, 2009.
- Rhythms of Revival. Milton Keynes, UK: Paternoster Press, 2010.
- A Christian Peace Experiment: The Bruderhof Community in Britain, 1933–1942. Eugene, OR: Cascade Books, 2018.
- Cambridge Students and Christianity Worldwide: Insights from the 1960s, Cambridge, UK: Cambridge Centre for Christianity Worldwide, 2019.
