= Maxie Dunnam =

Maxie D. Dunnam
- Born: Deemer, Mississippi, US
- Title: President Emeritus of Asbury Theological Seminary
- Awards: World Methodist Council Chair of Honor

Academic background
- Education: University of Southern Mississippi, Emory University
- Alma mater: Asbury Theological Seminary (DD)
- Thesis: (1977)

Academic work
- Discipline: New Testament Theology
- Sub-discipline: Evangelism
- Institutions: Asbury Theological Seminary
- Main interests: Evangelism
- Notable works: The Workbook of Living Prayer

Maxie D. Dunnam (born 12 August 1934) is a Global Methodist Church minister, evangelist, Bible commentator and writer. He is a past president of World Methodist Council. He is currently President Emeritus of Asbury Theological Seminary.

== Biography ==
Dunnam was born in Deemer, Mississippi (12 Aug. 1934). He was educated at the University of Southern Mississippi and gained a B.Sc. in 1955 then a M.Th. from Emory University in 1958. In 1977 he was conferred a D.D. from Asbury Theological Seminary.

Dunnam's extensive pastoral experience includes church planting, rural churches, and suburban and regional congregations in Mississippi, Georgia, California.

He created the Upper Room Cursillo that later became the Walk to Emmaus. Dunnam is one of the founders and leaders of the Confessing Movement within the United Methodist Church.He became the world editor of The Upper Room Fellowship.

From 1982 to 1994, he served twelve fruitful years as senior minister of the six-thousand-member Christ United Methodist Church in Memphis, Tennessee.

He served as president and chancellor of Asbury Theological Seminary in Wilmore, Kentucky, from 1994 through 2004. He is currently president emeritus there.

He has served as president of the World Methodist Council and is currently on its executive committee. He also served as chairman of the Methodist World Evangelism Committee. He is a director of the Board of Global Ministries of the United Methodist Church and a member of the executive committee of the Association of Theological Schools.

He has authored more than forty books, most notably The Workbook of Living Prayer, which sold over one million copies, Alive in Christ, This Is Christianity, and two volumes in The Communicator’s Commentary series. He is also well known for his radio series "Perceptions."

== Theology ==
Dunnam, along with many other visionaries within the church, were influenced by the teachings and leadership of the Rev. Sam S. Barefield Jr, Wesley Foundation Director at Mississippi Southern from 1950 - 1957. He is recognized as a representative of the Wesleyan-Arminian tradition.

== Awards ==
In October 1989, Dunnam was inducted into Evangelism's “Hall of Fame” by the Foundation for Evangelism as one of Forty Distinguished Evangelists of the Methodist world. In 1991 he received the World Methodist Council Chair of Honor. He received The Philip Award for Distinguished Service in Evangelism, presented by the National Association of United Methodist Evangelists in 1993.

== Publications ==
=== Books ===
- Dunnam, Maxie D.; Herbertson, Gary J.; Shostrom, Everett L. (1968). The Manipulator and the Church. Nashville, TN: Abingdon Press. ISBN 9780917851599. OCLC 448632.
- ——— (1973). Dancing at my Funeral. Atlanta: Forum House. ISBN 9780917851599. OCLC 749456.
- ——— (1974). The Workbook of Living Prayer. Nashville, TN: Upper Room. OCLC 3212047.
- ——— (1982). Alive in Christ: the Dynamic Process of Spiritual Formation. Nashville, TN: Abingdon Press. ISBN 978-0-6870-0993-0. OCLC 8034271.
- ——— (1982). Ogilvie, Lloyd J. (ed.). Galatians, Ephesians, Philippians, Colossians, Philemon. The Communicator's Commentary. Waco, TX: Word Books. ISBN 978-0-8499-0161-4. OCLC 18836906.
- ——— (1987). Ogilvie, Lloyd J. (ed.). Exodus. The Communicator's Commentary. Waco, TX: Word Books. ISBN 978-0-8499-0407-3. OCLC 18016223.
- ———; MacDonald, Gordon; McCullough, Donald W. (1992). Mastering Personal Growth. Sisters, OR: Christianity Today. ISBN 978-0-8807-0526-4. OCLC 26052947.
- ——— (1994). This is Christianity. Nashville, TN: Abingdon Press. ISBN 978-0-6870-0256-6. OCLC 30547611.
- ———; Malony, H. Newton (2003). Staying the Course: Supporting the Church's Position on Homosexuality. Nashville, TN: Abingdon Press. ISBN 978-0-6870-4534-1. OCLC 50912607.
- ———; Moore, Steve G. W.; Chilcote, Paul Wesley (2005). Cultivating a Thoughtful Faith. Nashville, TN: Abingdon Press. ISBN 978-0-6873-3303-5. OCLC 61211226.
- ——— (2008). Going on to salvation : a study of Wesleyan beliefs. Nashville, TN: Abingdon Press.

== Notes and references ==
=== Sources ===
- CT (1994). "Coalition, colleges name presidents". Christianity Today. 38 (5).
- CT (2003). "Briefs". Christianity Today. 47 (8).
- Dunnam, Maxie D. (1997). The Workbook on the 7 Deadly Sins. Nashville, TN: Upper Room Books.
- Confessingumc (2020). "Board of Directors". The Confessing Movement within The United Methodist Church.
- Confessingumc (2014). "Board of Directors". The Confessing Movement within The United Methodist Church. Archived from the original on 2014-06-26.
- Oden, Thomas C. (2001). "Answering Critics of An Evangelical Celebration". Christianity Today.
