= Asbury Theological Seminary =

American Methodist seminary

Coordinates: 37°51′44.34″N 84°39′39.56″W

- Motto: The Whole Bible for the Whole World.
- Type: Seminary
- Established: 1923; 103 years ago
- Endowment: $217.3 million (2025)
- President: David F. Watson
- Students: 1,708
- Location: Wilmore, Kentucky, United States
- Campus: Exurban (Kentucky), Multiple Extension Sites, Online
- Website: www.asburyseminary.edu

Asbury Theological Seminary is a Christian seminary in Wilmore, Kentucky based in the historical Wesleyan Methodist tradition. It is the largest seminary of the Wesleyan-Holiness movement. It is known for its advocacy of egalitarianism, giving equal status for men and women in ministerial roles and for ordination. It is accredited by the Commission on Colleges of the Southern Association of Colleges and Schools and the Association of Theological Schools in the United States and Canada (ATS).

== History ==
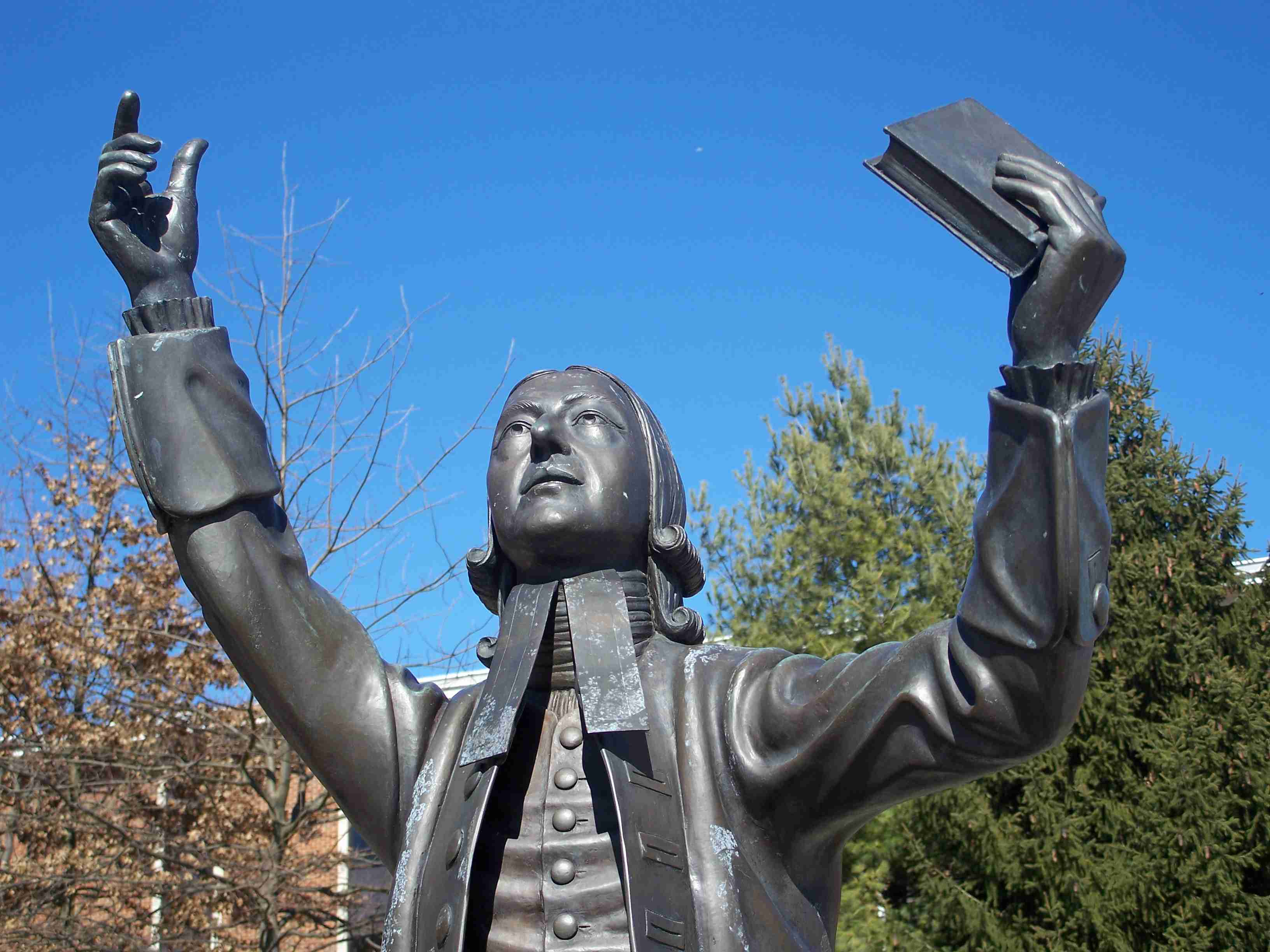
Statue of John Wesley at ATS - Wilmore Campus

Asbury Theological Seminary was founded in Wilmore, Kentucky, in 1923 by its first president, Holiness Methodist evangelist Henry Clay Morrison, who was at the time the president of Asbury College. In 1940, Asbury Seminary separated from the college in order to satisfy accreditation requirements. Because of the proximity of the two schools (across the street), similar names, and common theological heritage, many people confuse the relationship between the college and the seminary. While they are separate institutions, the schools maintain a collegial relationship.

Asbury Seminary has had nine presidents since its founding. In December 2023, the seminary announced that Timothy C. Tennent, the eighth president, would transition out of the presidency to be a Professor of World Christianity. In May 2024, the seminary's board of trustees named David J. Gyertson interim president starting July 1, 2024. The following year, the board elected David F. Watson as the next president effective July 1, 2025.

=== Presidents ===
Presidents of Asbury Theological Seminary
No.	Name	Term
1	Henry Clay Morrison	1923–1942
2	J.C. McPheeters	1942–1962
3	Frank Stanger	1962–1982
4	David McKenna	1982–1994
5	Maxie Dunnam	1994–2004
6	Jeff Greenway	2004–2006
7	Ellsworth Kalas	2006–2009
8	Timothy Tennent	2009–June 2024
–	David Gyertson (Note: Gyerston served as interim president for one year during the presidential search that resulted in Watson's selection.)	July 2024–June 2025
9	David F. Watson	July 2025–present

== Academics ==
The seminary is accredited by the Commission on Colleges of the Southern Association of Colleges and Schools to award master's and doctoral degrees. It is also accredited by the Association of Theological Schools in the United States and Canada and a member of Association for Biblical Higher Education.

Asbury Theological Seminary has four academic schools:

- School of Biblical Interpretation
- E. Stanley Jones School of World Mission and Evangelism
- School of Theology & Formation
- School of Counseling

In addition to the main campus in Wilmore, the seminary also offers courses through online learning and extension sites in Memphis, Tennessee, Tulsa, Oklahoma, Tampa, Florida, and Orlando, Florida.

== Notable faculty ==
- Bill T. Arnold — Paul S. Amos Professor of Old Testament Interpretation, editor of biblical commentary series, including the New International Commentary on the Old Testament (NICOT)
- Kenneth J. Collins — professor of Historical Theology and Wesley Studies
- Craig S. Keener — professor of New Testament, known for his expertise in Greco-Roman and Jewish sources
- John N. Oswalt — visiting distinguished professor of the Old Testament, involved with the NIV and NLT Bible translations, author of a major commentary on Isaiah
- Ben Witherington III — Jean R. Amos Professor of New Testament for Doctoral Studies, and prolific author

== Notable alumni ==
- Jacob DeShazer, a member of the Doolittle Raid, a prisoner of war in Japan, and then a missionary to Japan in the Free Methodist Church
- Darryl Fitzwater, bishop of the Missionary Diocese of All Saints in the Anglican Church in North America
- Jim Garlow, pastor of Skyline Church in San Diego
- Alfred W. Gwinn, former United Methodist Bishop of the North Carolina Annual Conference
- Stephen Hance, Anglican minister and Dean of Toronto Cathedral
- Joe Hilley, (class of 1984), New York Times bestselling author
- James W. Holsinger, M.Div., former chair of Board of Trustees, former member of the Board of Trustees, and nominated United States Surgeon General
- Marshall MacClellan, D.Min., suffragan bishop of the Jurisdiction of the Armed Forces and Chaplaincy
- Steve Murrell, President of Every Nation Churches & Ministries and founding pastor of Victory
- David Seamands, United Methodist pastor and writer
- Ted Strickland (class of 1967), 68th Governor of Ohio and former member of the United States House of Representatives.
