= Euan Cameron =

English professor

Euan Cameron is the Henry Luce III Professor of Reformation Church History at Union Theological Seminary. He has a D.Phil from the University of Oxford. His work focuses on the Reformation and religion in the Late Middle Ages.
