= Lamin Sanneh =

Gambian American scholar (1942–2019)

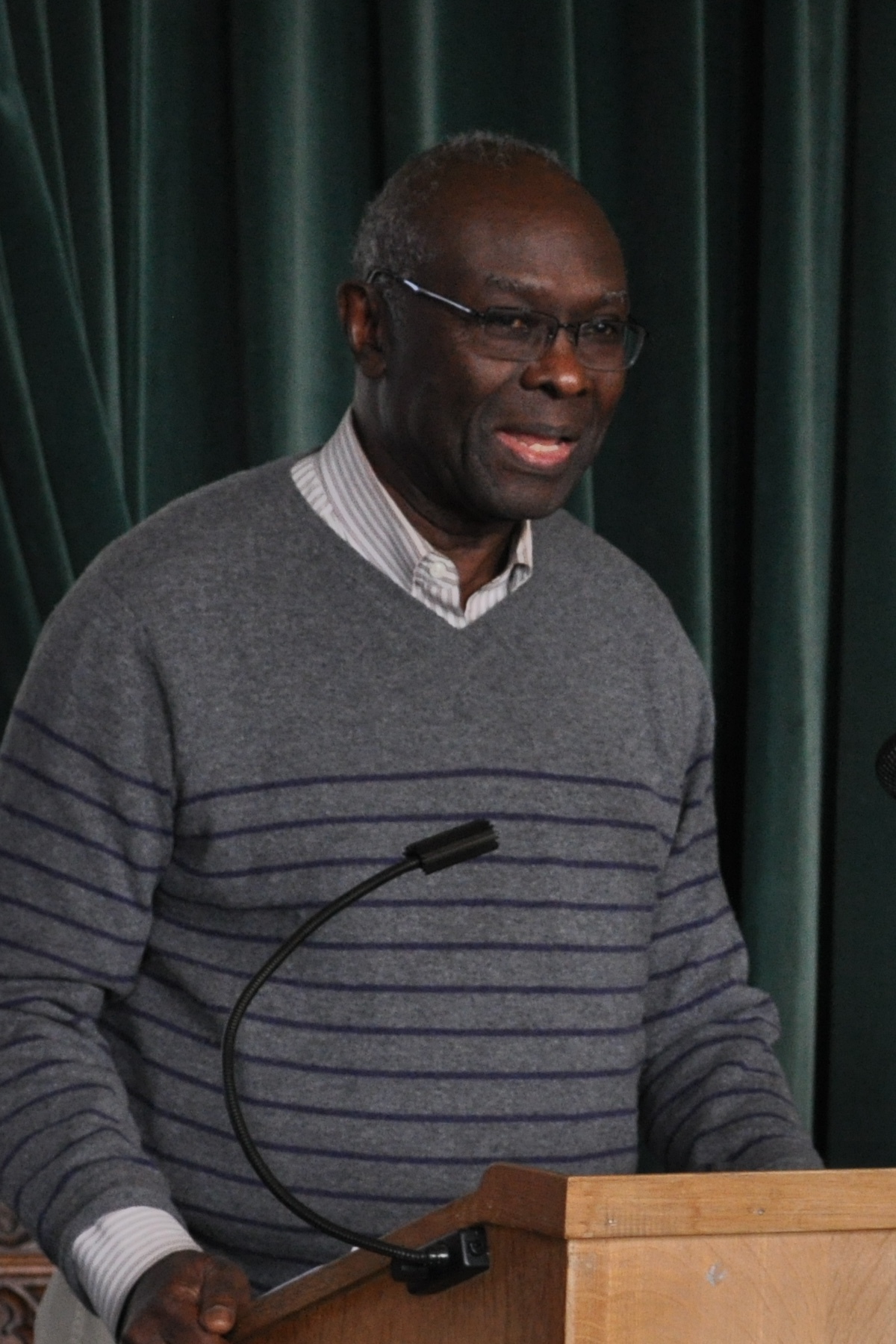
- Sanneh in 2014
- Born: May 24, 1942; Abuko, Gambia Colony and Protectorate
- Died: January 6, 2019 (aged 76); United States
- Occupations: Scholar of missions and religious studies
- Known for: History of African Christianity and a pioneer in the academic field of world Christianity
- Spouse: Sandra Sanneh

Academic work
- Discipline: Missiology, religious studies
- Institutions: University of Ghana, University of Aberdeen, Harvard Divinity School, Yale Divinity School

Lamin Sanneh (May 24, 1942 – January 6, 2019) was a Gambian American scholar who was the D. Willis James Professor of Missions and World Christianity at Yale Divinity School and Professor of History at Yale University.

== Biography ==
Sanneh was born and raised in The Gambia as part of an ancient African royal family, and was a naturalized United States citizen. After studying at the University of Birmingham and the Near East School of Theology, Beirut, he earned his doctorate in Islamic History at the University of London. Sanneh taught and worked at the University of Ghana (1975—1978), the University of Aberdeen (1978—1981), Harvard Center for the Study of World Religions (1981—1989), and at Yale Divinity School (1989—2019). He was an editor-at-large of The Christian Century, and served on the board of several other journals. Sanneh had honorary doctorates from University of Edinburgh and Liverpool Hope University.

He was a Commandeur de l'Ordre National du Lion, Senegal's highest national honor. He was a member of the Pontifical Commission of the Historical Sciences and of the Pontifical Commission on Religious Relations with Muslims. In 2018, a new institute was created in his name, the Sanneh Institute at the University of Ghana. The Overseas Ministry Study Center (OMSC) at Princeton Theological Seminary created a research grant named in honor of Sanneh.

Much of his scholarship related to the relationship between Christianity and Islam, especially in Africa and what he understood as "African Islam." Another major area of Sanneh's academic work was in the study of World Christianity. In his Translating the Message (1989), Sanneh wrote about the significance of the translation of the Christian message into mother-tongue languages in places like Africa and Asia. Instead of the dominant view that Christian mission primarily propagated "cosmopolitan values of an ascendant West," he argues, "The translation role of missionaries cast them as unwitting allies of mother-tongue speakers and as reluctant opponents of colonial domination." He continued to develop these reflections in his Disciples of All Nations (2008).

Sanneh suffered a stroke and died on January 6, 2019.

== Personal life. ==
Sanneh converted to Christianity from Islam and was a practicing Catholic. He was survived by his wife, Sandra Sanneh, a professor of isiZulu at Yale University, and their children Sia Sanneh, a senior attorney at the Equal Justice Initiative, and Kelefa Sanneh, staff writer for The New Yorker.

== Selected books ==
- West African Christianity: The Religious Impact. Maryknoll, NY: Orbis Books. 1983. ISBN 9780883447031.
- Translating the Message: The Missionary Impact on Culture. Maryknoll, NY: Orbis Books. 1989. ISBN 9780883443613.
- The Jakhanke Muslim Clerics: A Religious and Historical Study of Islam in Senegambia. Lanham, MD: University Press of America. 1989. ISBN 9780819174819.
- Encountering the West: Christianity and the Global Cultural Process: The African Dimension. Maryknoll, NY: Orbis Books. 1993. ISBN 9780883449295.
- Religion and the Variety of Culture: A Study in Origin and Practice. Valley Forge, PA: Trinity Press International. 1996. ISBN 9781563381669.
- Het Evangelie is Niet Los Verkrijgbaar: Het Christendom als Inculturatie-Beweging. Kampen, The Netherlands: Kok. 1996. ISBN 9789024279746.
- Piety and Power: Muslims and Christians in West Africa. Maryknoll, NY: Orbis Books. 1996. ISBN 9781570750908.
- The Crown and the Turban: Muslims and West African Pluralism. Boulder, CO: Westview Press. 1997. ISBN 9780813330594.
- Faith and Power: Christianity and Islam in "Secular" Britain. London: SPCK. 1998. ISBN 9780281051533. (with Lesslie Newbigin and Jenny Taylor)
- Abolitionists Abroad: American Blacks and the Making of Modern West Africa. Cambridge, MA: Harvard University Press. 2009. ISBN 978-0674043077.
- Whose Religion is Christianity?: The Gospel Beyond the West. Grand Rapids, MI: William B. Eerdmans Pub. Co. 2004. ISBN 0802821642. (Winner: Theologos Award for "Best General Interest Book 2004")
- The Changing Face of Christianity: Africa, the West, and the World. New York: Oxford University Press. 2005. ISBN 0195177274. (co-edited with Joel A. Carpenter)
- Disciples of all Nations: Pillars of World Christianity. New York: Oxford University Press. 2008. ISBN 9780195189605.
- Summoned from the Margin: Homecoming of an African. Grand Rapids, MI: William B. Eerdmans Pub. Co. 2012. ISBN 9780802867421.
- Beyond Jihad: The Pacifist Tradition in West African Islam. New York: Oxford University Press. 2016. ISBN 9780199351619.
- The Wiley Blackwell Companion to World Christianity. Hoboken, NJ: John Wiley & Sons. 2016. ISBN 9781118556047. (co-edited with Michael McClymond
