= Ellsworth Kalas =

J. Ellsworth Kalas
- Born: February 14, 1923
- Died: November 12, 2015 (aged 92)
- Title: President and a professor of Asbury Theological Seminary

Academic background
- Education: University of Wisconsin–Madison, Garrett Theological Seminary, University of Wisconsin–Madison, Harvard University

Academic work
- Discipline: Biblical studies
- Institutions: Asbury Theological Seminary
- Notable works: Christian Believer

J. Ellsworth Kalas (February 14, 1923 – November 12, 2015) was a president and a professor of Asbury Theological Seminary in Wilmore, Kentucky. He also served as pastor for 38 years in the Wisconsin and Ohio Conferences of the United Methodist Church and was associated for 5 years with the World Methodist Council.

== Education and career ==
Kalas obtained his Bachelor of Science at University of Wisconsin–Madison in 1951; his Bachelor of Divinity at Garrett Theological Seminary in 1954; and did additional graduate studies at University of Wisconsin–Madison (1954–1955), and Harvard University (1955–1956). Dr. Kalas also held honorary degrees from Lawrence University, Asbury Theological Seminary, and Kentucky Wesleyan College.

Kalas' tenure with Asbury began in 1993 and he had taught Preaching there since 2000. He was the author of multiple Bible Studies published by the United Methodist Publishing House as well as a groundbreaking study called "Christian Believer" which attempts to teach Methodist laity systematic theology.

His addition to the field of homiletics is the concept of the Biographical Sermon, teaching a doctrine or biblical concept through the story of a real person's life. Biographical preaching can model methods for dealing with suffering and pain by telling the story of an exemplar's struggle with suffering and pain.

== Death ==
Kalas died on November 12, 2015. He was 92, the same age as Asbury Seminary – both born in 1923.

== Works ==
Kalas authored over 35 different books and many additional published articles. As well as 13 adult study quarterlies for the United Methodist Publishing House.

=== Books ===
- Kalas, J. Ellsworth (1992). Parables from the Back Side: Bible stories with a twist. Nashville, TN: Abingdon Press. ISBN 978-0-687-30062-4. OCLC 24467259.
- ——— (1994). If Experience is Such a Good Teacher, Why do I keep repeating the course?. Nashville, TN: Dimensions for Living. ISBN 978-0-687-18650-1. OCLC 29468634.
- ——— (1995). Old Testament Stories from the Back Side. Nashville, TN: Abingdon Press. ISBN 978-0-687-00466-9. OCLC 32199231.
- ——— (1996). The Grand Sweep: 365 Days from Genesis Through Revelation. Nashville, TN: Abingdon Press. ISBN 978-0-687-72053-8.
- ——— (1998). The Ten Commandments from the Back Side. Nashville, TN: Abingdon Press. ISBN 978-0-687-00524-6. OCLC 37694194.
- ——— (2002). The Thirteen Apostles. Nashville, TN: Abingdon Press. ISBN 978-0-687-09721-0. OCLC 48038107.
- ——— (2003). Preaching from the Soul: Insistent Observations on the Sacred Art. Nashville, TN: Abingdon Press. ISBN 978-0-687-06630-8. OCLC 50942065.
- ——— (2004). Preaching about People: the power of biography. St. Louis, MO: Chalice Press. ISBN 978-0-827-23002-6. OCLC 55286280.
- ——— (2004). Preaching the Calendar: celebrating holidays and holy days. Louisville, KY: Westminster, John Knox Press. ISBN 978-0-664-22714-2. OCLC 53462180.
- ——— (2005). More Parables from the Back Side. Nashville, TN: Abingdon Press. ISBN 978-0-687-74041-3. OCLC 56730143.
- ——— (2005). Grace in a Tree Stump: Old Testament stories of God's love. Louisville, KY: Westminster, John Knox Press. ISBN 978-0-664-22900-9. OCLC 56413575.
- ——— (2006). Longing to Pray: how the Psalms teach us to talk with God. Nashville, TN: Abingdon Press. ISBN 978-0-687-49512-2. OCLC 62118269.
- ——— (2007). Strong Was Her Faith: Women of the New Testament. Nashville, TN: Abingdon Press. ISBN 978-0-687-64121-5. OCLC 71507217.
- ——— (2010). All Creation Sings: the voice of God in nature. Nashville, TN: Abingdon Press. ISBN 978-1-426-70791-9. OCLC 457160571.
- ——— (2011). Genesis. Immersion Bible Studies. Nashville, TN: Abingdon Press. ISBN 978-1-426-71623-2. OCLC 707887006.
- ——— (2011). Faith from the Back Side: a different take on what it means to believe. Back Side Series. Nashville, TN: Abingdon Press. ISBN 978-1-426-74173-9. OCLC 721883754.
- ——— (2012). Being United Methodist: What it Means Why it Matters. Nashville, TN: Abingdon Press. ISBN 978-1-4267-5234-6. OCLC 811964723.
- ——— (2013). I Love Growing Older, but I'll never grow old. Nashville, TN: Abingdon Press. ISBN 978-1-426-75592-7. OCLC 811964723.
- ——— (2014). Preaching in an Age of Distraction. Downers Grove, IL: IVP Books. ISBN 978-0-830-84110-3. OCLC 871219537.
- ——— (2014). Heroes, Rogues, and the Rest: lives that tell the story of the Bible. Nashville, TN: Abingdon Press. ISBN 978-1-426-77562-8. OCLC 859232121.
- ——— (2015). The Parables of Paul: the master of the metaphor. Nashville, TN: Abingdon Press. ISBN 9781630882532. OCLC 900867812.

=== Chapters ===
- ——— (2006). "The Quest for Effective Biblical Preaching". Incandescence: Light Shed through the Word. By Witherington III, Ben. Grand Rapids, MI: Eerdmans. pp. xvi-. ISBN 978-0-802-83208-5. OCLC 63703828.
