= Centre for the Study of World Christianity =

Research centre of the Edinburgh University School of Divinity

Coordinates: 55°56′58″N 3°11′43″W

- Former name: Centre for the Study of Christianity in the Non-Western World
- Established: 1982
- Field of research: World Christianity
- Directors: Alexander Chow and Emma Wild-Wood
- Location: Edinburgh, United Kingdom
- Affiliations: New College, University of Edinburgh
- Website: www.cswc.div.ed.ac.uk

The Centre for the Study of World Christianity (CSWC) is a research centre based in New College, the School of Divinity at the University of Edinburgh. It was founded in the University of Aberdeen by Andrew F. Walls as the Centre for the Study of Christianity in the Non-Western World in 1982, but later moved by Walls to the University of Edinburgh in 1986. Its current name was adopted in 2009. The centre is currently directed by Alexander Chow and Emma Wild-Wood.

== Research ==
The centre promotes historical, theological, and social scientific research in the field of World Christianity – broadly speaking, Christianity in Africa, Asia, Latin America, Oceania, and eastern Europe, as well as diasporic forms of non-Western Christianity emerging in contexts such as Western Europe and North America. Closely related to the centre is the peer-reviewed academic journal Studies in World Christianity, published three times a year. The centre is one of the main sponsors of the Yale-Edinburgh Group on the History of the Missionary Movement and World Christianity, and maintains its own research archive.

Some notable books produced by scholars affiliated with the Centre include:

- Adogame, Afeosemime U (2013). The African Christian Diaspora: New Currents and Emerging Trends in World Christianity. London: Bloomsbury. ISBN 978-1-4411-8858-8.
- Bediako, Kwame (1995). Christianity in Africa: The Renewal of a Non-Western Religion. Edinburgh: Edinburgh University Press. ISBN 978-1-57075-048-9.
- Chow, Alexander (2018). Chinese Public Theology: Generational Shifts and Confucian Imagination in Chinese Christianity. Oxford: Oxford University Press. ISBN 978-0-19-880869-5.
- Chow, Alexander and Emma Wild-Wood (Eds; 2020). Ecumenism and Independency in World Christianity Historical Studies in Honour of Brian Stanley. Leiden: Brill. ISBN 978-90-04-43754-8
- Cox, James L. (2014). The Invention of God in Indigenous Societies. Durham: Acumen. ISBN 978-1-84465-754-4.
- Stanley, Brian (2009). The World Missionary Conference, Edinburgh 1910. Grand Rapids, MI: William B. Eerdmans. ISBN 978-0-8028-6360-7.
- ——— (2013). The Global Diffusion of Evangelicalism: The Age of Billy Graham and John Stott. Downers Grove, IL: Inter-Varsity Press. ISBN 978-1-84474-621-7.
- Walls, Andrew F. (1996). The Missionary Movement in Christian History: Studies in the Transmission of Faith. Maryknoll, NY: Orbis Books. ISBN 978-1-57075-059-5.
- ——— (2002). The Cross-Cultural Process in Christian History: Studies in the Transmission and Appropriation of Faith. Maryknoll, NY: Orbis Books. ISBN 978-1-57075-373-2.
- ——— (2017). Crossing Cultural Frontiers: Studies in the History of World Christianity. Maryknoll, NY: Orbis Books. ISBN 978-1-62698-258-1.

== Graduate Studies ==
As part of the School of Divinity, it offers a one-year MTh teaching program and a PhD research degree producing, by the first decade of the twenty first century, 129 MTh and 65 PhD theses. Some of the centre's notable alumni include:

- Siga Arles, director of the Centre for Contemporary Christianity, Bangalore, India
- Kwame Bediako, former rector for the Afroki-Christaller Institute for Theology, Mission and Culture, Akropong, Ghana
- Jonathan Bonk, executive director emeritus of the Overseas Ministries Study Center in New Haven, Connecticut, U.S.A.
- James L. Cox, honorary professorial fellow of religious studies, School of Divinity, University of Edinburgh, Scotland
- Edward Fasholé-Luke, professor, Fourah Bay College, Sierra Leone
- Jehu Hanciles, D.W. and Ruth Brooks Associate Professor of World Christianity, Candler School of Theology, Emory University, Atlanta, Georgia, U.S.
- Jooseop Keum, secretary, Council for World Mission and Evangelism, World Council of Churches
- Esther Mombo, deputy vice-chancellor, St. Paul's University, Limuru, Kenya
- Cyril Okorocha, Anglican bishop of Owerri Diocese in Nigeria
- David A. Shank, founder of Group for Religious and Biblical Studies, Blokhosso-Abidjan in Côte d'Ivoire
- Diane Stinton, dean of students and associate professor of mission studies, Regent College, Vancouver, Canada
- Godwin Tasie, professor of Church history, University of Jos, Nigeria
- Timothy Tennent, president of Asbury Theological Seminary, Wilmore, Kentucky, U.S.

== Sources ==
- Stanley, Brian (2011). "Founding the Centre for the Study of Christianity in the Non-Western World". In Burrows, William R.; Gornik, Mark R.; McLean, Janice A. (eds.). Understanding World Christianity: The Vision and Work of Andrew F. Walls. Orbis Books. pp. 51–59. ISBN 978-1-60833-021-8.
