= Andrew Walls =

British historian of missions (1928–2021)

Andrew Walls OBE
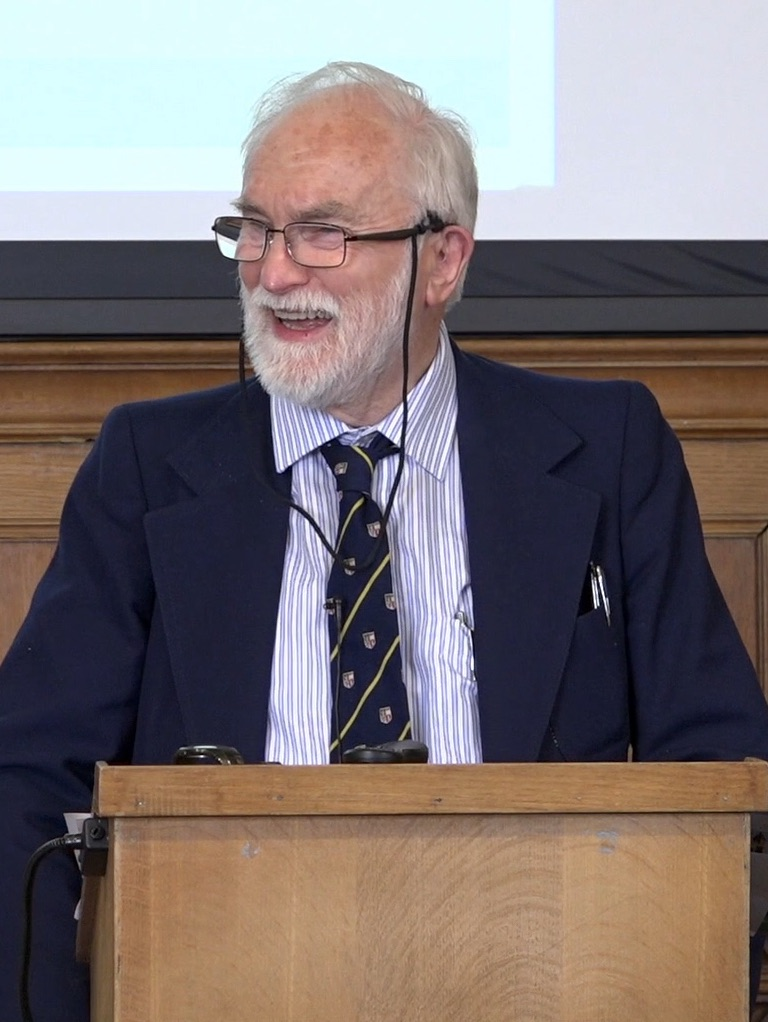
- Walls in 2016
- Born: Andrew Finlay Walls; 21 April 1928; New Milton, England
- Died: 12 August 2021 (aged 93); Aberdeen, Scotland
- Occupations: Scholar of missions and religious studies
- Known for: History of the African church and a pioneer in the academic field of World Christianity
- Spouse(s): Doreen (née Harden), Ingrid (née Reneau)

Academic background
- Education: Exeter College, Oxford
- Doctoral advisor: Frank Leslie Cross

Academic work
- Discipline: Missiology, religious studies
- Institutions: Fourah Bay College, University of Edinburgh, Liverpool Hope University

Andrew Finlay Walls OBE (21 April 1928 – 12 August 2021) was a British historian of missions, best known for his pioneering studies of the history of the African church and a pioneer in the academic field of World Christianity.

== Biography ==
Walls was born in 1928 in New Milton, England. He studied theology at Exeter College, Oxford, receiving a first-class degree in 1948, and completed his graduate studies in the early Church in 1956 under the patristics scholar Frank Leslie Cross.

He taught at Fourah Bay College, Sierra Leone (1957–62) and the University of Nigeria, Nsukka (1962–65). He was later appointed to a post in ecclesiastical history in the University of Aberdeen in 1966, before being the first head of the Department of Religious studies in the University of Aberdeen (1970). He would subsequently move to the University of Edinburgh in 1986. Before his death, he was Professor of the History of Mission at Liverpool Hope University, Honorary Professor at the University of Edinburgh, Research Professor at Africa International University's Center for World Christianity, and Professor Emeritus at the Akrofi-Christaller Institute of Theology, Mission and Culture.

Walls established the Journal of Religion in Africa and the Bulletin of the Scottish Institute of Missionary Studies, both in 1967. He also founded the Centre for the Study of Christianity in the Non-Western World (now known as the Centre for the Study of World Christianity), first at the University of Aberdeen in 1982, before moving it to the University of Edinburgh in 1987, a year after he moved to Edinburgh.

Walls was also active in public service. He was a city councilor for Aberdeen and ran for Parliament in 1970 as the Labour candidate for the Banffshire constituency. Due to his engagement in the arts and service as chair of the Council for Museums and Galleries in Scotland, Walls received an Order of the British Empire in 1987.

With his late wife Doreen Harden (1919–2009), whom he married in 1953, they have two children, Christine and Andrew (an immunopharmacologist at the University of Southampton). After Doreen's death in 2009, he married Ingrid Reneau in 2012, a Research Fellow with the Presbyterian Mission Agency.

Walls received an honorary degree of Doctor of Divinity from the University of Aberdeen in 1993, followed by a second one from the University of Edinburgh in 2018, in recognition of his scholarly contributions to the study of Christianity in Africa and the non-Western world.

Walls died on 12 August 2021 in Aberdeen after a period of hospitalisation. He was part of Aberdeen Methodist Church for over 50 years, and was active as a preacher through the North of Scotland Mission Circuit. After his death, scholars and former students from Africa, Asia, Europe, and the Americas paid tribute to Walls's ground-breaking scholarship and generous personal support.

== World Christianity ==
Walls' most significant observations have concerned the geographical trends in Christianity in the 20th and 21st centuries, especially in terms of expansion in Africa, in what is generally termed World Christianity. Historian Lamin Sanneh commented that he was 'one of the few scholars who saw that African Christianity was not just an exotic, curious phenomenon in an obscure part of the world, but that African Christianity might be the shape of things to come'. His pioneering research led the magazine Christianity Today to describe him in 2007 as 'a historian ahead of his time' and 'the most important person you don't know'.

Liverpool Hope University has a research centre named in honour of him, which encourages and supports research in the field of African and Asian Christianity.

== Religious studies ==
Although he is more well known for his work in Christianity, Walls has also been a significant pioneer in shaping the field of religious studies as it is taught in universities of Scotland. When he first returned to Scotland, Walls taught Ecclesiastical History in the University of Aberdeen in 1966. However, he recognised that the Faculty of Divinity in Aberdeen did not allow for a sufficient global perspective of religion, and founded the Department of Religious studies outside the Faculty of Divinity in 1970.

Significantly, Walls' work in Aberdeen would establish the first department of Religious Studies in Scotland. In the mid-1970s, the department would be known for emphasising work in the study of what was then called 'primal religions'. Moreover, his vision for a global perspective of religion allowed for Walls to attract a number of significant members of staff and students who were interested in religions of the non-Western world. It would also be in this new department that the original Centre for the Study of Christianity in the Non-Western World was established, before eventually being relocated to the University of Edinburgh in 1987.

== Works ==
=== Books ===
- Walls, Andrew Finlay (1996). The Missionary Movement in Christian History. Maryknoll, NY: Orbis Books. ISBN 978-1-570-75059-5. OCLC 33948470.
- ——— (2002). The Cross-Cultural Process in Christian History: Studies in the Transmission and Appropriation of Faith. Maryknoll, NY: Orbis Books. ISBN 978-1-570-75373-2. OCLC 47237613.
- ———; Ross, Cathy (2008). Mission in the Twenty-First Century: exploring the five marks of global mission. Maryknoll, NY: Orbis Books. ISBN 978-1-570-75773-0. OCLC 173243828.
- ——— (2017). Crossing Cultural Frontiers: Studies in the History of World Christianity. Maryknoll, NY: Orbis Books. ISBN 978-1-62698-258-1.
- Walls, Andrew F. (2025). Gornik, Mark R. (ed.). Christian Conversion and Mission: A Brief Cultural History. Orbis. ISBN 9781626986176.

=== Edited ===
- ———; Shenk, Wilbert R., eds. (1990). Exploring New Religious Movements: essays in honour of Harold W. Turner. Elkhart, IN: Mission Focus. ISBN 978-1-877-73608-7. OCLC 22281800.
- ———; Fyfe, Christopher, eds. (1996). Christianity in Africa in the 1990s. Edinburgh: Centre of African Studies, University of Edinburgh. OCLC 35318556.

=== Select chapters and articles ===
- Walls, Andrew Finlay (1967). "Papias and Oral Tradition". Vigiliae Christianae. 21 (3): 137–140. doi:10.1163/157007267X00159.
- ——— (1959). "Introduction". The First Epistle General of Peter. Tyndale New Testament Commentaries. Tyndale Press. ISBN 978-0-851-11813-0. OCLC 978540.
- ——— (1995). "Christianity in the non-western world: a study in the serial nature of Christian expansion". Studies in World Christianity. 1 (1): 1–25. doi:10.3366/swc.1995.1.1.1.
- ——— (1996). "African Christianity in the History of Religions". Studies in World Christianity. 2 (2): 183–203. doi:10.3366/swc.1996.2.2.183.
- ——— (2004). "Converts or Proselytes? The Crisis over Conversion in the Early Church". International Bulletin of Missionary Research. 28 (1): 2–6. doi:10.1177/239693930402800101. S2CID 147809031.
- ——— (2005). "The cost of discipleship: the witness of the African church". Word & World. 25 (4): 433–443.
- ——— (2014). "Mission and Migration: The Diaspora Factor in Christian History.". In Chandler H. Im and Amos Yong (ed.). Global Diasporas and Mission. Regnum Edinburgh Centenary Series 23. Regnum. pp. 19–37. ISBN 978-1498209403.
- ——— (2015). "An Anthropology of Hope: Africa, Slavery, and Civilization in Nineteenth-Century Mission Thinking". International Bulletin of Missionary Research. 39 (4): 225–230. doi:10.1177/239693931503900417. S2CID 171362472.
- ——— (2016). "The Transmission of Christian Faith: A Reflection.". In Lamin Sanneh and Michael J. McClymond (eds). (ed.). The Wiley-Blackwell Companion to World Christianity. Wiley Blackwell Companions to Religion. Wiley-Blackwell. pp. 685–698, chapter 51. ISBN 978-1405153768.
- ——— (2016). "Eschatology and the Western Missionary Movement". Studies in World Christianity. 24 (3): 182–200. doi:10.3366/swc.2016.0155.
- ——— (2020). "'You are old, Father William': Generational Abrasiveness in the Missionary Movement". In Chow, Alexander; Wild-Wood, Emma (eds.). Ecumenism and Independency in World Christianity: Historical Studies in Honour of Brian Stanley. Leiden: Brill. pp. 162–176. ISBN 978-90-04-43753-1.
- ——— (2022). "The Break-up of Early World Christianity and the Great Ecumenical Failure". Studies in World Christianity. 28 (2): 156–168. doi:10.3366/swc.2022.0387. S2CID 249288593.

Full bibliography of works through 2011 can be found in William Burrows, Mark Gornik and Janice McLean (eds) Understanding World Christianity: The Vision and Work of Andrew F. Walls (Maryknoll, New York: Orbis Books, 2011).
