= World Christianity =

Christianity as a world religion

World Christianity or global Christianity has been defined both as a term that attempts to convey the global nature of the Christian religion and an academic field of study that encompasses analysis of the histories, practices, and discourses of Christianity as a world religion and its various forms as they are found on the six continents. However, the term often focuses on "non-Western Christianity" which "comprises (usually the exotic) instances of Christian faith in 'the global South', in Asia, Africa, and Latin America." It also includes Indigenous or diasporic forms of Christianity in the Caribbean, South America, Western Europe, and North America.

== History of the term ==

Countries by percentage of Protestant Christians in 1938 and 2010. Pentecostal and Evangelical denominations within Protestantism fueled much of the global growth of Christianity in Latin America, the Caribbean, Oceania, and Sub-Saharan Africa.

The term world Christianity can first be found in the writings of Francis John McConnell in 1929 and Henry P. Van Dusen in 1947. Van Dusen was also instrumental in establishing the Henry W. Luce Visiting Professorship in World Christianity at Union Theological Seminary in 1945, with Francis C. M. Wei invited as its first incumbent. The term would likewise be used by the American historian and Baptist missionary Kenneth Scott Latourette, Professor of the History of Christianity at Yale Divinity School, to speak of the "World Christian Fellowship" and "World Christian Community". For these individuals, world Christianity was meant to promote the idea of Christian missions and ecumenical unity. However, after the end of World War II, as Christian missions ended in many countries, such as North Korea and China, and parts of Asia and Africa shifted due to decolonization and national independence, these aspects of world Christianity were largely lost.

The current usage of the term puts much less emphasis in missions and ecumenism. A number of historians have noted a twentieth-century "global shift" in Christianity, from a religion largely found in Europe and the Americas to one which is found in the Global South and Third World countries. Hence, world Christianity has more recently been used to describe the diversity and the multiplicity of Christianity across its two-thousand-year history.

Another term that is often used as analogous to world Christianity is the term global Christianity. However, scholars such as Lamin Sanneh have argued that global Christianity refers to a Eurocentric understanding of Christianity that emphasizes the replication of Christian forms and patterns in Europe, whereas world Christianity refers to the multiplicity of Indigenous responses to the Christian gospel. Philip Jenkins and Graham Joseph Hill contend that Sanneh's distinction between world Christianity and global Christianity is artificial and unnecessary.

== Notable figures ==
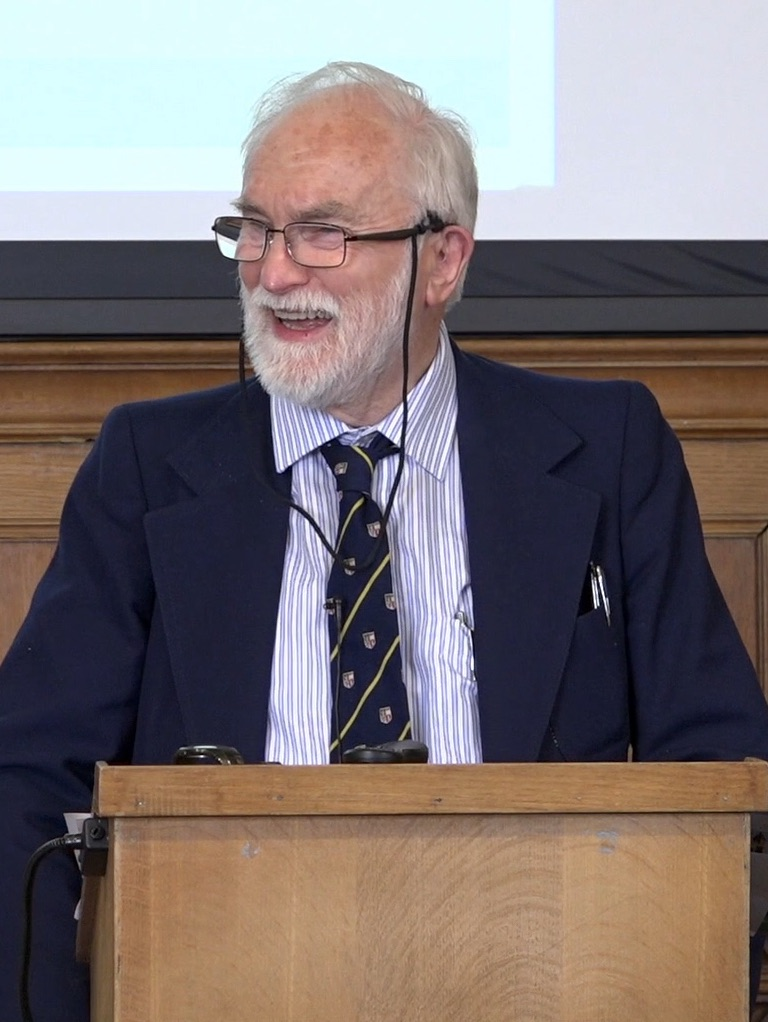
Andrew Walls, a key pioneer in the field of World Christianity

Some notable figures in the academic study of world Christianity include Andrew Walls, Lamin Sanneh, and Brian Stanley, all three of whom are associated with the "Yale-Edinburgh Group on the History of the Missionary Movement and World Christianity". Dana L. Robert has pointed out that the Yale-Edinburgh conference is responsible for creating the current academic discourse in World Christianity.

Other historians have offered their own takes on World Christianity. For instance, Klaus Koschorke has emphasized the comparative study of Christianity, highlight the polycentric structure of the religion and the South-South connections that underscore the developments of Christianity outside the West.

A growing number of theologians who have been engaging the field of world Christianity from the discipline of systematic theology, ecclesiology, and missiology. Some examples of this include the Pentecostal Veli-Matti Kärkkäinen, Catholic Peter C. Phan, and the Baptist Graham Joseph Hill.

== See also ==
- Acculturation
- Afro-Brazilian religions
- Cultural assimilation
- European colonization of the Americas
  - Atlantic slave trade
  - Canadian Indian residential school system
  - Catholic Church and the Age of Discovery
  - Jesuit missions in North America
  - Native American people and Mormonism
  - Puritan migration to New England (1620–1640)
  - Valladolid debate
- Inculturation
- Indigenous church mission theory
- Intercultural theology
- Latin American liberation theology
- Missiology
- Neo-charismatic movement
- Political influence of Evangelicalism in Latin America
- Prosperity theology
- Reverse mission
- Timeline of Christian missions
- Translations of the Bible
  - Bible translations into Native American languages
- Yale-Edinburgh Group
