= Episcopal Burying Ground and Chapel (Lexington, Kentucky) =

Historic cemetery in Kentucky, United States

- U.S. National Register of Historic Places
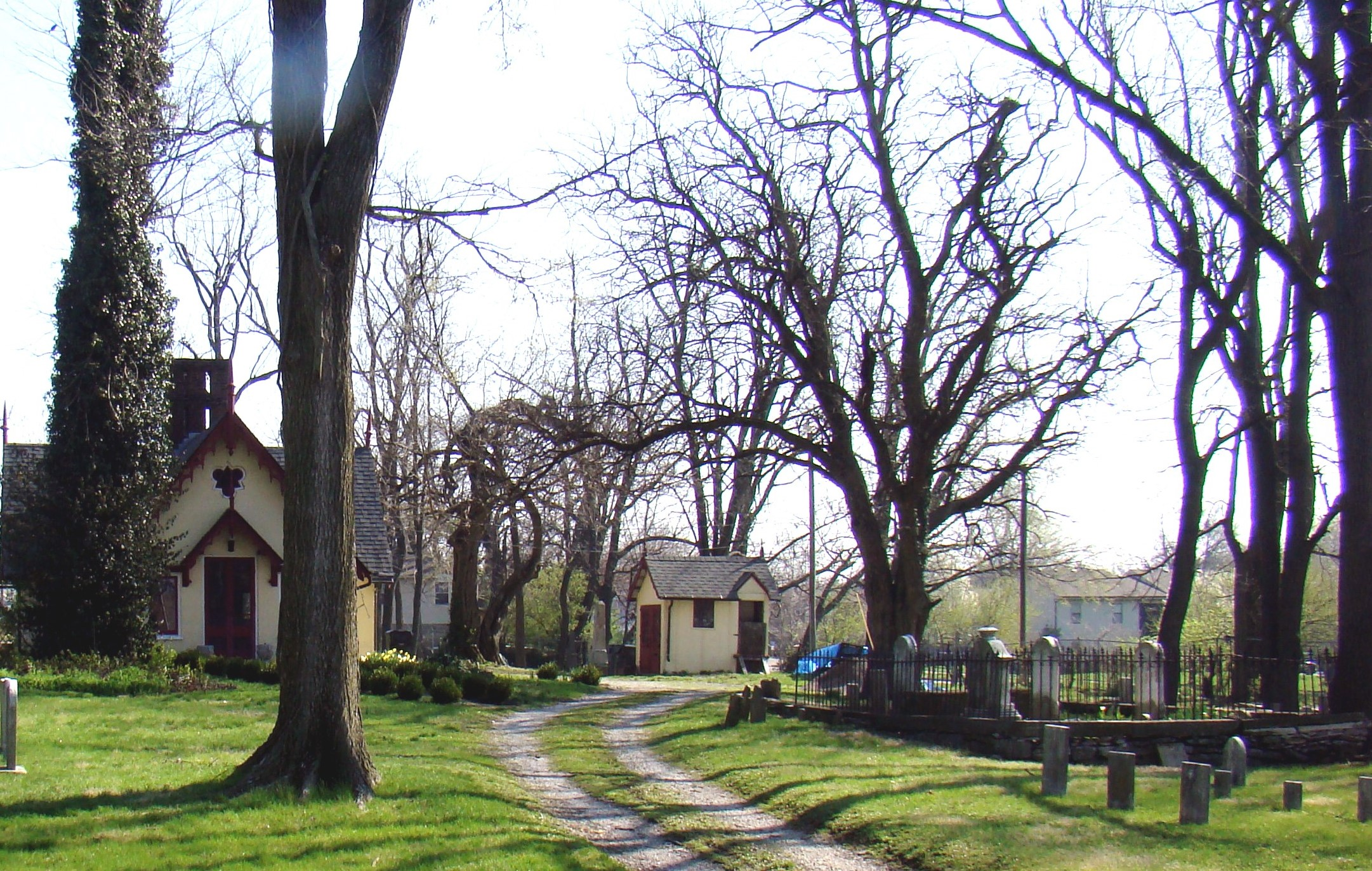

- Location within Kentucky Location within the United States
- Location: 251 E. 3rd St., Lexington, Kentucky
- Coordinates: 38°02′49″N 84°29′21″W
- Area: 2 acres (0.81 ha)
- Built: 1832, 1867
- Built by: G.D. Wilgus
- Architect: John McMurtry
- Architectural style: Gothic Revival, Carpenter's Gothic
- NRHP reference No.: 76000869
- Added to NRHP: June 24, 1976

The Episcopal Burying Ground and Chapel (also known as the Old Episcopal Burying Ground (OEBG)) is located at 251 East Third Street, in Lexington, Kentucky. The land was purchased in 1832 by Christ Church as a burial ground for its parishioners. The cemetery became extremely important during the 1833 cholera epidemic, during which one-third of the congregation died.

The burial ground also contains a small chapel that was built around 1867 and is thought to have been designed by notable Lexington architect John McMurtry. The small Carpenter Gothic chapel later became a sexton's cottage.

In 1976, the burying ground and former chapel were added to the National Register of Historic Places.

The only person of color buried in the OEBG, is Rev. London Ferrill, a former enslaved man who came to Kentucky in 1811 after the death of his enslaver. In 1821, he was ordained by the Elkhorn Baptist Association. Rev. Ferrell ministered to the black population of Lexington at the First African Church, now the First African Baptist Church. It was founded by Rev. Peter Durrett, also known as "Uncle Peter" and "Old Captain", an enslaved man of Rev. Joseph Craig, who came to Kentucky with the Baptist members of The Travelling Church from Upper Spotsylvania, Virginia in 1781.

The cemetery is not regularly open to the public, but private tours can be given by appointment.

== See also ==
- List of Registered Historic Places in Kentucky (Fayette County to Hopkins County)

== Additional sources ==
- The Advocate, The Diocese of Lexington, Summer 2008, p. 5
- Barr, Frances Swinford Keller and James D. Birchfield. Old Episcopal Burying Ground, Heritage Books, 2002; reprinted 2006.
