= History of Baptists in Kentucky =

The history of the Baptist movement in the United States state of Kentucky (and the area before it reached statehood) begins around 1775, when a few Baptist preachers visited from Virginia. Virginians John Taylor, Joseph Reading, and Lewis Lunsford all visited in 1779, but returned to Virginia. Baptists began to settle around 1781, the first Baptist congregation of 18 people being left by John Garrard. Rev. Lewis Craig led several hundred people of "The Travelling Church", including several preachers, to Gilbert's Creek from Spotsylvania County, Virginia, arriving the first week of December 1781. Cedar Fork Church was founded in 1782.

By 1785 there were 12 Baptist churches in Kentucky, formed into three Associations. The early preachers brought slaves with them, who were members of many congregations. The Elkhorn Association comprised the three churches to the north of the Kentucky River at Tate's Creek, Clear Creek, and South Elkhorn. The South Kentucky Association comprised the four churches south of the river at Rush Branch, Head of Boone's Creek, Gilbert's Creek, and Pottinger's Creek. The Salem Association comprised the four churches in Nelson County at Cox's Creek, Severn Valley, Cedar Creek, and Beargrass. The 12 pastors of the churches in 1785 are recorded in Asplund's Register as Lewis Craig, Joseph Bledsoe, George S. Smith, Richard Cave, James Smith, James Rucker, Robert Elkin, John Taylor, William Taylor, James Tanner, John Bailey, Joseph Craig, and Ambrose Dudley.

About 1790 the slaves Peter Durrett and his wife united their followers into the First African Church (later the First African Baptist Church) in Lexington, Kentucky. It is the oldest black Baptist church in Kentucky and the third oldest in the United States. Long active in the church, Durrett unsuccessfully sought ordination by the local association; they encouraged him to keep on with his work. By his death in 1823, Durrett led about 290 parishioners and they had bought their first properties as a church.

Rev. London Ferrill, the second pastor and a freed slave from Virginia, led the church to acceptance in the Elkhorn Association in 1824. In 31 years of leadership, he increased the congregation to 1,820 members, making it the largest church, black or white, in Kentucky. By 1861, the church had a congregation of 2,223 members.

The Elkhorn and South Kentucky Associations were, respectively, "Regular" and "Separate" Baptists, a doctrinal division that members and preachers had brought from Virginia. They attempted to follow the examples of the unification of the Regulars and Separates in Virginia (in 1787) and the Carolinas, first in 1789 and then again in 1793. In 1801, members agreed to terms, and the Elkhorn and South Kentucky Associations were unified. But, they separated again a year later, in 1802, into the North District and South District Associations, as the number of churches in the association had grown.

More Associations were formed in the same and subsequent years: the Bracken Association in 1798, the North Bend Association in 1802, the Long Run Association in 1803, and the Green River Association in 1800.

== See also ==
- Baptists in the United States
