= Bryan Station =

Frontier settlement in Kentucky

Coordinates: 38°4′33.12″N 84°24′55.05″W

Siege of Bryan Station
- Part of the American Revolutionary War
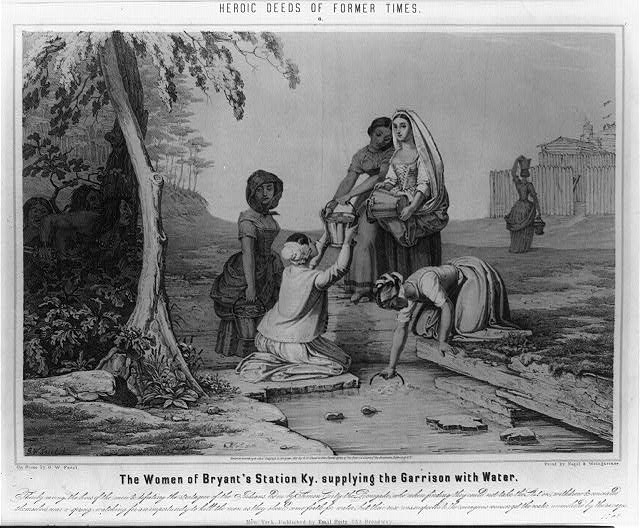
- Illustration of the siege
Date	August 15–17, 1782
Location	Lexington, Kentucky
Result	American victory

Belligerents
United States	Great Britain; Wyandot; Lenape; Shawnee

Commanders and leaders
Elijah Craig; John Craig	William Caldwell; Alexander McKee

Strength
90 settlers	400–500 provincials and Indians

Casualties and losses
4 killed 5 wounded	5 killed 2 wounded

Bryan Station (also Bryan's Station, and often misspelled Bryant's Station) was an early fortified settlement in Lexington, Kentucky. It was located on present-day Bryan Station Road, about three miles (5 km) northeast of New Circle Road, on the southern bank of Elkhorn Creek near Briar Hill Road. The settlement was established in the spring of 1776 by brothers Morgan, James, William (married to Mary Boone, sister of Daniel Boone), and Joseph Bryan, and brother-in-law William Grant (married to Elizabeth Jane "Betsy" Boone, also a sister of Daniel Boone), all from Yadkin River Valley, Rowan County, North Carolina. After a disastrous winter and attacks by Native Americans, all the Bryan family survivors abandoned the station and returned to the Yadkin River Valley in August 1780. Falling under the command of Elijah Craig, the remaining occupants withstood several American Indian attacks.

== History ==
Captain William Bryan (b. 1733) along with his brothers and a settler party from Rowan County, North Carolina, entered this frontier land in the spring of 1776 and began pitching the station. The site was located on high ground near the southern bank of Elkhorn creek. On this initial expedition, the party built a few cabins, planted sixty acres of farmland, and cleared many acres of the surrounding forest, which boasted a variety of blue ash, black walnut, honey locust, and sycamore trees. A spring flowed and meandered nearby, which served as the water supply for the station and would be center-place for much of the literature and history involving this fort. The parallelogram was distinctively elongated, with its width considerably shorter than its length, a design choice tailored to its inhabitants' desire to have a handsome amount of space in between the roughly forty or so cabins that would eventually be constructed.

The fort's establishment and command was originally led by Captain William Bryan until his death. William, who came from an influential Virginia land-owning family, declined an offer from the Royalist North Carolina government to build and lead a Tory militia as a commissioned Lieutenant Colonel. Aside from William's brother, Samuel, who did accept a comparable offer and would lead a battle against Rebels at Moore's Creek, most of the Bryans' loyalist convictions were not as strong; rather, they found their primary intrigue being in the frontier expeditions of William and Joseph's brother-in-law, Daniel Boone. However, the Bryans were far from self-avowed Patriots. As propriety citizens, they stood to benefit from certain privileges conferred by the Royal government, such as military protection. In this way, the Bryans thought an outright revolt could present precarious, if not unnecessary, difficulties. As a result, their lack of proclaimed allegiance to the American cause led to their official designation as Tories by the courts of the rebel-controlled Rowan County in 1778, further pressuring a full move out of the North Carolina county to Kentucky.

As the Revolutionary War escalated, the British increasingly incentivized and supported native tribes, particularly those north of the Ohio river, in driving out the influx of settlers into this land westward of the Appalachians. Tensions delayed the Bryan party's progress on the station for some time after their first expedition; however, in the spring of 1779, William, along with several of his brothers and their sons, would return and build several more cabins, expanding the station. In the fall of that year, walking along the Cumberland Road cleared by his brother-in-law, William lead the largest wave of migration into Kentucky yet. A caravan of several hundred, it was described as being:

...with wagons strung out over half a mile along the narrow trace. They were unable to draw together at night for protection and unable to build fires for fear of attracting Indians. It was the largest single migration into Kentucky at that time.

In January 1780, land commissioners from Williamsburg came to process the land claims for Bryan, upon which William and his party learned that the claim was actually invalid, having been previously surveyed a year and a half earlier by absent Virginians. On May 23, while out hunting for meat, William was shot by natives, dying a week later. His sixteen-year-old son, William Bryan Jr., had been killed a week earlier in a similar ambush by Shawnee warriors. Disenchanted and without a leader, the Bryans soon moved back to North Carolina. However, in the fall of 1785, Mary Boone Bryan and her son, Daniel, returned to Marble Creek, Fayette County, Kentucky. William's sons, Daniel and Samuel, who had been previously branded as Tories by the courts of Rowan, served during the revolutionary war on behalf of the Patriots, receiving pensions for their service against pro-British native tribes in Kentucky.

In January 1781, Martin Wetzel, who was a captive of the Shawnee tribe, came with a party of seven Shawnee braves to steal horses at Bryan's Station, according to reports on a note by Colonel Levin Powell. Wetzel had helped organize a raid in the hopes of escaping. When the opportunity arose, he ran to the station, but the men present at the fort thought him to be a native and therefore threatened to shoot him. Daniel Boone, who happened to be present during this time and knew Wetzel, would vouch for the captive, whom would ultimately escape to the station.

== Siege of Bryan Station ==
The most important attack on the settlement occurred in August 1782 during the American Revolutionary War, when they were besieged by a force consisting of warriors from the Wyandot, Lenape and Shawnee tribes, along with a detachment of Butler's Rangers led by Captain William Caldwell and Simon Girty. In Col. Daniel Boone's estimation, the force numbered 400–500 strong. Bryan Station was located a short distance from a spring that the camp used for drinking water. None of the Bryan men were living in the garrison at the time of the siege.

Since the hostile forces secretly surrounding the fort did not realize that their presence was known by the defenders, the men allowed the women to exit the fort to retrieve water and other resources. The reason for this was to prevent any change in habit that could signal that the defenders were aware of the presence of the hidden force preparing to besiege them.

Historian Ranck asserts that all the important contemporary writers convey this impression:

For the men to go to the spring would be to do exactly as the savages desired and devote the garrison to destruction. If the women went in accordance with their regular early morning custom, the enemy would be confirmed in the delusion that their presence in force was undiscovered, and would withhold their fire to insure the complete success of their plans. The suggestion was full of hope, but all the same the savages were known to be mere creatures of impulse, hard to control and regardless of sex.

The Indians had no compunction attacking women, as they had done at nearby Ruddell's and Martin's Stations where even children were slaughtered two years earlier, and so the bravery of the women of Bryan Station is all the greater.

At the time of the siege, the militia did not realize just how many Indians were waiting for them outside of the fort or that these Indians had some support from the British. This attack was a surprise, and the militia in the fort were thus unprepared. The attackers lifted the siege after Indian scouts reported that a force of Kentucky militia was on the way. The militiamen pursued Caldwell's force but were defeated three days later at the Battle of Blue Licks, about 33 miles (53 km) northeast.

== Aftermath ==
The Lexington chapter of the Daughters of the American Revolution erected a monument in August 1896 to commemorate the importance of a nearby spring in helping preserve the fort from the attack by Indians and Canadians. The pioneer women, led by Mary "Polly" Hawkins Craig (wife of "The Travelling Church" patriarch Toliver Craig, Sr.), fetched water from the spring to not only prevent dangerously weakening dehydration in the unusually hot summer, but also to defend against the use of burning arrows by the attackers. If the defenders had succumbed to heat exhaustion or the fort had burned, the attackers could have reached the women and children sheltering there. Betsy Boone Grant was cited as a "Patriot - Defender of Bryan Station" by the Sons of the American Revolution for caring for the wounded during the siege.

A flaming arrow stuck in the cradle near the head of the infant who later became Col. Richard Mentor Johnson. Johnson would later be credited in all the earliest accounts of the War of 1812's Battle of the Thames with the slaying of Tecumseh, using a pistol loaded by his orderly Capt. Elijah Craig, who had also been present as an 18-year-old defender during the siege of Bryan Station. Located a couple of miles south of the fort's site, Bryan Station High School was named in its honor. The athletic teams compete under the name "Defenders."

== See also ==
- List of battles fought in Kentucky
