= Toliver Craig Sr. =

American frontiersman

Toliver Craig
- Born: Taliaferro Craig c.1704 Spotsylvania County, Virginia Colony
- Died: 1795; Woodford County, Kentucky, United States
- Other name: Tolliver Craig
- Occupations: Landowner, militia officer and farmer
- Known for: Early Kentucky pioneer and landowner; one of the defenders of Bryan Station
- Spouse: Mary "Polly" Hawkins (m. 1730)
- Children: 12
- Parent(s): Captain Ricardo Tagliaferro? and Jane Craig

Signature
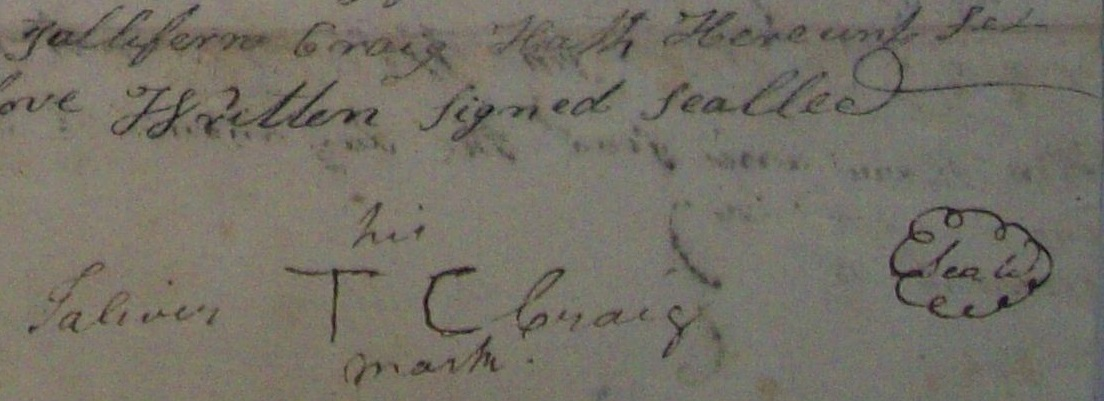

Toliver Craig Sr. (born Taliaferro Craig; c.1704–1795) was an 18th-century American frontiersman and militia officer. An early settler and landowner near present-day Lexington, Kentucky, he was one of the defenders of the early fort of Bryan Station during the American Revolutionary War. It was attacked by the British and Shawnee on August 15, 1782.

Craig and his family were early converts to the Baptist Church in the Colony of Virginia. His sons especially preached their religious views during the 1760s and 1770s. As a young man, his son Rev. Lewis Craig was a Baptist preacher jailed in Fredericksburg, Virginia for preaching without a license from the established Anglican Church, in a case considered important for religious freedom.

Toliver and his sons Lewis and Joseph Craig led 400-600 members of their congregation as "The Travelling Church" into Kentucky in 1781. A younger son, Rev. Elijah Craig, worked with James Madison on state guarantees for religious freedom after the Revolutionary War before following his kin to Kentucky, where he became a successful preacher, educator, and businessman.

Toliver Craig Jr. became an important landowner in Scott and Logan counties, Kentucky. He was elected as a representative to the Kentucky state legislature.

== Biography ==
Sources disagree about the circumstances of Taliaferro Craig's birth. According to traditional accounts and his own descendants, Taliaferro was the illegitimate son of Richard Taliaferro (aka Ricardo Tagliaferro), an Italian sea captain, and Jane Craig, a young Scottish woman descended from reformer John Craig, who traveled with him to the Virginia colony. She was pregnant and Tagliaferro never married her. Craig gave birth to a son she named Taliaferro Craig in 1704. His name was later anglicized to Toliver or Tolliver. Jane Craig never married.

Ricardo Tagliaferro was said to have settled in Virginia, where he later married and had a family. He was said to have a brother there, Robert Tagliaferro (or Taliaferro). The Taliaferro families became distinguished in Virginia.

But this story about a connection of Craig's father to Robert Tagliaferro may not be accurate. The Robert Taliaferro who was the ancestor of the prominent Taliaferro family of Virginia (later anglicized to Toliver or Tolliver), arrived in Virginia from England in the mid-17th century. His ancestors had been in England for some time, with the first serving as a court musician to Queen Elizabeth I in the 16th century.

Tolliver Craig became a modest farmer and member of the Virginia militia. In 1730, he married Mary Hawkins, with whom he would have 12 children. Like most people in Virginia, he and his family were largely illiterate. He was presumed to have decent social standing, as the Hawkins family were prominent in Virginia society at the time.

During the 1760s, Craig and his family embraced the Baptist movement. His sons Elijah, Lewis, and Joseph Craig became Baptist preachers. Elijah and Lewis were jailed in Fredericksburg, Virginia for preaching without a license from the Anglican Church. One account had them defended by Patrick Henry, but other historians call that apocryphal.

He is said to have bought in 1779 the David Bryan estate in what is now Raleigh County, WV, from pioneer Col. John (Johannes) Bowman.

Near the end of the Revolution, Craig and his family emigrated to Kentucky with the famous "Travelling Church," about 500 people led by his son Rev. Lewis, arriving to settle first at Gilbert's Creek in December 1781. Both in the group's own self-identity and in later church history, the journey was likened to the people following Moses in the Exodus. Arriving in April 1782, Craig lived briefly with his wife, many children, and grandchildren at Bryan's Station (near present-day Lexington). When the fort was besieged on 15 August by a British Canadian and Shawnee raiding party under Captain William Caldwell and Simon Girty, Craig and his wife Polly, although both were elderly, were some of the more well-known defenders. The 66-year-old Mary "Polly" Craig was reported to have led a group of women outside the fort to fetch water from a spring to quench burning arrows. Their courage was honored in 1896 by a DAR memorial located near the spring and naming all the Craig defenders.

Craig later became a prominent landowner, purchasing the David Bryan estate from John Bowman. He donated large amounts of land to the Baptist church. He died in Woodford County, Kentucky in 1795.

Toliver Craig Sr. had 12 children with his wife, Mary "Polly Hawkins: John Craig, Sr. - Rejoice "Joyce Jossa Jossie" Craig - Tolliver Craig Jr. - Elijah Craig - Rev. Lewis Craig - Joseph Craig - Jane Taliferro Craig - Sarah "Sally" Craig - Benjamin Craig - Jeremiah Craig - Elizabeth Hawkins Craig - Elizabeth Craig
