= Bracken Baptist Church =

Historic church in Kentucky, United States

- U.S. National Register of Historic Places
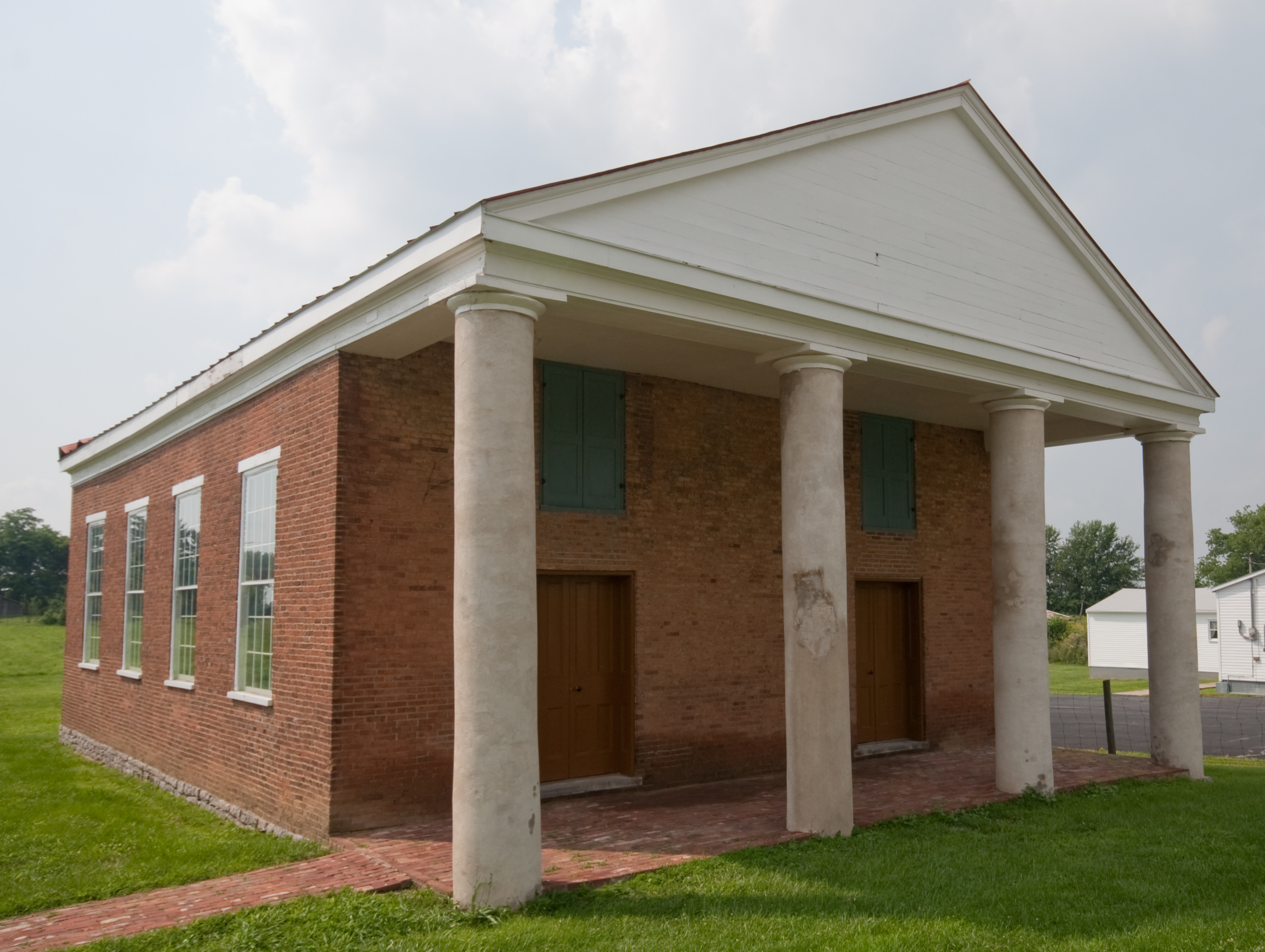

- Location within Kentucky Location within the United States
- Location: CR 1235, Minerva, Kentucky
- Coordinates: 38°42′22″N 83°55′8″W
- Area: 1 acre (0.40 ha)
- Built: 1840
- Architectural style: Greek Revival
- NRHP reference No.: 83002821
- Added to NRHP: April 28, 1983

Bracken Baptist Church (Old Minerva Church) is a historic church on CR 1235 in Minerva, Kentucky. The Bracken Baptist Church (structure), built circa 1840–1842, is an example of prostyle Greek Revival church architecture.

The Bracken County Church, established in June 1793 by the Rev. Lewis Craig, leader of The Travelling Church, is the oldest constituted Baptist church in northeastern Kentucky and one of six churches included in the Bracken Association formed here in 1799. The congregation was constituted with ten members dismissed for that purpose from the Limestone/Washington Baptist Church in Mason County, KY (organized in 1785 by Elder William Wood), and presided over by Lewis Craig, who was still a member of the South Elkhorn Baptist Church in Fayette County, KY.

Prior to construction of the 1840 structure, the congregation encountered several periods of discord. In 1805, it split over the issue of slavery, with both congregations sharing the same log church. In 1829–1830, the rapid rise of Campbellism eventually led to worship in the Minerva Church on alternate Sundays by Campbellist and traditional factions.

The church experienced a period of decline after 1850, and by 1886 only 60 members remained. The structure was used as a community center from 1900 to 1923 and baccalaureate services for Minerva High School were held there. The church structure was sold in 1928 for $280 and was used as a tobacco barn for the next forty years. The Bracken Association re-acquired the deteriorating structure in 1981. Restoration began and the structure was added to the National Register in 1983.
