= Elijah Craig =

American Baptist preacher (1738–1808)

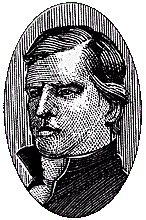
Elijah Craig

Elijah Craig (November 15, 1738 – May 18, 1808) was an American Baptist preacher, who became an educator and capitalist entrepreneur in the area of Virginia that later became the Commonwealth of Kentucky. He has sometimes, although rather dubiously, been credited with the invention of bourbon whiskey.

== Early life and education ==
Craig was born in Orange County, Virginia in 1738, the 5th child of Polly Hawkins and Taliaferro or Toliver Craig, Sr. Converted by Baptist David Thomas in 1764, Elijah Craig soon began holding meetings in his tobacco barn. In 1766, he convinced David Read to travel from North Carolina to baptize members of the new congregation, including himself. His older brother Lewis and younger brother Joseph Craig also became Baptist preachers. In 1768, Lewis was imprisoned with John Waller, James Childs, James Reed and William Marsh in the Fredericksburg jail for several weeks, for preaching without licenses from the established Anglican Church. In 1771, Elijah Craig was ordained and became the pastor of Blue Run church, halfway between Barboursville and Liberty Mills, Virginia. He was also jailed in Orange and Culpeper counties at least twice for preaching without the required Virginia license from the Anglican Church. Such preachers were considered a challenge to the entire social order of the colony, as the established state church received funding from the colony. In 1774, the convention of independent Baptists designated Elijah Craig and John Waller as apostles (missionaries) to evangelize north of the James River.

Although Virginia had adopted the principle of freedom of religion in its Declaration of Rights in 1776 and again in the Virginia Statute for Religious Freedom in 1786, Baptists still faced persecution during the early statehood period, particularly when they preached to mixed congregations of freemen and slaves, white and black. In these years, Baptists encouraged planters to free their slaves; and numerous slaves were freed in the Upper South during the first two decades after the Revolution. As more Baptists began to accept the institution of slavery, many of those who opposed slavery began to move west, often to the area that would later become Kentucky.

Craig became politically active as the legislative liaison of the general convention and general association to Virginia's legislature as well as the ratification convention of 1788. As such, he worked with Patrick Henry and James Madison to protect religious freedom federally and in Virginia after the Revolutionary War. Ultimately, religious freedom became protected in Virginia by statute (and the Anglican Church was disestablished, i.e. lost government financial support), as well as in the First Amendment to the United States Constitution. Baptist membership grew, particularly among common planters with smaller holdings of land and slaves.

== Migration and settling in Kentucky area of Virginia ==
Seeking religious freedom and economic opportunity, in 1781 Elijah's brother Rev. Lewis Craig led an exodus of up to 600 people known as "The Travelling Church" (composed of his parents, younger siblings, and most of his congregation from Spotsylvania County) to the area of Virginia known as Kentucky County (they were the largest single group to so migrate). Elijah Craig did not go with this group but followed a few years later.

In 1782 (just after the Revolutionary War), Elijah Craig led the immigration of his congregation from Orange Co., VA, and purchased 1,000 acres (4.0 km^{2}) in what was then Fayette County of Kentucky, where he planned and laid out a town originally called Lebanon, which was incorporated in 1784. (In 1790 the town was renamed Georgetown in honor of Gen. George Washington.) Craig preached at several churches with John Waller.

In 1786, Craig became pastor of the Great Crossing Church, which they had founded the previous year. Joseph Redding succeeded Craig in 1793 after a controversy concerning some of Craig's economic activities, and the expulsion of Craig and his party. In 1795 Craig was among the 35 founding members of McConnell's Church, near McConnells Run (that later moved and became known as Stamping Ground Baptist Church). Both churches were part of the Elkhorn Association of Baptist churches.

Elijah Craig was active in education, establishing the first classical school in Kentucky in 1787. His advertisement in The Kentucky Gazette read:

Education. Notice is hereby given that on Monday, 28 January next, a school will be opened by Messrs. Jones and Worley, at the Royal Spring in Lebanon Town, Fayette County, where a commodious house, sufficient to contain fifty or sixty scholars, will be prepared. They will teach the Latin and Greek languages, together with such branches of the sciences as are usually taught in public seminaries, at twenty five shillings a quarter for each scholar. One half to be paid in cash, the other half in produce at cash prices. There will be a vacation of a month in the spring, and another in the fall, at the close of each of which it is expected that such payments as are due in cash will be made. For diet, washing and house room for a year, each scholar pays £3 in cash, or 500 weight of pork on entrance, and £3 cash on the beginning of the third quarter. It is desired that, as many as can, would furnish themselves with beds; such as cannot may be provided for here, to the number of eight or ten boys, at 35s a year for each bed. ELIJAH CRAIG. LEBANON, December 27, 1787.

The school was later linked to the Rittenhouse Academy, which Craig founded in 1798. Elijah Craig also donated land for Georgetown College, the first Baptist college founded west of the Allegheny Mountains. The college continues today.

Craig became a businessman and local magnate. He built Kentucky's first fulling mill (for cloth manufacturing), its first paper mill, its first ropewalk (for manufacturing rope from hemp), and the first lumber and gristmill at Georgetown. Craig played a major role in forming the Georgetown Fire Department and also served as Fire Chief.

== Distillery ==
In approximately 1789, Craig founded a distillery. This last enterprise led to his subsequent dubious reputation as the inventor of bourbon whiskey. Craig has sometimes been claimed to have been the first to age the distillation in charred oak casks, "a process that gives the bourbon its brownish color and unique taste".

Craig built his distillery in what was then Fayette County. The location later became part of Woodford County in 1789, and then Scott County in 1792. It was never in Bourbon County, as some have claimed. As it happened, both Fayette County and Bourbon County were named in honor of the noted Revolutionary War Gen. Gilbert du Motier, Marquis de Lafayette, a French aristocrat of the royal House of Bourbon.

American whiskey authority Charles Kendrick Cowdery believes Craig was making exactly the same kind of whiskey as most of his contemporaries, and historian Henry Crowgey calls his reputed invention of bourbon simply a "charming legend". By 1785, when Bourbon County was formed, dozens (if not hundreds) of small farmer-distillers west of the Alleghenies made corn-based whiskies, which they called bourbon, to distinguish them from the rye-based whiskies commonly distilled in the East. No historical evidence indicates that Craig's whiskey was unique in its time, nor that he practiced charring of the aging barrels. The first known publication potentially alluding to Craig as bourbon's inventor was in 1874 (this includes a brief entry in a densely packed list without mentioning Craig himself or providing any documentation of the claim, and without any elaboration as to what distinguished the product as the first bourbon).

== Death ==
Craig continued to prosper, eventually owning more than 4,000 acres (16 km^{2}) and enough slaves to cultivate it, and operating a retail store in Frankfort. He died in Georgetown in 1808. John Taylor wrote of him in A History of Ten Baptist Churches, "His preaching was of the most solemn style; his appearance as of a man who had just come from the dead; of a delicate habit, a thin visage, large eyes and mouth; the sweet melody of his voice, both in preaching and singing, bore all down before it."

The Kentucky Gazette eulogized Craig as follows, "He possessed a mind extremely active and, as his whole property was expended in attempts to carry his plans to execution, he consequently died poor. If virtue consists in being useful to our fellow citizens, perhaps there were few more virtuous men than Mr. Craig."

== Legacy ==
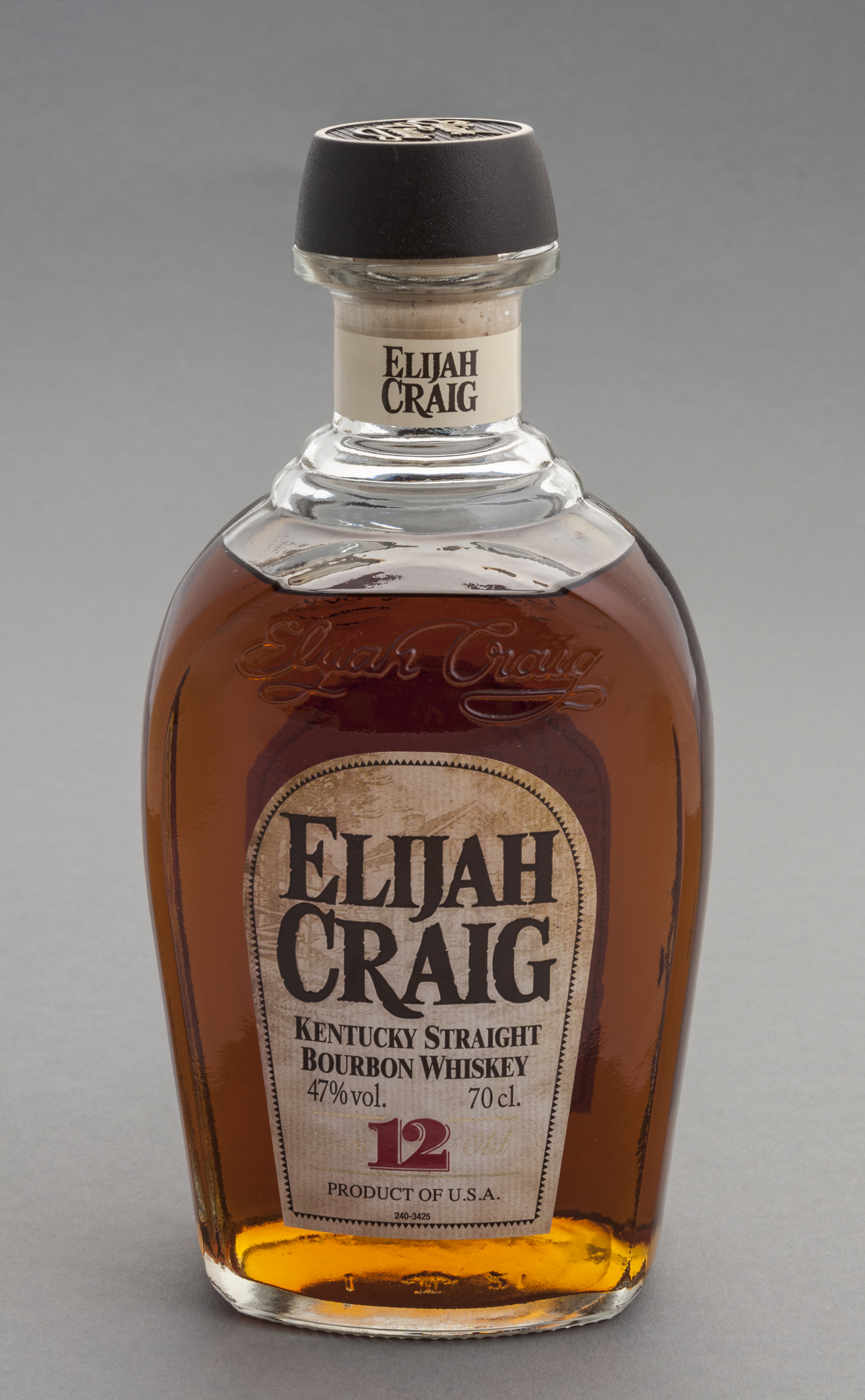
Elijah Craig brand Kentucky straight bourbon whiskey produced by Heaven Hill

Craig may be most widely known by the bourbon brand Elijah Craig produced by Heaven Hill Distilleries.

Elijah Craig bourbon whiskey was made in both 12-year-old "Small Batch" and 18-year-old "Single Barrel" bottlings. The former 12-year-old expression has lost the age statement. The 18-Year-Old Single Barrel Bourbon is touted by its producer as "The oldest Single Barrel Bourbon in the world at 18 years ..." made in oak barrels that are "hand selected by Parker and Craig Beam", losing nearly 2/3 of the barrels' contents in Angel's share.
