= London Ferrill =

London Ferrell
- Born: 1789; Hanover County, Virginia, U.S.
- Died: October 12, 1854 (aged 64–65); Lexington, Kentucky, U.S.
- Occupation: minister

Religious life
- Religion: Baptist

London Ferrill, also spelled Ferrell, (1789–October 12, 1854) was a former enslaved man and carpenter from Virginia who became the second preacher of the First African Baptist Church in Lexington, Kentucky, serving from 1823 to 1854. During his 31 years of service, Ferrill attracted and baptized many new members in the growing region; by 1850, the church had 1,820 members and was the largest of any congregation in the state, black or white.

Of mixed race, Ferrill had been apprenticed as a carpenter when young. His wife, a free person of color, purchased his freedom and moved to Kentucky by 1812. In Lexington, Ferrill successfully worked with the city's black and white leaders and became highly respected. His funeral procession numbered 5,000 people, the largest in the city after that of the white statesman Henry Clay. Ferrill led the first black church west of the Allegheny Mountains; it was the third oldest black Baptist congregation in the United States and had been founded in 1790 by enslaved preacher Peter Durrett, also from Virginia.

== Early life and education ==
London was born into slavery in 1789 in Hanover County, Virginia, where Richard Ferrill, an English immigrant, enslaved his mother. The unmarried enslaver died soon after. Ferrill's estate, including enslaved persons, was inherited by his sister, Ann (Ferrill) Winston. She named the mixed-race enslaved boy London Ferrill after her brother, who was likely his father. As noted by Edward Ball, author of Slaves in the Family (1999), a study of the interracial relationships among his ancestors, mixed-race enslaved people were frequently given names that distinguished them from the others. London Ferrill is an example of such naming.

Ann Winston died when London Ferrill was eight or nine years old. When her estate was settled, London was sold away from his mother to Colonel Samuel Overton. Soon, the enslaver apprenticed Ferrill to learn carpentry, a skilled trade. This was often the pattern for children of white enslavers, giving them an artisan skill to support themselves as adults.

Ferrill was baptized in 1809 at the age of 20 and had a conversion experience with the Baptists. The minister and congregation approved his preaching and singing, and he began to preach more widely in the community.

== Marriage and family ==
As a young man, Ferrill married a free black woman named Rodah Hood, who was also of mixed race. She bought her husband's freedom from Overton's estate after his death. (Townsend records her first name as Rhoda.) At that time, Ferrill and Rodah migrated to Kentucky; they settled in Lexington about 1812.

A few years after Rodah died in 1833 during a major cholera epidemic in Lexington, Ferrill adopted two orphaned children, siblings Eleazer and Elizabeth Jackson. He never remarried.

== Career ==
As an enslaved man, Ferrill was not permitted to be ordained. Still, local people asked him to preach, and about fifty people converted under his preaching before he moved to Kentucky. He moved to Lexington, where another preacher, Peter Durrett (known as Old Captain), was preaching at what is known as the First African Baptist Church of Lexington. Durrett was quite old, and the people desired Ferrill to begin preaching. In 1817, he joined the First Baptist Church, a white congregation. The local leaders of the white Baptist community were uncertain whether or not the people Durrett had baptized should be accepted into the church, as Durrett had not been regularly ordained.

Ferrill was ordained in 1822, and leaders of the First Baptist Church helped the First African Baptist Church be covenanted in "fellowship" in 1822; this allowed it to be independent. In 1823, the Trustees of Lexington formally appointed Ferrill as the preacher for the First African Baptist Church to succeed the aging founder, Peter Durrett. It was the oldest black Baptist church west of the Allegheny Mountains and the third oldest in the United States.

Ferrill worked well with both blacks and whites in the growing city. In 1824, his church was received into the Elkhorn Association, the local Baptist association consisted mostly of white churches. After several years, Ferrill had created considerable goodwill. White leaders initiated a legislative petition to permit him to remain in the state in response to a threat from rivals competing for control of the black church. They had threatened to force Ferrill from the state, using the law that required free blacks from other states to leave Kentucky after 90 days.

In 1833, Ferrill was notable as among the few clergy to stay in Lexington during the cholera epidemic, when he cared for the sick, dying, and bereaved. Five hundred of the city's total 7,000 population died, including his wife Rodah and nearly one-third of the congregation of Christ Church Episcopal. Other ministers who stayed were Rev. Benjamin Bosworth Smith of Christ Church, whose wife died in the epidemic, and Father Ed McMahon of the Catholic Church.

With the growth of Lexington and the region, Ferrill baptized many new converts, including those in outlying areas. He continued to attract members to his growing congregation. By 1850, the First African Baptist Church had 1,820 members, both enslaved and free peoples, and was the largest congregation, black or white, in the state. Ferrill was said to have baptized 5,000 persons during his years of service in the region.

== Death and legacy ==
Ferrill died of a heart attack October 12, 1854. His funeral procession numbered nearly 5,000, the largest in the city after that two years before for the white planter and statesman Henry Clay. Because of his high reputation and long service in the city, Ferrill was buried in the Old Episcopal Burying Ground, the only African American so honored.

In 2010, Christ Church Cathedral held a special joint service with First African Baptist to commemorate Ferrill, at which both choirs sang. Christ Church parishioner Robert Voll, who has worked on the monument and community garden projects (see below), said, "London Ferrill was a force for unity, a force for connecting the black and white communities of Lexington."

== Legacy and honors ==
- 1854, Ferrill was the only person of color buried in the Old Episcopal Burying Ground.
- 2008, Christ Church Cathedral dedicated its community garden in Ferrill's honor.
- 2010, Christ Church Cathedral helped gain approval for a city monument installed in Ferrill's honor at the Old Episcopal Burying Ground. The state has also memorialized the site with a highway marker. Christ Church held a joint service with First African Baptist to commemorate Ferrill and the monument.
