= Peter Durrett =

Baptist preacher

Peter Durrett (c. 1733–1823) (also appeared in records as Peter Duerrett) was an enslaved Baptist preacher, who with his wife founded the First African Baptist Church of Lexington, Kentucky, by 1790. By his death, the congregation totaled nearly 300 persons. It is the first black congregation west of the Allegheny Mountains, the first black Baptist congregation in Kentucky, and the third oldest black congregation in the United States. Its historic church was built in 1856 under the third pastor and is listed on the National Register of Historic Places.

== Early life and educations ==
Peter Durrett was born enslaved to his white father, Captain Duerrett, on his Caroline County, Virginia, plantation. Durrett would have learned a variety of skills from his mother and fellow enslaved people. While in Caroline County, at about age 25, he became Baptist and an active exhorter. This was during the First Great Awakening, the revival of the late 18th century when Methodist and Baptist preachers in the Southern United States converted many people.

== Marriage and family ==
Durrett married a woman enslaved on another farm. When he learned in 1781 that her enslaver planned to migrate to Kentucky, he asked Captain Duerrett for help. Duerrett's enslaver made an exchange so the couple could stay together, and Durrett prepared to relocate.

== Career ==
The Baptist preacher Joseph Craig enslaved Durrett and his wife. Craig, his family, and the people he enslaved migrated in 1781 with the congregation and other members of The Travelling Church, led by Craig's older brother Rev. Lewis Craig from Spotsylvania County, Virginia. Because Durrett helped the military leader, Captain William Ellis, guide several hundred migrants on the arduous 600-mile journey through the Appalachian Mountains, he became known as Old Captain among the travelers. Durrett was believed to have learned the route, perhaps on an earlier journey with Ellis.

Durrett became a Baptist preacher in Kentucky, although he was never formally ordained. In 1784, Durrett and his wife were members of their enslaver Joseph Craig's church at the head of Boone's Creek. It was about eight miles east of the settlement of Lexington.

Soon after, when the church dissolved, Craig permitted Durrett and his wife to hire themselves out and move to Lexington. They were hired most steadily by the American pioneer John Maxwell, who helped them build a cabin on his property at Maxwell Spring. Here, Durrett called fellow enslaved people together and began preaching. In the early years, they often met at different locations. The 19th-century religious historian and minister, Robert Hamilton Bishop, gives Mrs. Durrett credit for having been integral to forming the congregation: "His wife was also particularly active in providing accommodations for the people, and in encouraging them to be in earnest about the things which belonged to their everlasting peace.

Durrett applied to the local Baptist association for ordination, which they declined to do but "directed him to go on in the name of their common Master." Gradually, Durrett and his wife gathered about 50 congregants, most of whom Durrett baptized. As the congregation united as a church, Durrett began to administer the Lord's Supper.

By 1790, they had founded the First African Church of Lexington, now known as the First African Baptist Church. It was the first black congregation west of the Allegheny Mountains, the oldest black Baptist congregation in Kentucky, and the third oldest in the United States. Its early congregants were fellow enslaved people, who were joined by an increasing number of free blacks in the Lexington area. The congregation was believed to number up to 300 people during Durrett's lifetime. The trustees, all free men of color, purchased their first property for a worship place in 1815. Durrett lived until 1823 when he was said to be near 90.

He was succeeded by Rev. London Ferrill, who was also of mixed race. He was a free man of color whose free wife had purchased his freedom from slavery in Virginia. During his more than 30 years of service, Ferrill increased the congregation to 1,820 by 1850, making it the largest of any church, black or white, in the state. Although Durrett was never ordained, Ferrill was ordained by the First Baptist Church, a white congregation in Lexington. Leaders in that church decided to accept the people Durrett had baptized without re-Baptism as members of Ferrill's congregation.
