= First African Baptist Church (Lexington, Kentucky) =

Historic church in Kentucky, United States

- U.S. National Register of Historic Places
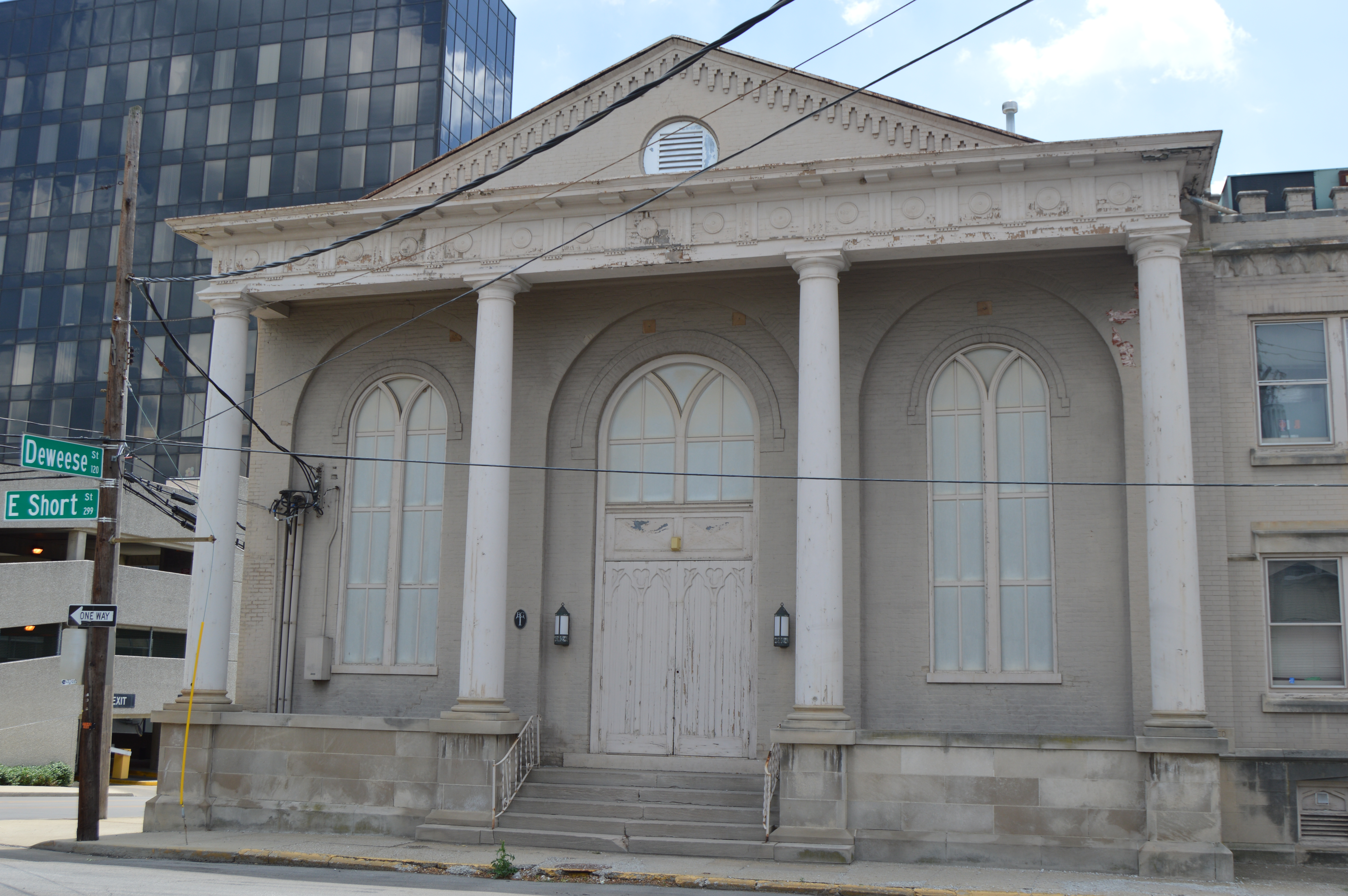
- Front of the church's former building

- Location within Kentucky Location within the United States
- Location: 264-272 E. Short St., Lexington, Kentucky
- Coordinates: 38°2′38.1″N 84°29′34.1″W
- Area: 0.2 acres (0.081 ha)
- Built: 1856
- Architectural style: Italianate, Collegiate Tudor
- NRHP reference No.: 86000854
- Added to NRHP: April 24, 1986

First African Baptist Church is a Baptist church at 264-272 E. Short Street in Lexington, Kentucky. The congregation was founded c. 1790 by Peter Durrett and his wife, slaves who came to Kentucky with their master, Rev. Joseph Craig, in 1781 with "The Travelling Church" of Baptists from Spotsylvania, Virginia.

First African Baptist of Lexington is the oldest black Baptist church in Kentucky and the third oldest in the United States; it is the oldest black congregation west of the Allegheny Mountains. In 1850 under its second pastor, it had more than 1,800 members, the largest congregation of any in the state. The nineteenth-century Italianate church was constructed in 1856; by 1861 the congregation at this building numbered 2,223 members. The church was listed on the National Register of Historic Places in 1986. Today the first African Baptist congregation worships at a newer church at 465 Price Road.

== History ==
Peter Durrett was born into slavery on the plantation of his white father and master, Captain Duerrett of Caroline County, Virginia. As a young man of 25, he converted to the Baptist faith and married an enslaved woman who lived on Rev. Joseph Craig's plantation. Peter probably accompanied frontier guide Capt. William Ellis to the Kentucky district in 1779 scouting the subsequent Travelling Church migration. After their return and upon learning that his wife's master intended to so migrate, Peter asked for help from Duerrett, who traded him to Craig so the couple could stay together.

Durrett and his wife migrated in 1781 with their master and others of the largely Baptist Travelling Church from Spotsylvania, Virginia, led by Joseph's older brother Rev. Lewis Craig. Because Durrett helped the military leader, Captain William Ellis, guide the several hundred migrants and their slaves on the arduous 600-mile journey through the Appalachian Mountains, he was known as Old Captain after the trip. By 1784 Old Captain and his wife were members of a Separatist Baptist church at Boone's Creek, where Joseph Craig was pastor.

Soon after, Peter Durrett and his wife got permission from Craig to be hired out and moved to Lexington. There they hired themselves to the pioneer John Maxwell, who let them build a cabin on his property at Maxwell Spring in Lexington. This is where Duerrett began preaching to fellow slaves. The 19th-century religious historian Robert Hamilton Bishop noted that Mrs. Durrett was integral to forming the first congregation:

His wife was also particularly active in providing accommodations for the people, and in encouraging them to be in earnest about the things which belonged to their everlasting peace.

Durrett applied to the local Baptist association for ordination, accompanied by numerous people seeking baptism. He had hesitated to baptize them without ordination. The association did not ordain Durrett, but "directed him to go on in the name of their common Master." Durrett began to baptize persons he believed ready.

Durrett and his wife gathered about 50 congregants, most of whom he baptized. About 1790, the members united as the First African Church (now known as the Historic Pleasant Green Baptist Church in Lexington), and Durrett began to administer the Lord's Supper. This is the oldest black Baptist church in Kentucky and the third oldest in the United States. It is also the oldest black church west of the Allegheny Mountains. Its early congregants were slaves and free blacks from the Lexington area. The congregation bought its first property in 1815. In 1816 it started a religious school, which continued with lay teachers and classes in various locations.

The congregation's first deed for land was dated in July 1820, for property purchased by the trustees: Rolla Blue, William Gist, Solomon Walker, and James Pullock, all free men of color. In July 1822 by written covenant, the church was admitted to fellowship by the First Baptist Church of Lexington (a white congregation). Durrett lived until 1823, when he was said to be near 90. His congregation then numbered near 300.

Durrett was succeeded in 1823 by Rev. London Ferrill, who was appointed preacher by the Lexington city trustees. A former slave from Hanover County, Virginia, he was freed as a young man by his unmarried master's sister, who inherited his estate and named the infant. (He was likely his first master's son, as he is believed to have been of mixed race and was given a distinguishing name by his master's sister.) Although not formally educated, Ferrill was a powerful preacher; he worked as a skilled carpenter. He and his wife migrated to Kentucky and settled in Lexington. He was ordained as a preacher by the First Baptist Church (majority white) before being called to the First African Baptist Church, and was a leader among both the white and black communities.

Ferrill served nearly 31 years. After his appointment, his church was received into the Elkhorn Association of the Baptist Church. With the continuing growth of Lexington, the First African Baptist congregation attracted many new members, mostly enslaved, but also free blacks. In 1833 the church purchased the former Old Methodist Meeting House and met there for some years. Ferrill led the congregational growth from 280 to 1,820 members by 1850, when it was the largest church in Kentucky, black or white.

During the cholera epidemic of 1833, Ferrill was one of three clergy who stayed in the city to care for people; his own wife died during the crisis. He was said to marry slaves with the words: "united until death or distance did them part," which reflected the years of many slaves being sold from the Upper South to the Deep South. Louisville was a major shipping point for slaves being transported down the Ohio and Mississippi rivers.

In 1854 Ferrill died suddenly of a heart attack. His funeral procession of nearly 5,000 persons to his burial at the Old Episcopal Burying Ground of Christ Church was said to be the largest in Lexington after that of the statesman Henry Clay two years before. Ferrill was the only black to be buried there.

In 1856 First African Baptist completed their new building, designed in the popular Italianate style with large, arched windows. By the beginning of the American Civil War in 1861, the congregation numbered 2,223.

After the war, together with most other black Baptist churches, the congregation withdrew from the Elkhorn Baptist Association, as they wanted to be independent of white supervision. First African Baptist soon joined a state association of black Baptist congregations established after the war. Today the congregation is part of the National Baptist Convention, USA, the largest association of African-American Baptists.

In 1987, the First African Baptist congregation sold its historic building downtown to the nearby Central Christian Church, which has used it as a childcare center. They are considering sale of the historic structure. The First African Baptist congregation moved in the 1980s to a new facility at 465 Price Road.

== Honors ==
- The 1856 church building was added to the National Register of Historic Places in 1986.
- 2008, Christ Church Cathedral named its community garden for London Ferrill, second preacher of First African Baptist.
- In 2010 Christ Church helped gain approval for a city monument installed in honor of London Ferrill at the Old Episcopal Burying Ground. The state has also memorialized the site with a highway marker.

== See also ==
- National Register of Historic Places listings in Kentucky
