= The Travelling Church =

American 18th-century church group

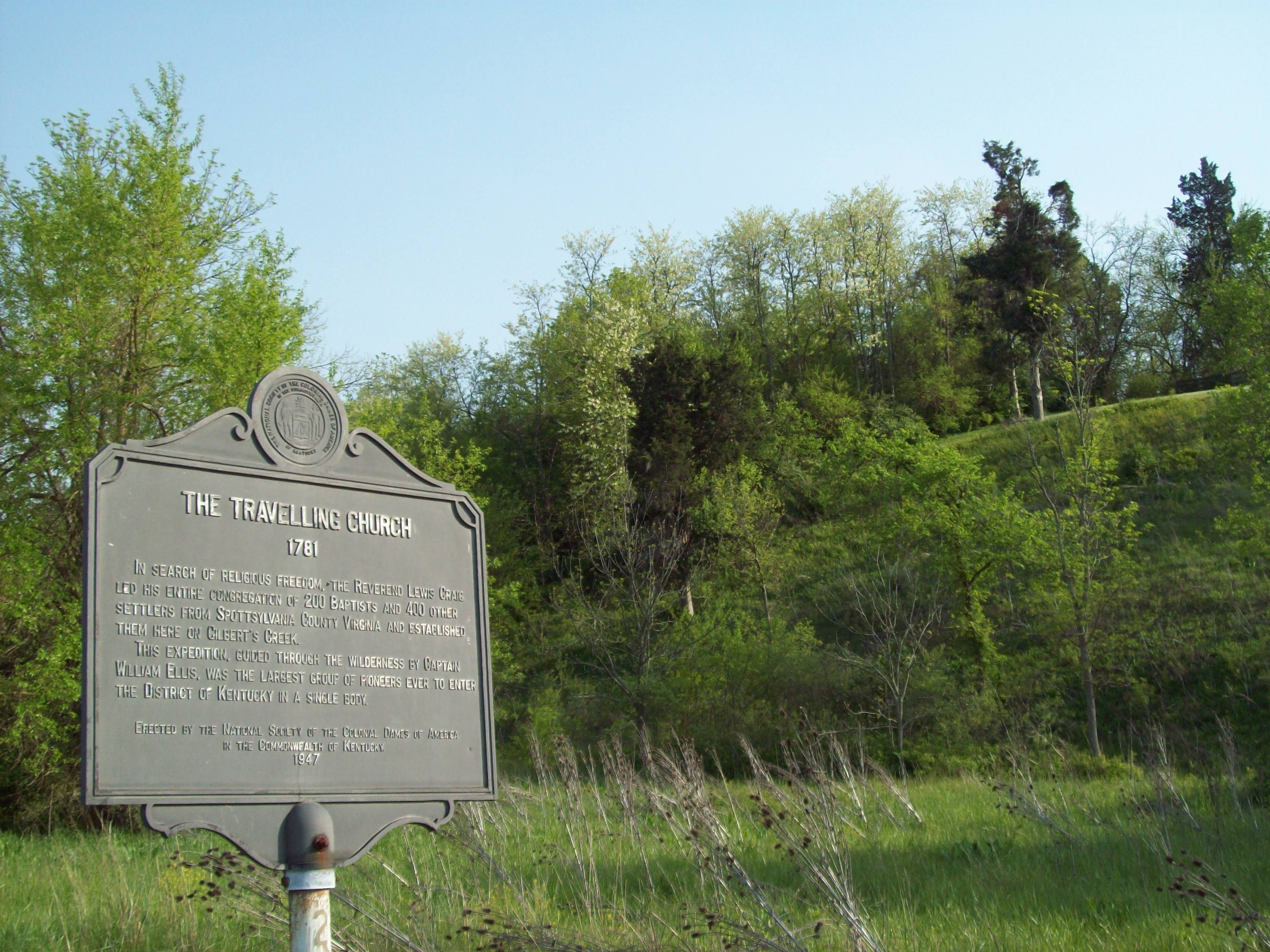
Roadside State Marker 25 for The Travelling Church in front of the hill atop which they built their first fortified church in the wilderness of pioneer Kentucky.

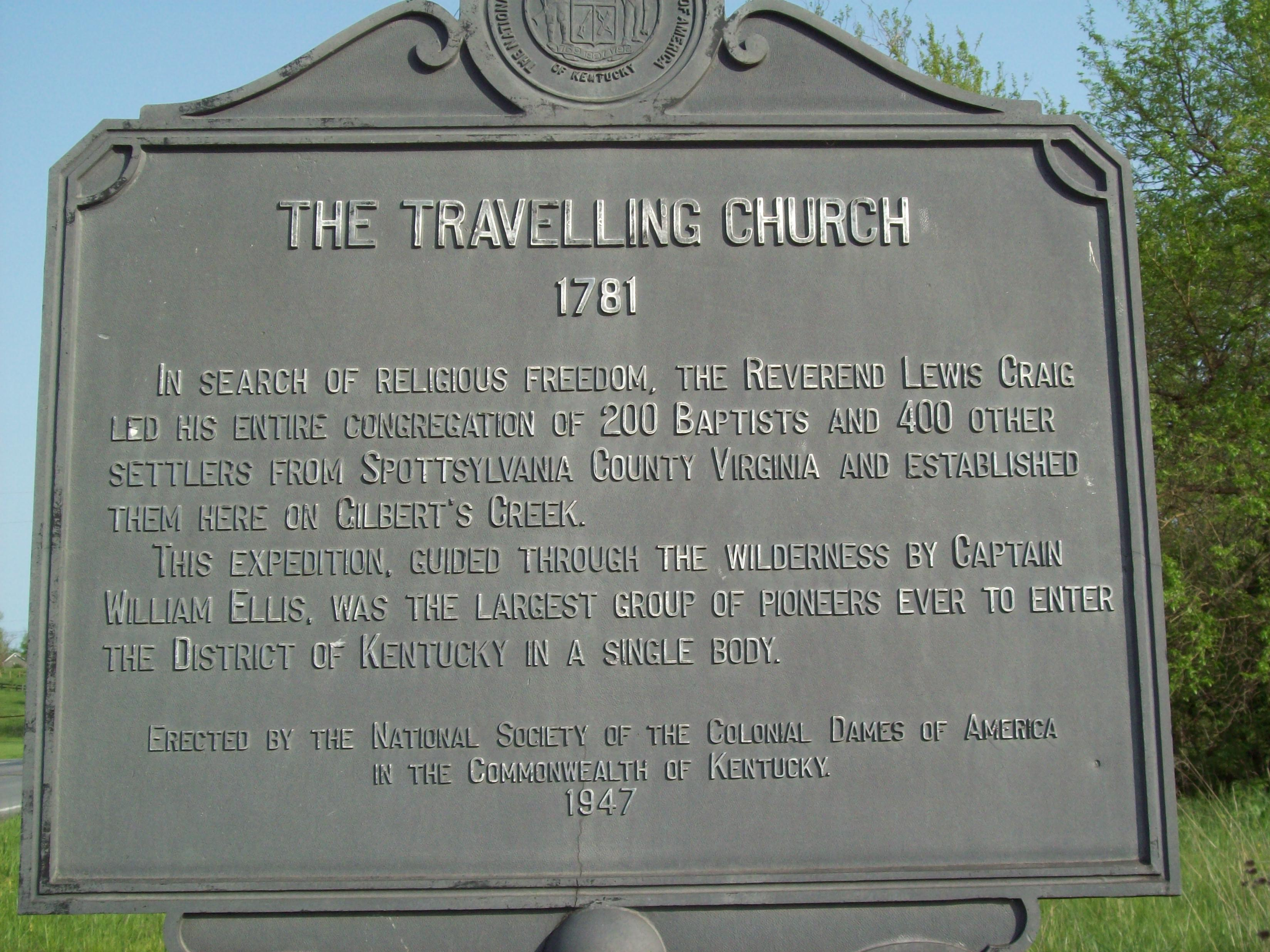
Roadside memorial for "The Travelling Church, 1781" by the National Society of the Colonial Dames of America.

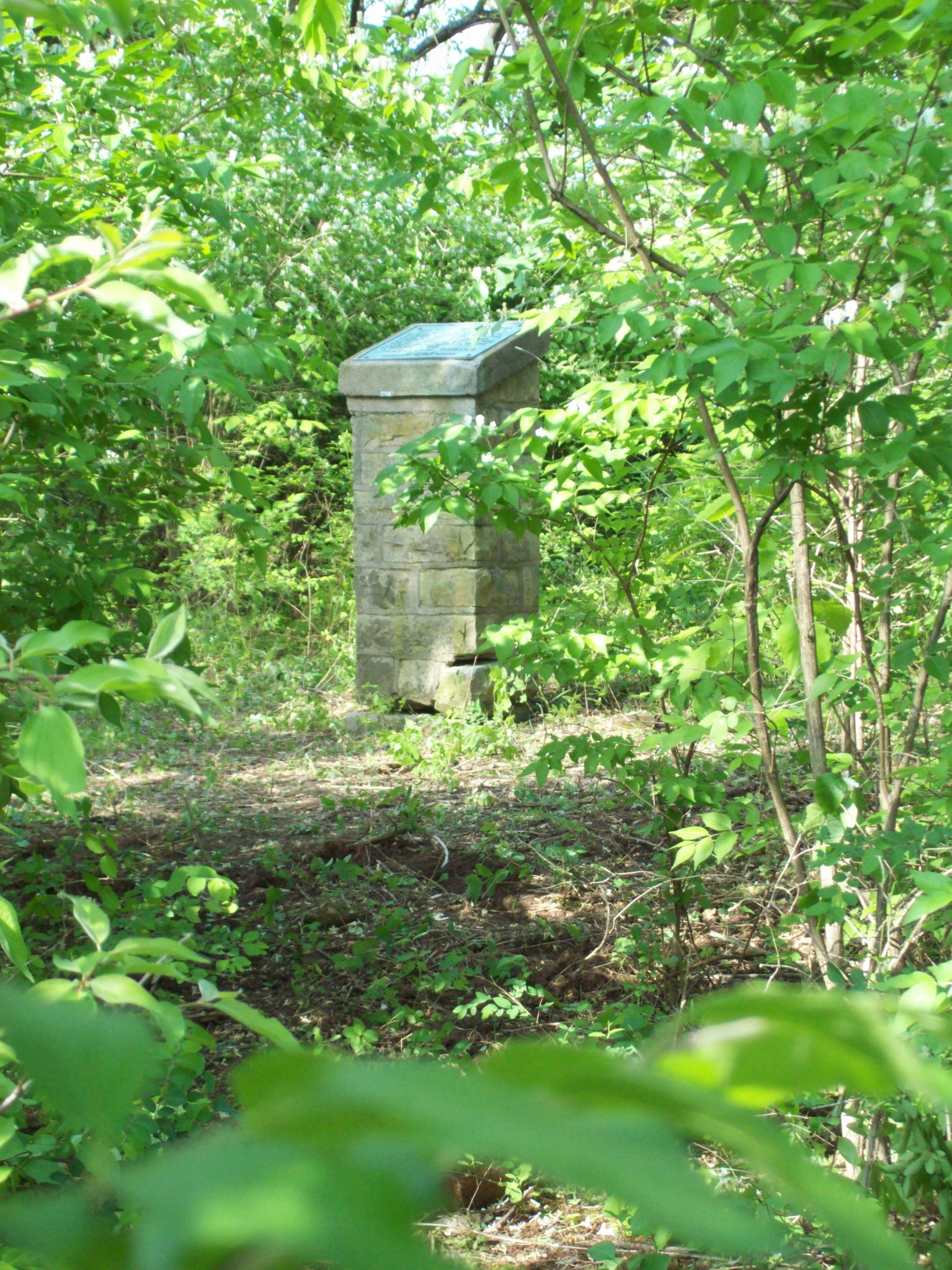
Monument erected on hilltop site of historic Gilbert's Creek Church.

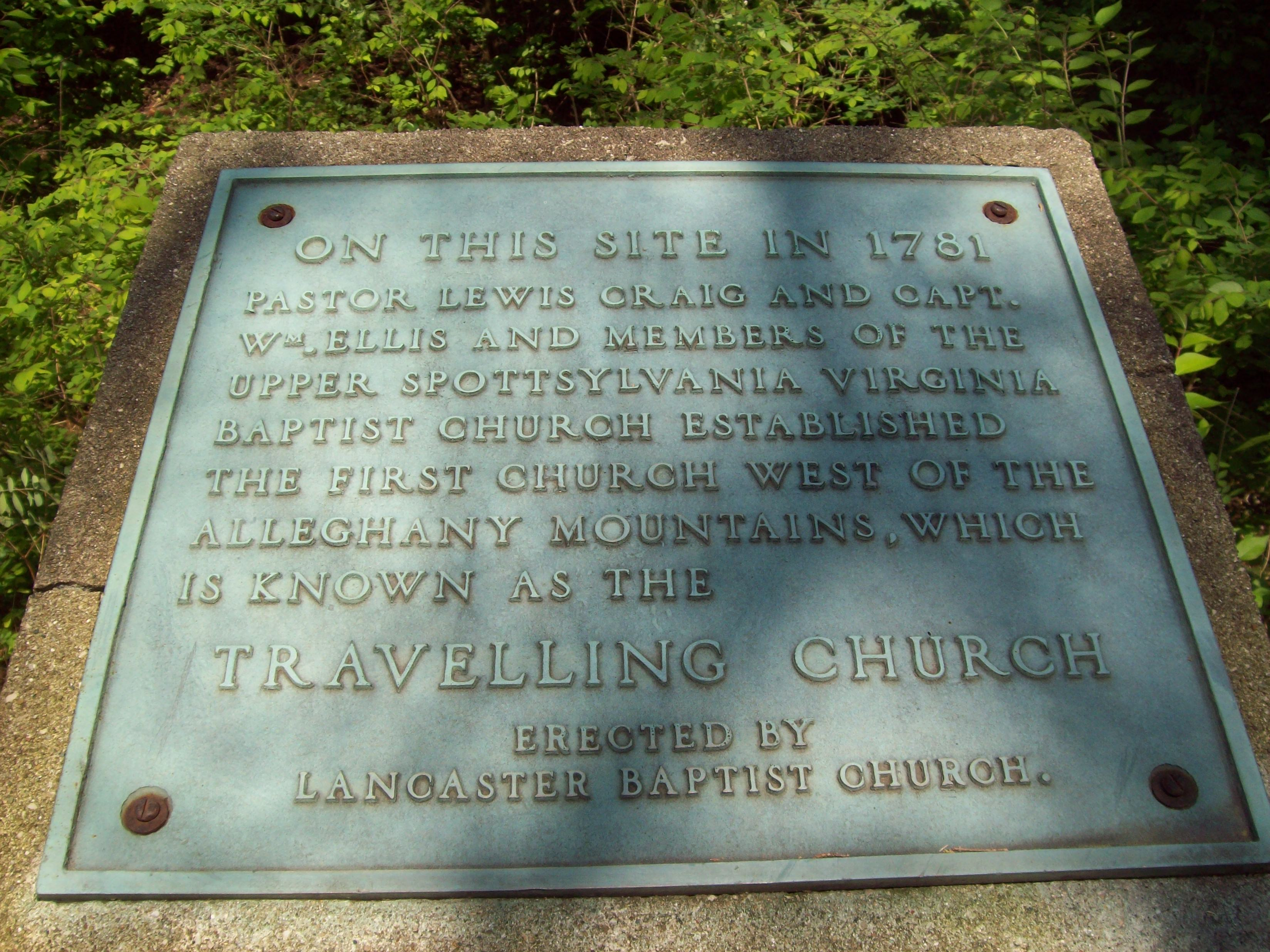
Memorial tablet to "The Travelling Church" on the hilltop monument.

The Travelling Church was a large group of pioneering settlers in the late 1700s that emigrated from Spotsylvania County, Virginia, to the Kentucky District of Virginia. It was the largest group that migrated to the area in a single movement. The group was led by the Reverend Lewis Craig, one of three pastor sons of Toliver Craig Sr., and its core was his Baptist congregation. The group of about 600 people arrived at Gilbert's Creek, Kentucky, in December 1781. Other preachers in the Travelling Church were Lewis Craig's younger brother Rev. Joseph Craig and his beloved slave Peter Durrett, who later became a pioneering black minister in Lexington, Kentucky. Lewis Craig's other brother who was a minister, Rev. Elijah Craig, did not come with the rest of the Church, as he remained for a while in Virginia to help James Madison establish constitutional religious liberty assurances before joining the group later. The group's pioneering members were to found many churches (including the first north of the Kentucky River), settlements, and other institutions that continue to this day.

== The group and its journey ==
Seeking religious freedom and economic opportunity, in 1781 Rev. Lewis Craig led a group numbering "perhaps five or six hundred" people known as "The Travelling Church" composed of a core comprised by a majority of the Baptist congregation of Lewis' Upper Spottsylvania church, along with other settlers joining in, to the area of Virginia known as Kentucky County.

"Leaving behind the discrimination against them by the established church in colonial Virginia, they sought fertile soil" for both physical and spiritual fruitbearing. "This hardy group...was led by the Rev. Lewis Craig, who saw his flock's trek across the mountains as parallel to that of the Israelites leaving Egypt for Canaan." During the fall-winter of 1781, Craig as Moses and Capt. William Ellis as Joshua led the huge train over the frozen and danger-filled Cumberland Gap with only a little loss of life into the rugged frontier of Kentucky for their Promised Land.

The emigrants included slaves held by the Craigs and others. They walked down the Great Wagon Road in the Blue Ridge Mountains through present-day Lynchburg, Roanoke and Fort Chiswell, gathering members, before joining the Wilderness Road. They crossed the Appalachians through the Cumberland Gap, continued north up the Wilderness Road, and ultimately settled in central Kentucky, establishing their first church and community at Gilbert's Creek.

"The Travelling Church" historical marker and the hilltop location of their fortified church is available online. This memorial by the National Society of the Colonial Dames of America in the Commonwealth of Kentucky for "The Travelling Church, 1781" is also known as State Marker 25 and is located on KY 39/Lancaster Rd, ca. 2.5 miles SE of Lancaster, Garrard Co., KY, 40444; 37.577915, -84.558316. The text from State Marker 25:

    In search of religious freedom, the Reverend Lewis Craig led his entire congregation of 200
    Baptists and 400 other settlers from Spottsylvania County, Virginia, and established them here
    on Gilbert's Creek. This expedition, guided through the wilderness by Captain William Ellis,
    was the largest group of pioneers ever to enter the District of Kentucky in a single body. 
                 Erected by the National Society of the Colonial Dames of America
                                 in the Commonwealth of Kentucky.
                                               1947.[14][15][16][17][18][19]

Up on the hilltop behind the roadside marker was constructed the fortified blockhouse serving as both a house of worship and a place of defense from Indian attacks. There is also a monument to "The Travelling Church" atop that hill on the site of the church fort. On the other side of the current road next to Gilbert's Creek they erected the wooden stockade fort known as Craig's Station, where the settlers lived.

This original Travelling Church changed their name to Gilbert's Creek Baptist Church when Rev. Craig and others moved on further north two years later to found other churches and settlements. They are the third-oldest Baptist church in Kentucky and, although moved a short distance from the original site, still continue regular worship today.

Other churches founded by Travelling Church members and which still continue today include Forks of Dix River Church (1782), South Elkhorn Christian Church (1783), Clear Creek Baptist Church (1785), First African Baptist Church (ca. 1790), Mt. Pleasant Baptist Church (1791, 1801), Bracken Baptist Church (1793), the Providence church in Madison county, etc.

== Travelling Church members ==
While a complete list of names for those participating in the Travelling Church exodus and settling in Kentucky is impossible, various names are known.

Old William Marshall preached to them, with their pastor, the first Sunday after their arrival. Among their members were nearly all the family of the Craigs, the old father and mother, four sons and their daughters, all married. The Bowmans, a name associated with the daring and bloody conflicts with the Indian warriors, are found in the list of Ashers, Singletons, Smiths, Hunts, Shotwells, Mitchums, Curds, Caves, Hickersons, Sanders, - many, in fine, whose names are familiar, and their descendants are to be found all over Kentucky, who were members of this traveling church.

A more complete compilation from several sources includes:

Allen	Eastin	Price
Asher	Ellis, Wm & family of 5	Ramsey
Barrow	Elly	Robinson & wife
Bledsoe, Rev. Joseph	Garrard	Rucker
Bowman	Goodloe	Sanders
Buckner	Hart	Shackelford
Burbridge	Hunt	Shipp
Carr	Hickerson	Shotwell
Cave, Rev. William	Hickman	Singleton, Manoah & family
Craig, Toliver Sr. & wife	Marshall, William	Smith
Craig, Rev. Lewis	Martin (prob. Thomas)	Stuart
Craig, Rev. Joseph	Mitchum	Thompson (prob. David)
Craig, Capt. Jeremiah	Moore	Todd
Craig, Benjamin	Morris	Waller (not John who stayed)
Creath	Morton	Walton
Curd	Noel	Ware
Darnaby	Parrish, James	Watkins
Dedman	Parrish, Timothy	Woolfolk
Dudley	Payne	Woolridge
Dupuy	Pitman	Young
Durett, Peter & wife	Preston	

== Bibliography and further reading ==
- Boles, John B. Religion in Antebellum Kentucky. Lexington: University Press of Kentucky, 1976.
- Christian, John T. "Chapter 1—The Baptists in Kentucky," in "Part 3 The Period of Growth and Organization," in Of the United States From the First Settlement of the Country to the Year 1845, volume 2 of A History of the Baptists. Texarkana, TX: Bogard Press, 1926.
- Clark, Thomas D. "Traveling Church." In The Kentucky Encyclopedia, edited by John E. Kleber, 897–98. Lexington: University Press of Kentucky, 1992. ISBN 0813117720; 978–0813117720.
- Craigs Church. "History of Craigs Church."
- Crews, Clyde F. "Religion." In The Kentucky Encyclopedia, edited by John E. Kleber, 763–67. Lexington: University Press of Kentucky, 1992. ISBN 0813117720; 978–0813117720.
- Darnell, Ermina J. Forks of Elkhorn Church: With Genealogies of Early Members. Louisville: Clearfield, 1946.
- Edwards, Brenda S. "Gilbert's Creek Baptist celebrating its 225th." The Advocate-Messenger (30 October 2006)
- Ford, Samuel H. "The Church in the Wilderness," ch. 3 of his "History of the Kentucky Baptists" series. Pages 133–42 in The Christian Repository 5 (March 1856).
- Hay, Melba Porter, and Thomas H. Appleton Jr., eds. Roadside History: A Guide to Kentucky Highway Markers. Frankfort, KY: Kentucky Historical Society, 2002.
- Kincaid, Robert L. "Claiming the Paradise Land." Chapter 11 in The Wilderness Road. Indianapolis: Bobbs-Merrill, 1947.
- Ranck, George Washington. The Story of Bryan's Station: As Told in the Historical Address Delivered at Bryan's Station, Fayette County, Kentucky, Aug. 16, 1896. Corrected and approved ed. Lexington, KY: Transylvania Printing, 1896 (esp. beginning from p. 22 on).
- ————. The Travelling Church: An Account of the Baptist Exodus from Virginia to Kentucky in 1781 under the Leadership of Rev. Lewis Craig and Capt. William Ellis. Kentucky Culture Series 18. Louisville, KY: Press of Baptist Book Concern, 1891. See also a slightly shorter 1981 reprint edited for space and grammar, with several footnotes eliminated or reduced and with punctuation, spelling, and capitalization conformed to modern usage in George W. Ranck, "'The Travelling Church': An Account of the Baptist Exodus from Virginia to Kentucky in 1781," The Register of the Kentucky Historical Society 79 (1981): 240–65.
