= Old Order Brethren =

Old Order Brethren are Old Order plain groups of the Schwarzenau Brethren, as well as the River Brethren—both Anabaptist Christian traditions. There are five of these “Old Order” groups of the Schwarzenau Brethren:

- Old German Baptist Brethren, emerged 1881, with about 4,500 members the largest of these Old Order groups and more liberal than the following three groups.
- Old Brethren, emerged 1913, with about 250 members in 2000, a bit more conservative than the Old German Baptist Brethren, with decision making authority being in the local congregations rather than Annual Meeting, but in many aspects similar to the OGBB.
- Old Order German Baptist Brethren, emerged 1921, with about 125 members in 2000, a horse and buggy group that uses tractors for field and agricultural work.
- Old Brethren German Baptists, emerged 1939, with about 130 members in 2015, a horse and buggy group that also uses horses for field work, the most conservative group.
- Old German Baptist Brethren, New Conference, emerged 2009, with about 2,800 members, a more liberal split from the Old German Baptist Brethren.

The Old Order River Brethren are divided into three subgroups.
