= Peace churches =

Christian churches advocating pacifism

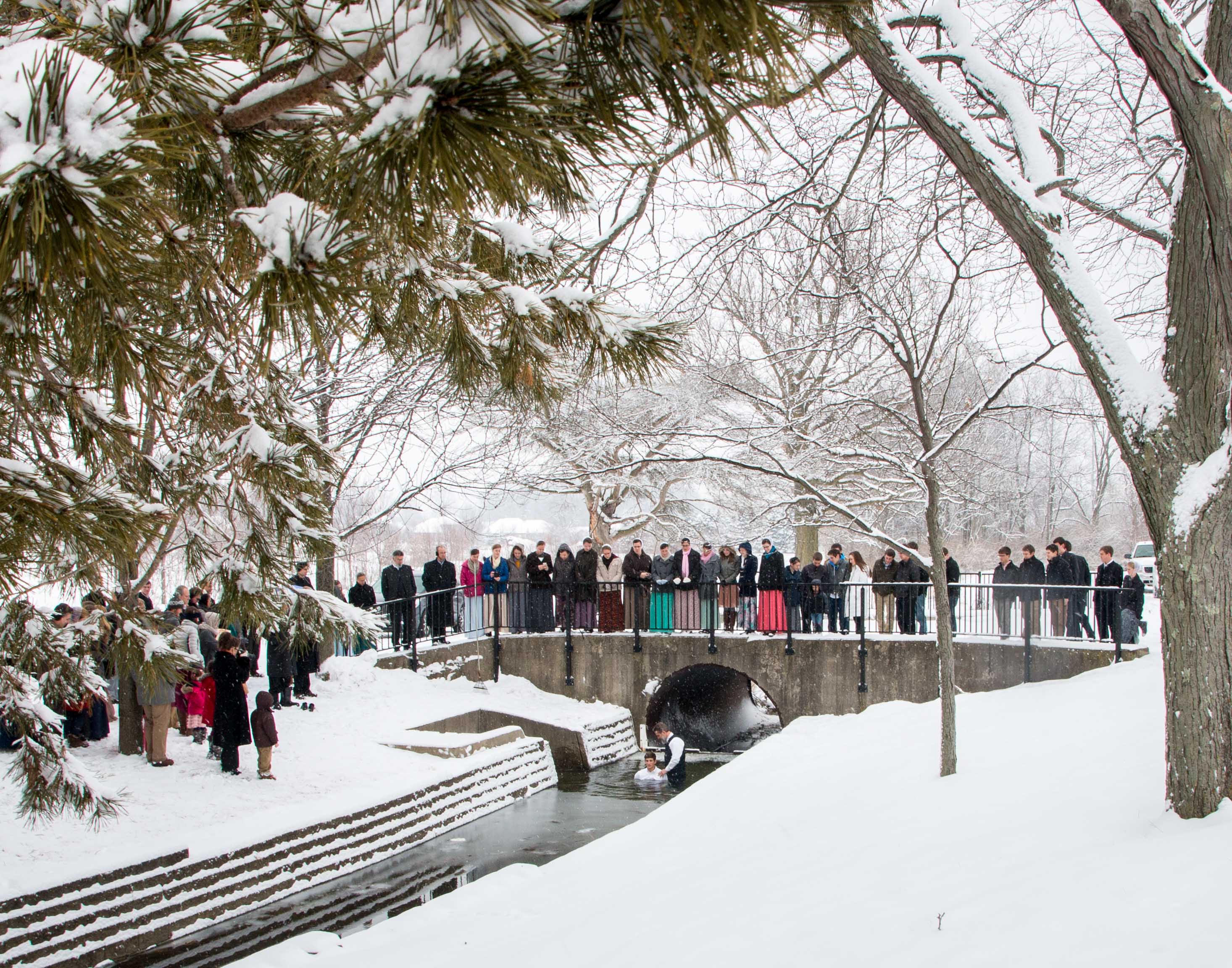
The Schwarzenau Brethren ordinance of baptism by trine immersion is celebrated by the Salem Congregation of the Old German Baptist Brethren Church, New Conference

Peace churches are Christian churches, groups or communities advocating Christian pacifism or Biblical nonresistance. The term historic peace churches refers specifically only to three church groups among pacifist churches:

- Church of the Brethren, including all daughter churches such as the Old German Baptist Brethren, Old Brethren and Dunkard Brethren;
- Other Anabaptists, including Mennonites, Amish, and Hutterites;
- Religious Society of Friends (Quakers)

In addition to the Schwarzenau Brethren and Mennonites, other Anabaptist Christian fellowships, such as the Hutterian Brethren, River Brethren, Apostolic Christian Church and Bruderhof teach the doctrine of nonresistance as well.

This phrase has been used since the first conference of the peace churches in Kansas in 1935.

The definition of "peace churches" is sometimes expanded to include Christadelphians (from 1863), Jehovah's Witnesses and others who did not participate in the conference of the "historic peace churches" in Kansas in 1935.

The peace churches agree that Jesus advocated nonviolence. Whether physical force can ever be justified in defending oneself is controversial. Most believers adhere strictly to a moral attitude of nonresistance in the face of violence. These churches generally concur that violence on behalf of nations and their governments is contrary to Christian morality, but agree that the teachings of Jesus were to explain the principles of the Kingdom of God rather than and contrasted with the ways of any earthly government.

== History ==
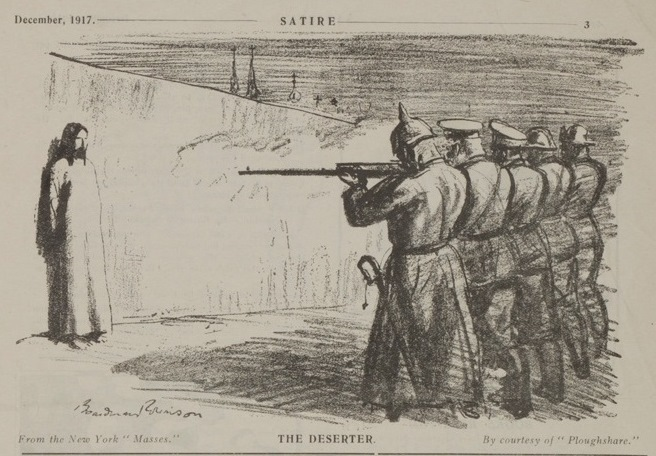
The Deserter (1916) by Boardman Robinson

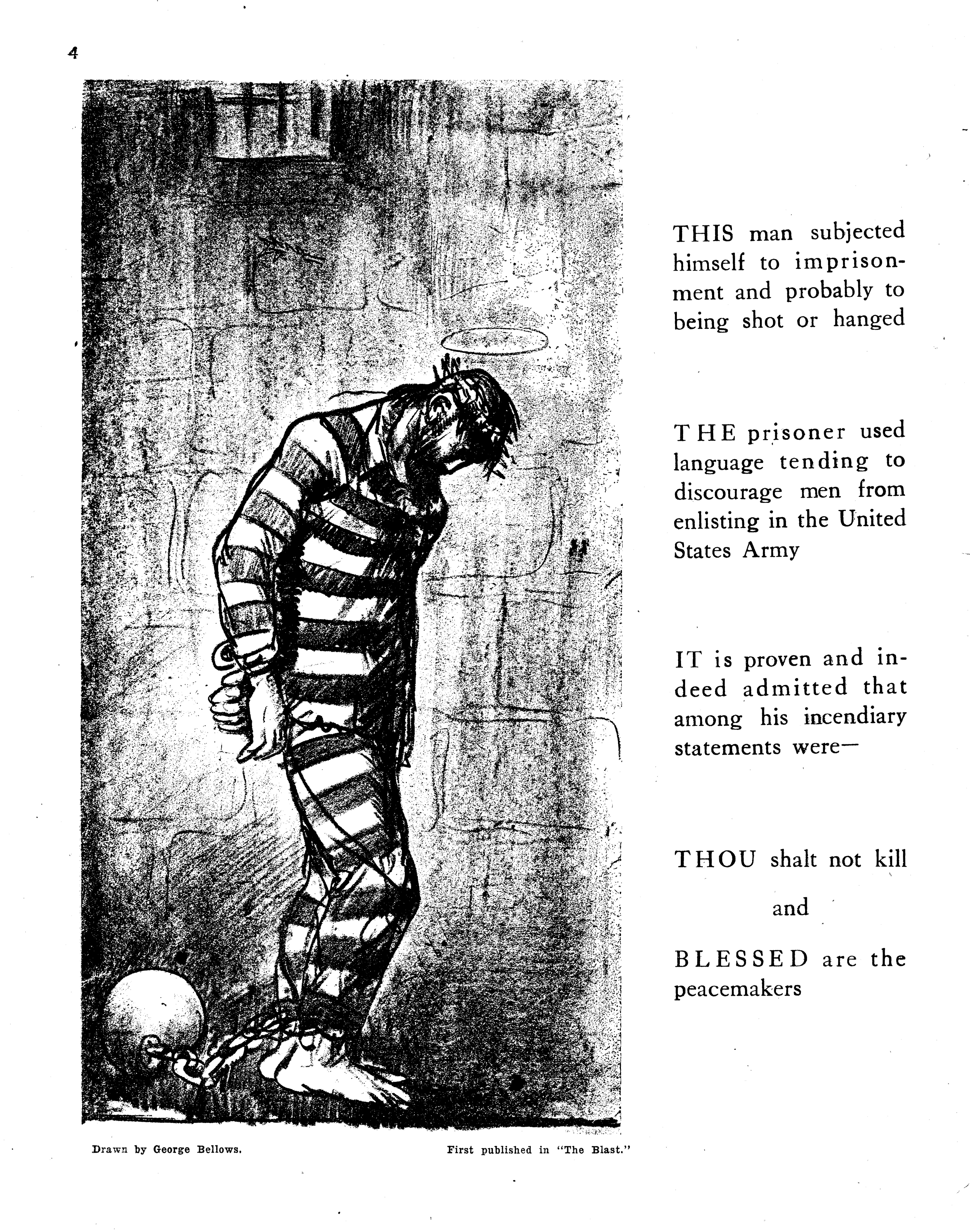
Blessed are the Peacemakers (1917) by George Bellows

Among all Christian denominations, there have always been groups of members who advocate nonviolence, but certain churches have consistently supported it since their foundation. Besides the three historic peace churches, they include denominations of the Anabaptist tradition (Dunkard Brethren, Bruderhof Communities, Amish, Old Order Mennonites, Conservative Mennonites, Holdeman Mennonites, Hutterites, Old German Baptist Brethren, Old Order River Brethren, the Brethren in Christ, the Apostolic Christian Church and others in the Anabaptist tradition); Doukhobors, Molokans, Dukh-i-zhizniki, Schwenkfelders, Moravians, the Shakers, a number of denominations in the Holiness Methodist tradition, and even some groups within the Pentecostal movement. The largest Finished Work Pentecostal denomination, the Assemblies of God, abandoned pacifism around the time of the Second World War. These groups have disagreed, both internally and with each other, about the propriety of non-combatant military roles, such as unarmed medical personnel, or performing non-battlefield services that assist nations in wartime, such as manufacturing munitions. One position might argue that Jesus would never object to helping people who are suffering, while another might object that doing so contributes indirectly to violence by freeing other people to engage in it. Most peace churches support alternative service options such as service to refugees or in hospitals, as long as they are not associated with the military.

In America the first conference of historic peace churches was held in 1935 in Kansas. Five years later in Canada, the Conference of Historic Peace Churches was formed in Ontario in 1940, headed by Harold Sherk to represent Mennonite, Brethren, and Quaker churches as they sought exemption from military service.

At one time, active membership in and acceptance of the beliefs of one of the peace churches was required for obtaining conscientious objector status in the United States, and hence exemption from military conscription, or for those already in the military, honorable discharge. But after a series of court rulings, this requirement was dropped. In the United States, one may now claim conscientious objector status based on a personal belief system that need not be Christian, nor even based on religion.

Peace churches, especially those with sufficient financial and organizational resources, have attempted to heal the ravages of war without favoritism. This has often aroused controversy, as when the Quakers sent large shipments of food and medicine to North Vietnam during the Vietnam War, and to U.S.-embargoed Cuba. Richard Nixon, the 37th President of the United States, was a birthright member of the Religious Society of Friends (Quakers) and was never formally disowned by any meeting. The American Friends Service Committee and the Mennonite Central Committee are two charitable denominational agencies set up to provide such healing.

In the 1980s, the Quakers, Brethren, and Mennonites came together to create Christian Peacemaker Teams, an international organization that works to reduce violence and systematic injustice in regions of conflict. This was motivated by the desire for Christians to take peacemaking as seriously as soldiers and governments take war-making.

== Other Christian pacifist groups ==
=== Christadelphians, 1863 ===
The Christadelphians are one of only a small number of churches whose identity as a denomination is directly linked to the issue of Christian pacifism. Although the grouping which later took the name "Christadelphian" had largely separated from the Campbellite movement in Scotland and America after 1848, it was conscription in the American Civil War which caused their local church in Ogle County, Illinois, to register as conscientious objectors in 1863 under the name "Christadelphians." When the First World War was imminent Christadelphians in the British Empire took the same stance, though frequently faced military tribunals. During the Second World War Christadelphians were exempted and performed civil work – though some of the small number of Christadelphians in Germany were imprisoned and one executed. The position was maintained through the Korean War, Vietnam War and today.

=== Doukhobors ===
The Doukhobors are a Spiritual Christian denomination that advocate pacifism. On 29 June 1895, the Doukhobors, in what is known as the "Burning of the Arms", "piled up their swords, guns, and other weapons and burned them in large bonfires while they sang psalms".

=== Holiness Pacifists ===
The Emmanuel Association, Reformed Free Methodist Church, Immanuel Missionary Church, Church of God (Guthrie, Oklahoma), First Bible Holiness Church and Christ's Sanctified Holy Church are denominations in the holiness movement known for their opposition to war today; they are known as "Holiness Pacifists". The Emmanuel Association, for example, teaches:

We feel bound explicitly to avow our unshaken persuasion that War is utterly incompatible with the plain precepts of our divine Lord and Law-giver, and with the whole spirit of the Gospel; and that no plea of necessity or policy, however urgent or peculiar, can avail to release either individuals or nations for the paramount allegiance which they owe to Him who hath said, "Love your enemies." Therefore, we cannot participate in war (Rom. 12:19), war activities, or compulsory training.

=== Seventh-day Adventist Church, 1867 ===
Adventists had sought and obtained exemption as conscientious objectors in 1864, and the Seventh-day Adventist Church from 1914 has a long history of noncombatancy service within and outside the military. In practice today, as a pastor from the Seventh-day Adventist church comments in an online magazine run by members of the Seventh-Day Adventist church: "Today in a volunteer army a lot of Adventist young men and women join the military in combat positions, and there are many Adventist pastors electing for military chaplaincy positions, supporting combatants and non-combatants alike. On Veteran’s Day, American churches across the country take time to give honor and respect to those who “served their country,” without any attempt to differentiate how they served, whether as bomber pilots, Navy Seals, or Operation Whitecoat guinea pigs. I have yet to see a service honoring those who ran away to Canada to avoid participation in the senseless carnage of Vietnam in their Biblical pacifism."

=== Churches of God (7th day) ===
The different groups evolving under the name Church of God (7th day) stand opposed to carnal warfare, based on Matthew 26:52; Revelation 13:10; Romans 12:19–21. They believe the weapons of their warfare to not be carnal but spiritual (II Corinthians 10:3–5; Ephesians 6:11–18).

=== Molokans ===
The Molokans are a Spiritual Christian denomination that advocate pacifism. They have historically been persecuted for failing to bear arms.

== Partially pacifist groups ==
=== Community of Christ ===
Although non-credal and not explicitly pacifist, the Community of Christ (formerly known as the Reorganized Church of Jesus Christ of Latter Day Saints) is emerging as an international peace church through such ministries as the Community of Christ International Peace Award, the Daily Prayer for Peace, and resources to support conscientious objection to war. However, in the United States and worldwide, many church members are active in military service and the church provides active duty chaplaincy for outreach and ministry to military personnel.

=== Churches of Christ ===
Once containing a relatively large nonviolence faction, Churches of Christ are now more conflicted. Contemporary Churches of Christ, especially those that hold with the teachings of David Lipscomb, tend toward pacifist views. This means that they believe that the use of coercion and/or force may be acceptable for purposes of personal self-defense but that resorting to warfare is not an option open to Christians.

=== Fellowship of Reconciliation ===
As noted above, there are peace groups within most mainstream Christian denominations. The Fellowship of Reconciliation was set up as an organization to bring together people in these groups and members of the historic peace churches. In some countries, e.g. the United States, it has broadened its scope to include members of other religions or none, and people whose position is not strictly for nonviolence. However, in other countries (e.g., the United Kingdom) it remains essentially an organization of Christian nonviolence.

== The non-pacifist group ==
=== Jehovah's Witnesses ===
Members of the Jehovah's Witnesses go to prison for conscientiously objecting to military service.

== See also ==
- American Friends Service Committee
- Anglican Pacifist Fellowship
- Baptist Peace Fellowship of North America
- Brethren Volunteer Service
- Catholic Worker Movement
- Center on Conscience & War
- Christian pacifism
- Christianity and violence
- Churches of Peace, three buildings built by and for Lutherans in Silesia after granted permission from Austrian Habsburgs
- Civilian-based defense
- Civilian Public Service
- Conscription
- Diane Drufenbrock
- Doukhobors
- Hopedale Community
- Jewish Peace Fellowship
- List of pacifist faiths
- List of peace activists
- Martin Luther King Jr.
- Mennonite
- Nonconformism
- Nonresistance
- Nonviolence
- Pacifism
- Pax Christi
- Plain people
- Religious Freedom Peace Tax Fund Act
- Seagoing cowboys
- Southern Christian Leadership Conference (SCLC)
- Testimony of peace
- Leo Tolstoy
- John Howard Yoder
- Adin Ballou
