= Brethren Church =

Anabaptist denomination

The Brethren Church is an Anabaptist Christian denomination with roots in and one of several groups that trace its origins back to the Schwarzenau Brethren of Germany, and is a member of the National Association of Evangelicals.

== Background ==
The Brethren church tradition traces its roots back over 300 years to 1708. Eighteenth-century Europe was a time of strong governmental control of the church and low tolerance for religious diversity. Nevertheless, there were religious dissenters who lived their faith in spite of the threat of persecution. Some of these dissenters found refuge in the town of Schwarzenau in present-day Nordrhein-Westfalen in Germany. Among them was Alexander Mack, a miller who had been influenced by both Pietism and Anabaptism.

Religious persecution drove the Brethren to take refuge in Surhuisterveen, Friesland, in the Netherlands. They settled among the Mennonites and remained there until 1729. Eventually all but a handful emigrated to America in three separate groups between 1719 and 1733. Because of growing persecution and economic hardship, Brethren began emigrating to Pennsylvania under the leadership of Peter Becker. Most Brethren left Europe by 1740, including Mack, who brought a group over in 1729. The first congregation in the New World was organized at Germantown, Pa., in 1723. Soon after its formation, the Germantown congregation sent missionaries to rural areas around Philadelphia. These missionaries preached, baptized, and started new congregations.

In 1781 these Brethren adopted the title "German Baptist Brethren" at their Annual Meeting; in 1782 they forbade slaveholding by members.

The group continued to expand and from Pennsylvania, they migrated chiefly westward. By 1908 they were most numerous in Pennsylvania, Maryland, Virginia, Ohio, Indiana, Illinois, Iowa, Missouri, Nebraska, Kansas and North Dakota.

== Split and new formation ==
Expansion across the continent and changes due to the Industrial Revolution caused strain and conflict among the Brethren. In the early 1880s a major schism took place resulting in a three-way split: The traditional Old German Baptist Brethren, the progressive Brethren Church, and the conservative German Baptist Brethren, who later changed their name to the Church of the Brethren in 1908. In total, in the 21st-century United States, 14 Anabaptist or evangelical Protestant groups survive who descended from the 18th-century Schwarzenau Brethren of Germany.

=== Progressive Brethren "Brethren Church" ===
The elements constituting the formation of the Brethren Church were historically referred to as progressives and later, by others, as "traditionalists." Progressives stressed evangelism, advocated for revival meetings, Sunday schools, and foreign missionary work, and objected to plain, non-fashionable distinctive dress, and objected to the supremacy of the annual conferences.

In 1882, progressive leader Henry Holsinger, who was the publisher of The Progressive Christian, was disfellowshipped from the Annual Meeting. He and others organized The Brethren Church in 1883 at Dayton, Ohio, with about 6000 members. The Progressive Christian was renamed The Brethren Evangelist and was published quarterly by the church until the end of 2019 when it ceased publication.

The early years after the division were difficult for the new body, yet they quickly went about emphasizing and developing positions that had estranged them from the more conservative Brethren: education, theological training for ministers, the ordination of women, and home and foreign missions. Like many mainstream denominations, between 1913 and 1920 the Brethren Church suffered from the fundamentalism versus liberalism controversy. This was ended in 1921, when the church adopted a conservative statement of faith and practice. Many liberals withdrew to join other denominations more favorable to their positions. The fundamentalist strength developed and played into a later division.

=== Split with Fellowship of Grace Brethren Churches ===
In 1939 the "Progressive" Brethren Church experienced another schism, with those seeking an open position to the issue of eternal security maintaining the name Brethren Church with headquarters in Ashland, Ohio, and those seeking a firm affirmation of eternal security becoming the National Fellowship of Grace Brethren Churches, since renamed Charis Fellowship, headquartered in Winona Lake, Indiana. An additional issue between the progressive and conservative divide concerned the conversion of Ashland College into a Bible college, where the "traditionalists" wanted it to remain an accredited liberal arts college. The resulting schism effectively divided the denomination along equal lines.

== Affiliations ==
The Brethren Church is a member of the National Association of Evangelicals. In early 2026 the following are members of the NAE;

- The Brethren Church
- Brethren in Christ Church
- United Brethren in Christ
- U.S. Conference of the Mennonite Brethren Churches

They are still affiliated with Ashland University and Ashland Theological Seminary (org. 1906) in Ashland, Ohio, where they also maintain international headquarters.

Brethren historian Donald Durnbaugh organized the first Brethren World Assembly in 1992. They met at Elizabethtown College in Pennsylvania and celebrated the 250th anniversary of the first known Brethren Annual Meeting in 1742. That first meeting gathered near Conestoga in Lancaster County, Pennsylvania. The second Assembly met in 1998 at Bridgewater College in Bridgewater, Virginia. The third Assembly was held by Grace College in Winona Lake, Indiana, in 2003. The Assembly represented some 600,000 members around the world. As of 2003, six Brethren bodies met together in the Brethren World Assembly: Church of the Brethren, Conservative Grace Brethren Churches, International, Dunkard Brethren, Fellowship of Grace Brethren Churches, Old German Baptist Brethren, and The Brethren Church.

The 2023 Brethren World Assembly celebrated the 100th anniversary of the founding of the ministry in Nigeria; the assembly included nine branches of the denominations, Grace Brethren, Covenant Brethren Church, Church of the Brethren, Conservative Grace Brethren Churches International, the Dunkard Brethren Church, the Brethren Church and three different groups of the Old German Baptist Brethren. The assembly meets every five years.

== Beliefs ==
Brethren Beliefs is a compilation of three popular Brethren Church documents. This single booklet contains the complete original contents of "A Centennial Statement," "How Brethren Understand God's Word," and "Brethren Positions on Social Issues." All three of these publications are now combined under one cover for ease of use, cost efficiency, and as an encouragement to utilize all three consistently.

=== Three negatives ===
Brethren adhere to the "three negatives." According to "A Centennial Statement,"

Obedience to Christ is the center of Brethren life. This conviction has led the Brethren historically to practice non-conformity, non-resistance, and non-swearing. In non-conformity, Brethren have sought to follow the way of Christ in contrast to the way of the world. In non-resistance, Brethren have renounced the Christian's use of violence in combating evil, striving, as far as possible, to be reconciled to all persons. In non-swearing, Brethren have sought to lead such trustworthy Christian lives that oath-taking becomes unnecessary. Every believer must live in a way that exhibits to the world the truth and love of Christ.

=== Military and non-violence ===
As a denomination within the peace church movement, it still holds strongly to its pursuit of peace, but within the denomination there are many different interpretations of how this peaceful lifestyle should be lived out. Twentieth-century Brethren continue to uphold the ideal of peace, but the church embraces persons of opposing convictions concerning the role and means of "peacemaking". The Brethren Church is also the only Anabaptist denomination currently with a history of supporting non-combatant military chaplains. According to their website,

On the one hand, some Brethren understand peacemaking as a practice of nonresistance or nonviolence, following Jesus in loving our enemies. Brethren annually reaffirm that historic position as a nonresistant peace church and, as such, provide counsel and support for those persons who, as a matter of personal conscience, hold a conviction of nonresistance. On the other hand, some Brethren understand peacemaking as the responsibility of the state to use force, to defend against and deter evil. These Brethren affirm the role of the state to maintain peace and deter aggression through force and a strong national defense by sanctioning chaplains in all branches of military service and providing counsel and support for those who, as a matter of personal conscience, hold to the conviction of strong military defense or "resistance." ...Our role as peacemakers may be in dispute, but the goal of peace is undeniable.

Consequently, Brethren oppose tyranny, injustice, exploitation, and dehumanization as interpreted from a biblical perspective whenever and wherever they exist. Their materials specifically call for political action, working within the system to vote against candidates or policies which support oppression. In addition to calling Brethren to prayer for peace, they advocate for non-violent resistance in exposing oppression and injustice by raising questions and drawing attention to such evils. Brethren stand to encourage the US government to reduce the threat of all war and to pursue peace through all possible diplomatic means. Brethren encourage the government to pursue peace through summits, diplomatic talks, and negotiations to decrease the use of weapons and warfare. Additionally, Brethren stand to maintain the US military for the purposes of defense and deterrence of aggression only and maintain that the US should avoid being the aggressor in military action.

The history of the denomination is rife with stories of conscientious objection.

== Members ==
The Brethren Church had 17,042 members in 1906, 24,060 in 1916, 26,026 in 1926 and 30,363 in 1936. In 1939 with the founding of the National Fellowship of Brethren Churches, now the Fellowship of Grace Brethren Churches, some 17,000 members left the Brethren Church. In 1956 there were 18,697 members, in 1964 18,013, in 1976 15,920, in 1984 14,229 and in 1996 13,746.

In 2006, the Brethren Church had 10,387 members and 119 churches. Membership is strongly concentrated in three states: Ohio, Pennsylvania, and Indiana, but also exist in West Virginia, Virginia, Maryland, Kentucky, Florida, Illinois, Michigan, Iowa, Wyoming, Arizona, California & Kansas.
