= Conservative Grace Brethren Churches, International =

Christian denomination

Conservative Grace Brethren Churches, International (CGBCI) is a biblically conservative and fundamentalist group that separated from the Fellowship of Grace Brethren Churches in 1992.

In 1939 the National Fellowship of Brethren Churches developed from struggles that occurred within the progressive Brethren Church during the 1920s and 1930s. Later the National Fellowship became known as the Fellowship of Grace Brethren Churches (FGBC). In 1992, due to doctrinal disagreements in the FGBC, the Conservative Grace Brethren Churches, International was formed. A central issue involved in the division within the FGBC was the so-called membership issue. The conservative faction objected to the bestowal of membership status upon individuals who could not tangibly demonstrate their support for the church's doctrinal convictions with regard to baptism, which is traditionally regarded as a triple immersion within historic Brethren circles, in accordance with Jesus' directives in Matthew 28:19. Within a larger context, the division within the FGBC paralleled the division between fundamentalists and neo-evangelicals that was taking place within many evangelical groups. Conservatives within the FGBC felt that the broader group was compromising its standards in the name of pragmatic growth strategies. Division was further cemented in the minds of conservatives with what was regarded as the unjust and ill-advised ouster of a much beloved and internationally respected professor, Dr. John C. Whitcomb, from the faculty of what was perceived as an increasingly liberalized Grace Theological Seminary, which was viewed by many conservatives as having fallen under the dominating influences of neo-evangelicalism.

The Conservative Grace Brethren maintain a 12-article statement of faith similar to the original FGBC statement of faith—which was subsequently radically restructured and revised by the FGBC (now known as the Charis Fellowship). Minor revisions and additional comments added to the CGBCI's statement of faith in 1994 were designed to "conserve" what the CGBCI asserts are the original Grace Brethren tenets, including a young earth creation, the cessation of miraculous sign gifts, a seven-year eschatological tribulation period, the doctrine of eternal punishment as a conscious state of unending torment, the absolute and unlimited inerrancy of Scripture, and the exclusive practice of baptism by trine immersion, as well as the exclusive practice of communion as a threefold ordinance (involving foot-washing, the Love Feast, and the Eucharist). The Grace Brethren differ from traditional Schwarzenau Brethren groups in that they do not uphold the doctrine of conditional security as historically taught in Anabaptist theology.

In 2003 the CGBCI had 46 churches in 15 states of the United States, with the main concentration being in Ohio and Pennsylvania. In 2007, a ministerial dispute over the discipline of a Mansfield, Ohio, pastor resulted in the withdrawal of several congregations from the CGBCI, and the participating congregations dropped to 39 churches. In 2020, the CGBCI listed 35 member churches in 10 states within the CGBCI fellowship in the United States.

The CGBCI supports endorsed foreign missions in Africa, Myanmar, and India.

The Conservative Grace Brethren is one of six Schwarzenau Brethren groups that cooperate ecumenically in the Brethren World Assembly (founded 1992), and with the Brethren Encyclopedia having one representative on the board of directors with the following groups: Church of the Brethren, Dunkard Brethren, Fellowship of Grace Brethren Churches, Old German Baptist Brethren, and The Brethren Church.

The 2023 Brethren World Assembly celebrated the 100th anniversary of the founding of the ministry in Nigeria; by that time the assembly included nine branches of the denominations, Conservative Grace Brethren Churches International, Grace Brethren, Covenant Brethren Church, Church of the Brethren, the Dunkard Brethren Church, the Brethren Church and three different groups of the Old German Baptist Brethren. The assembly meets every five years.
