= Grace Brethren Church =

Grace Brethren Church may refer to:

- The Fellowship of Grace Brethren Churches, emerged in 1939 as a split from the Brethren Church
- The Conservative Grace Brethren Churches, International, emerged in 1992 as a split from Fellowship of Grace Brethren Churches
