= Old German Baptist Brethren Church, New Conference =

American Anabaptist denomination

The Old German Baptist Brethren Church, New Conference is a church belonging to the Schwarzenau Brethren tradition of Anabaptist Christianity. It formed in 2009 as a result of a split among the Old German Baptist Brethren.

== History ==
The Old German Baptist Brethren, New Conference is a denomination of the Schwarzenau Brethren, a tradition of Anabaptist Christianity. The history of the Old German Baptist Brethren, New Conference is part of the history of the Schwarzenau Brethren.

In 2009, a major division was a result of the rejection, by a large percentage of members (approximately 2,400 individuals), of an unprecedented committee report adopted by the 2009 Annual Meeting held near Waterford, CA. The report stated in part, "Members of the Old German Baptist Brethren Church in full fellowship and in good standing with the Church, believe and agree that the Old German Baptist Brethren’s interpretation of NT doctrine is scriptural and has been prompted by the Holy Spirit and it is their mind to remain in this fellowship and to teach, support and promote the unity of the Spirit in the bond of peace. It will be expected that members hearing the reading of this report will be willing to accept the same."

No positions on specific questions of doctrine or church practice before the Conference were addressed in the Report, though the general understanding was that it asked for an affirmation of loyalty to traditional doctrine and practice as interpreted by the more traditional/conservative arm of membership. Conference representatives were sent to each district (congregation) in the brotherhood to determine the willingness of each member to accept the report. Those who refused to accept the report gave their names, which were recorded and sent to the secretary of the standing committee for processing, and they were disfellowshipped (i.e. excommunicated). Members who refused to accept the Report were given 60 days to reconsider their decision without repercussion. Those who remained silent or did not attend the meetings were assumed to be in agreement or willing to submit to the decision, and were retained as members.

A majority of the members who did not accept the Report and were subsequently disfellowshipped participated in the re-organization of a new body, which was organized at a July 3, 2009, meeting in Troy, Ohio, called the Old German Baptist Brethren, New Conference. Several fundamental disagreements identified by the New Conference and adherents included: allowing regular group Bible studies outside of the Sunday worship setting; permitting open outreach & mission efforts; use of email and the Internet; Scriptural application of church discipline as guided by Matthew 18; and preservation of the historical Brethren practice of decision-making by "taking the voice" (or vote) of every member, whereas no discussion was permitted upon presentation of the 2009 Report, and only a vote of affirmation was permitted.

The New Conference Original Polity Statement, declares that "the church must never be elevated to a place of equality with Jesus Christ," reflecting the New Conference's somewhat more individualistic approach to faith, following personal Biblical convictions (in opposition to the parent body's stronger emphasis on unity through mutual accountability and top-down legislating practical applications of theology). The 2018 Conference approved an updated Polity Statement. The majority of the remainder of the departing members have joined similar existing groups of the Schwarzenau Brethren such as the Old Brethren, Dunkard Brethren, or moved on to other Anabaptist church fellowships.

== Gallery ==
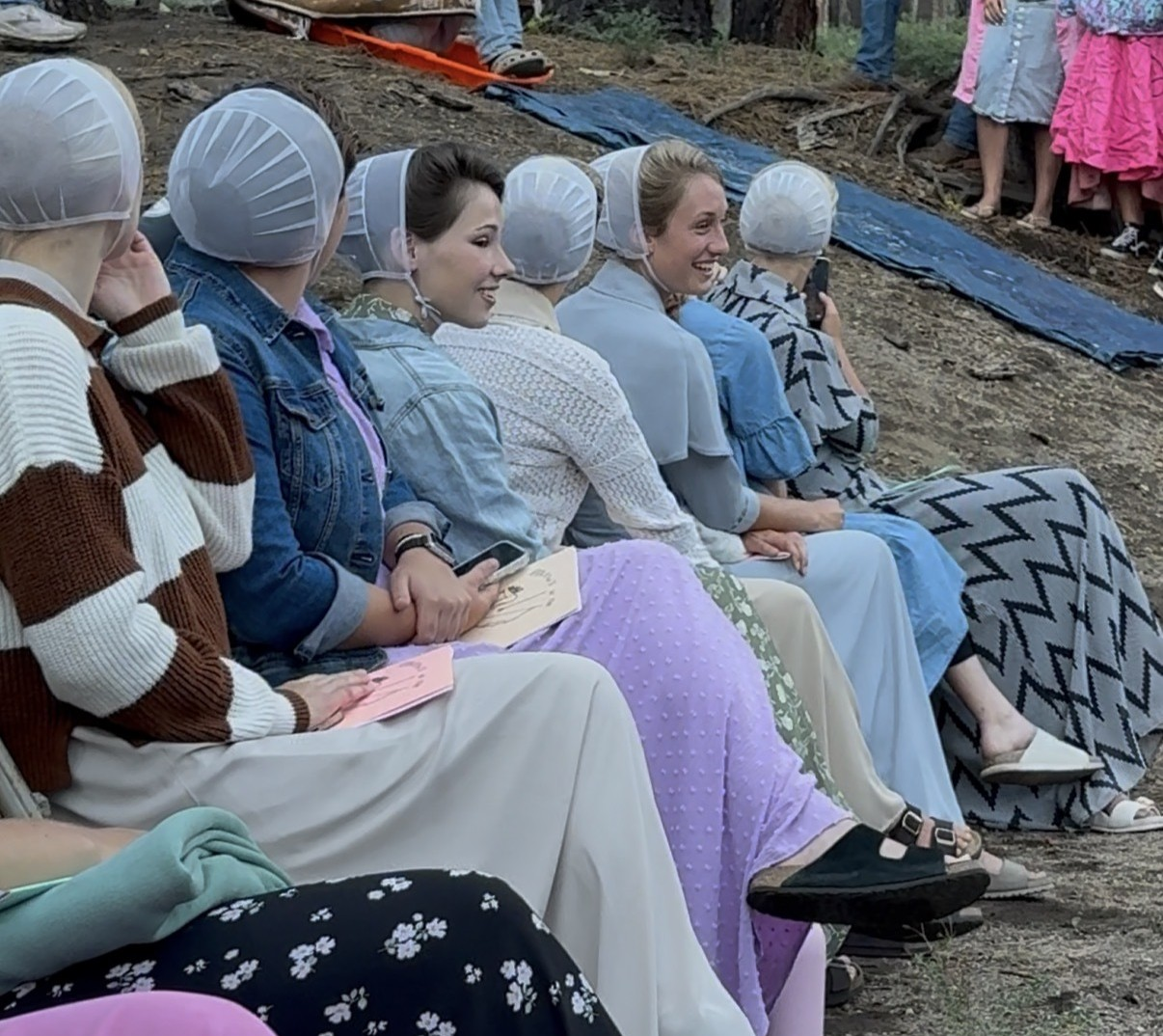
Young ladies of the Old German Baptist Brethren, New Conference watching a skit at Camp Peaceful Pines in Riverbank, California

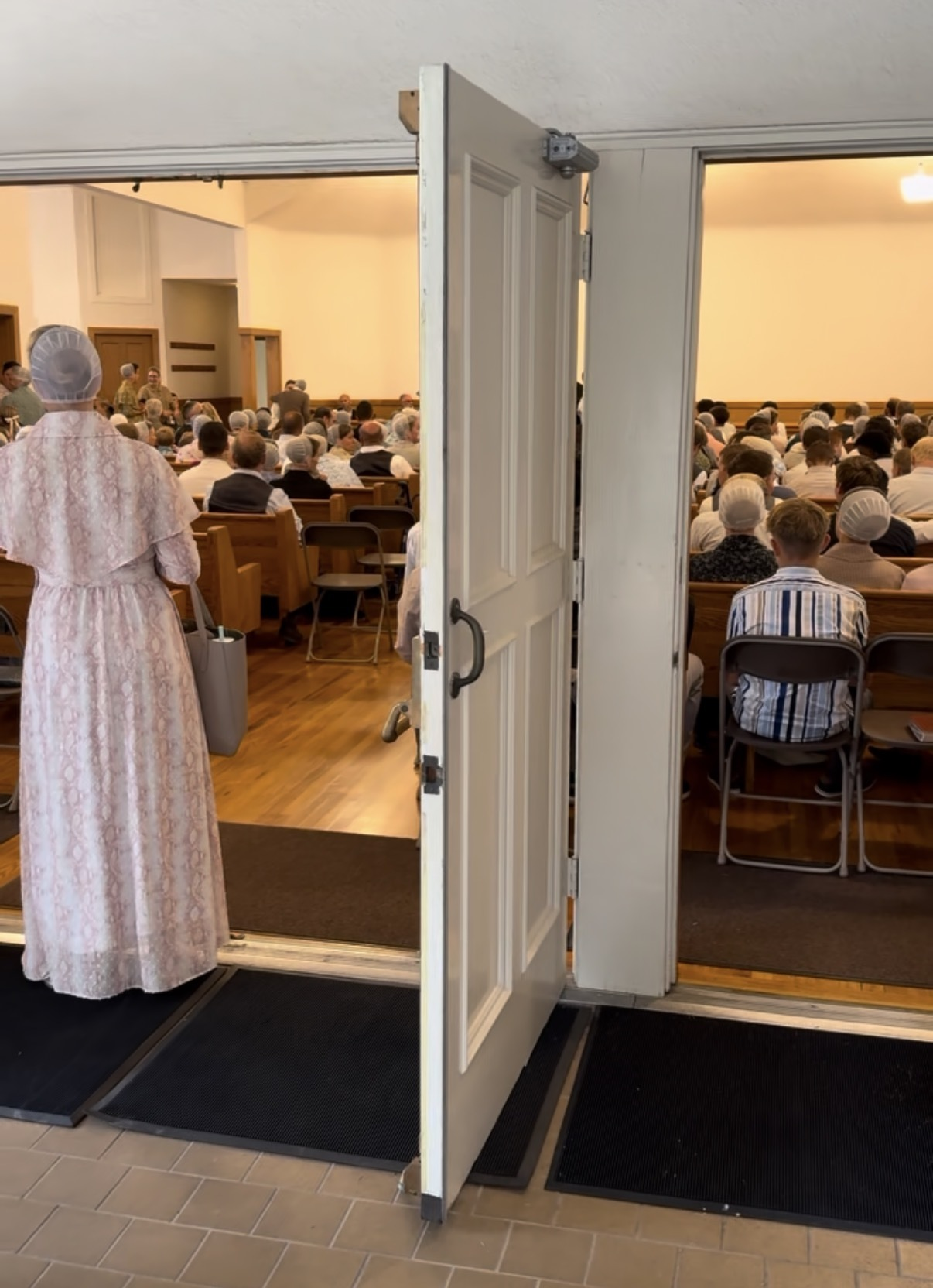
A Sunday morning service at the Modesto Meetinghouse of the Old German Baptist Brethren Church, New Conference (Modesto, California)

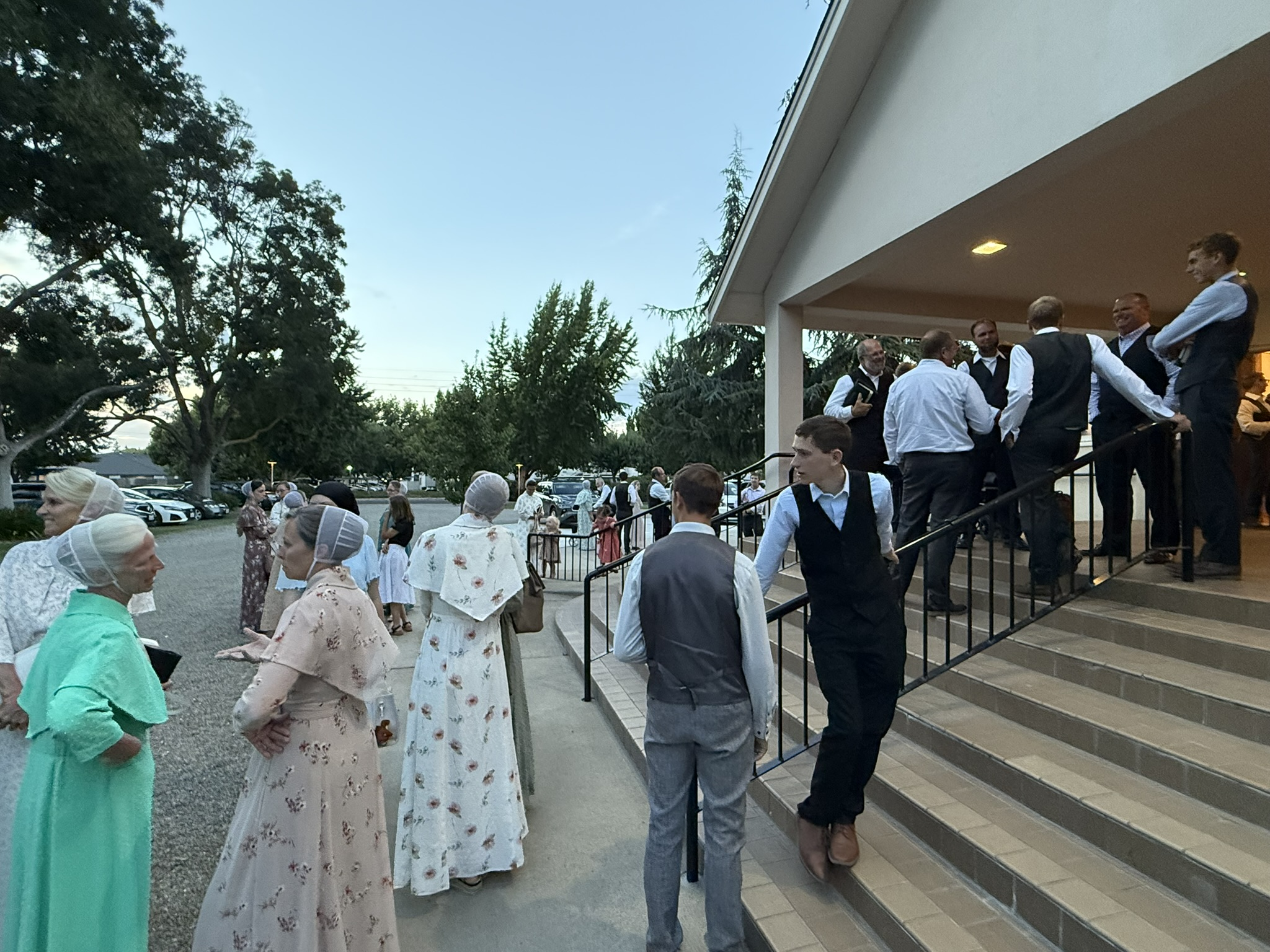
Schwarzenau Brethren belonging to the Modesto Meetinghouse socializing after the Sunday evening service of worship

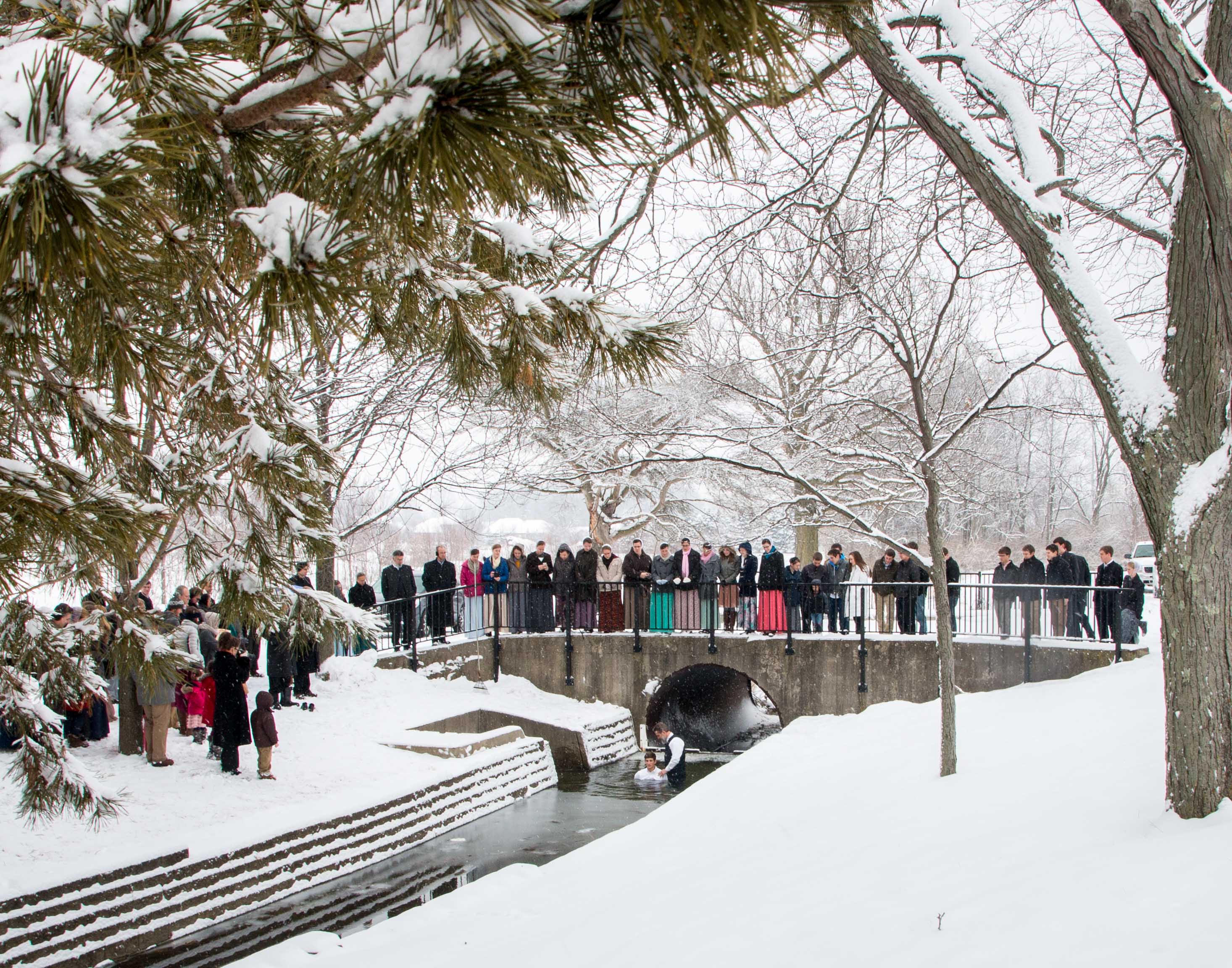
The ordinance of baptism by trine immersion is celebrated by the Salem Congregation of the Old German Baptist Brethren Church, New Conference

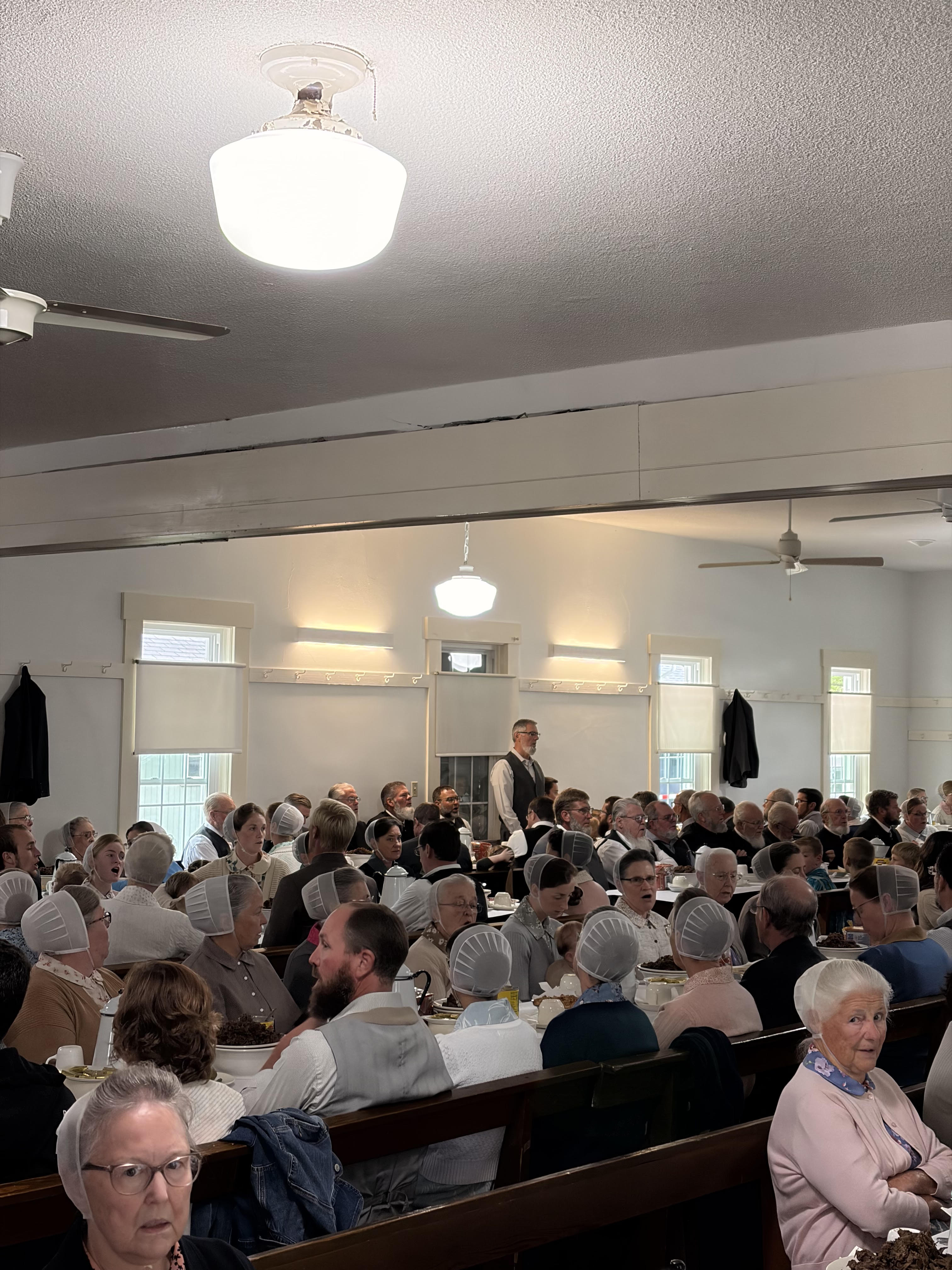
A Schwarzenau Brethren celebration of the lovefeast at the Bear Creek Congregation of the Old German Baptist Brethren Church, New Conference

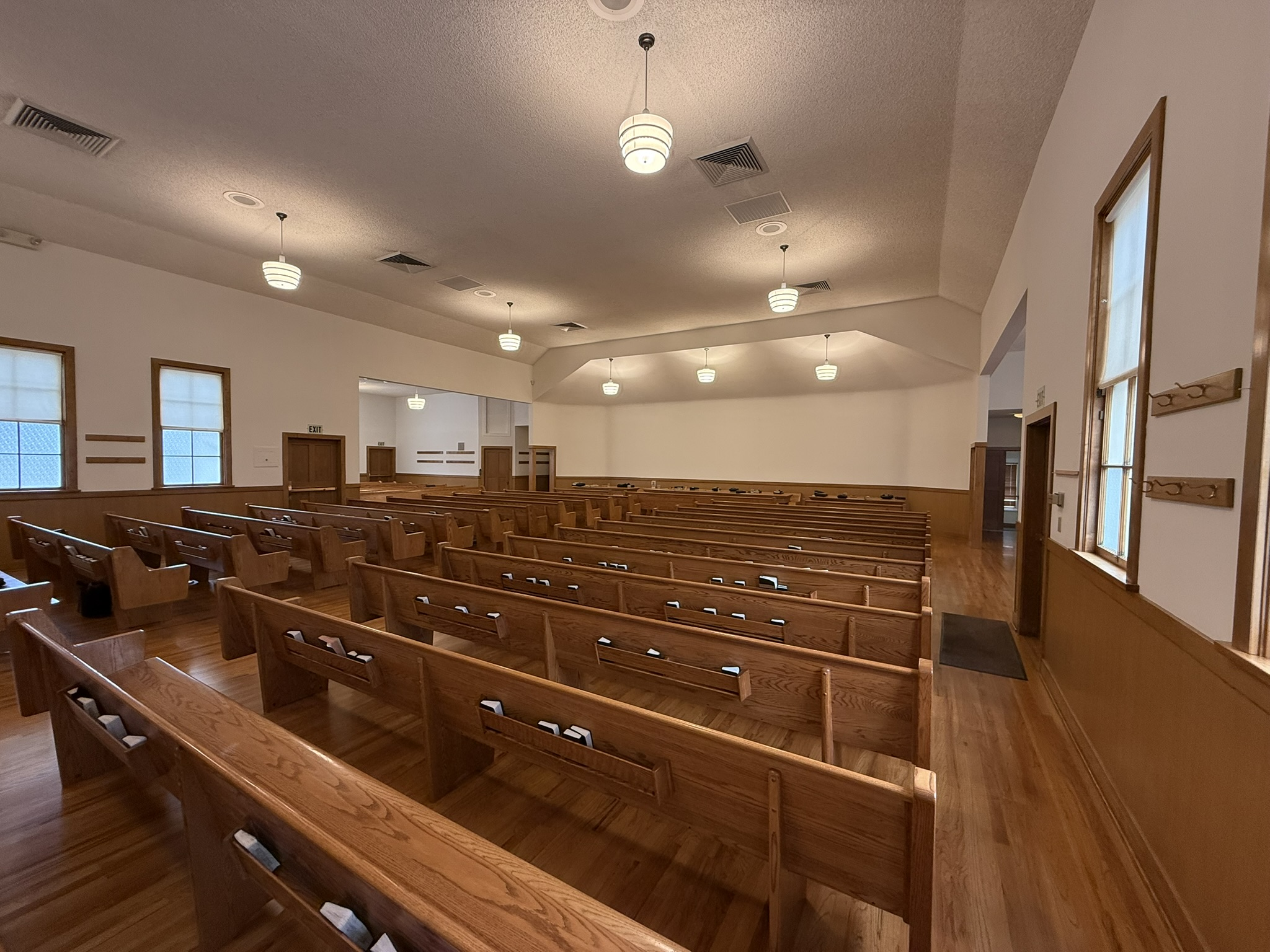
The interior of the Modesto Old German Baptist Brethren Church in Modesto, California

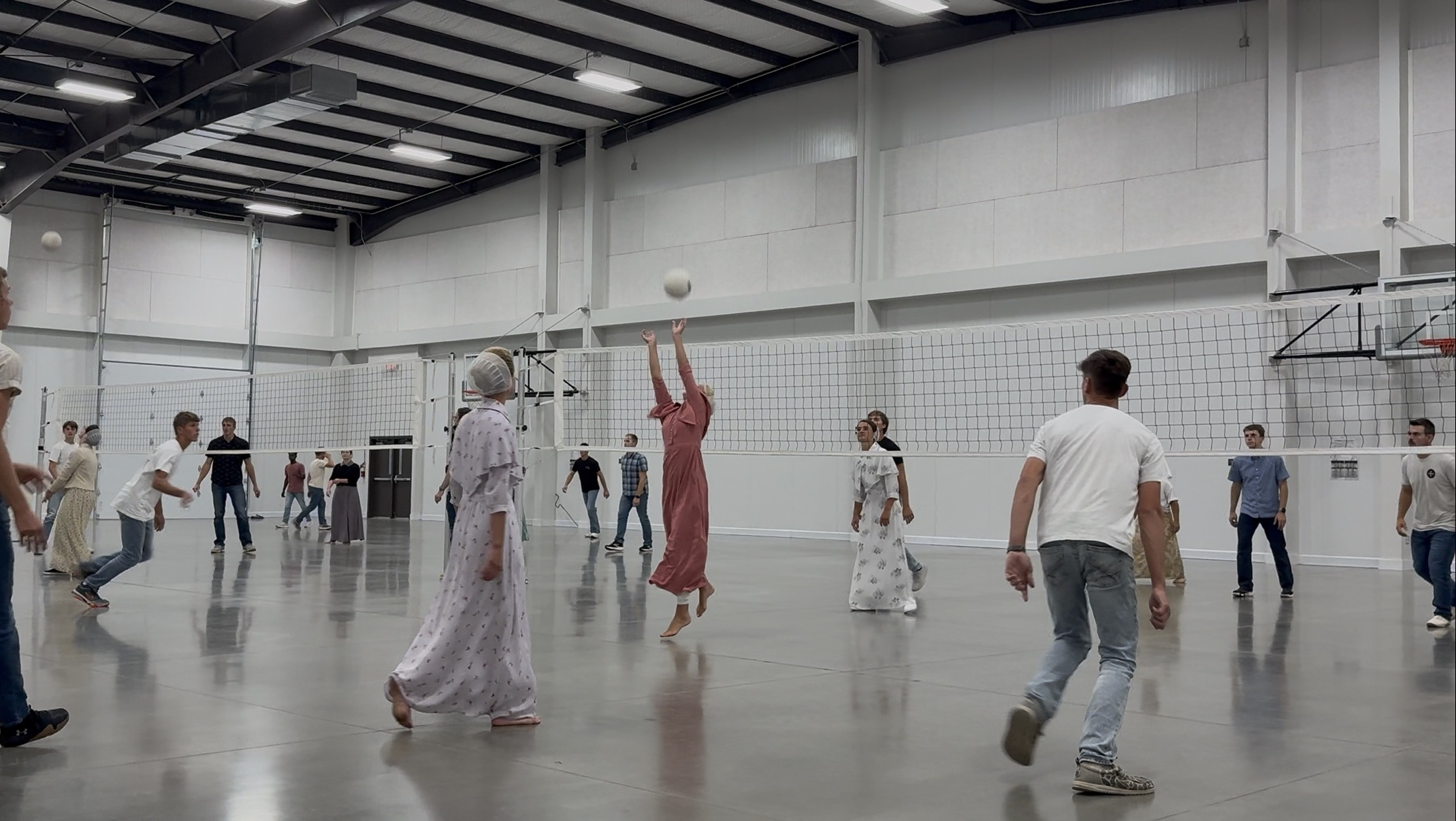
Schwarzenau Brethren belonging to the Old German Baptist Brethren, New Conference playing volleyball at Brethren Heritage School in Modesto, California

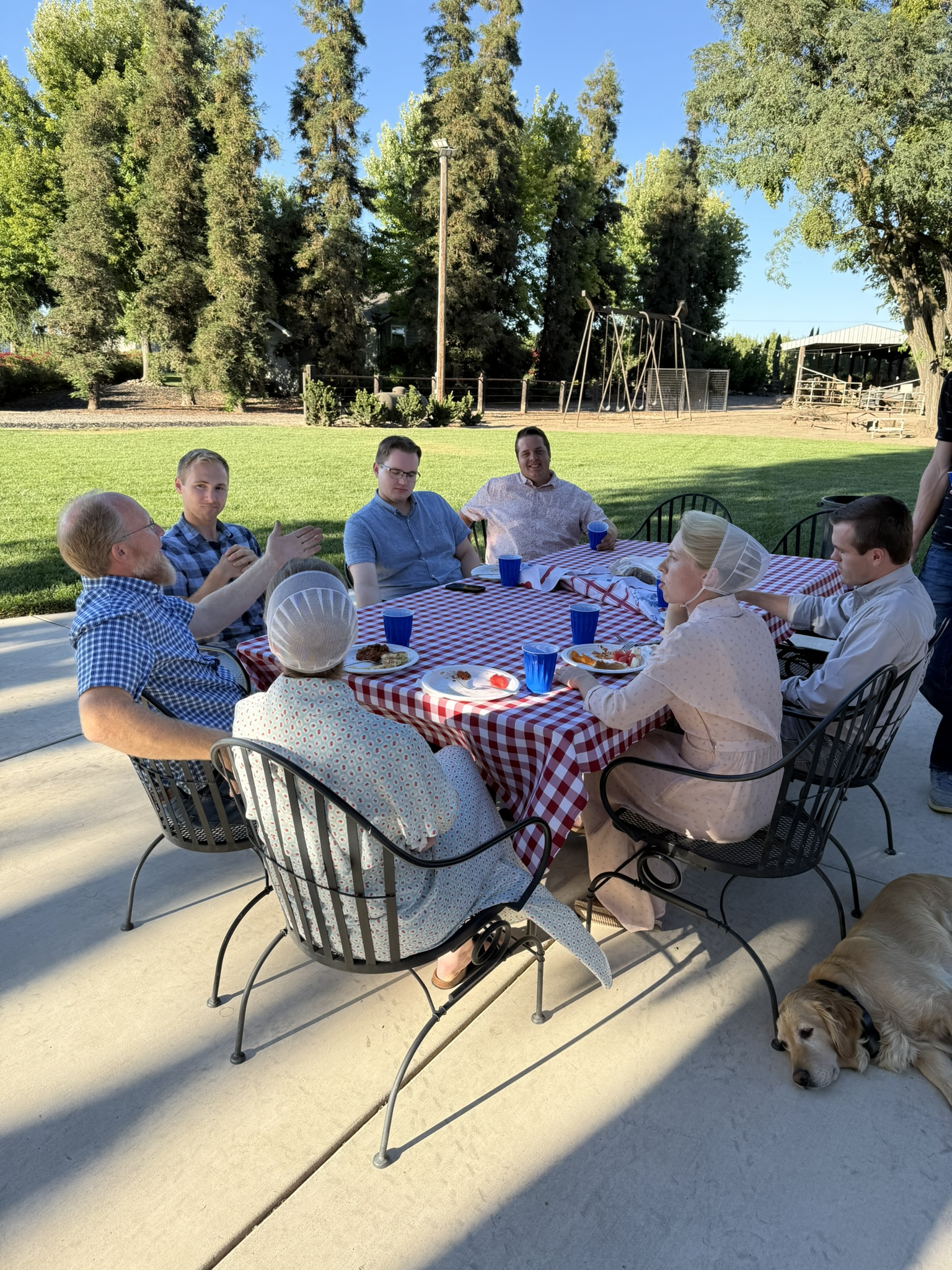
An Old German Baptist Brethren family hosting guests for supper

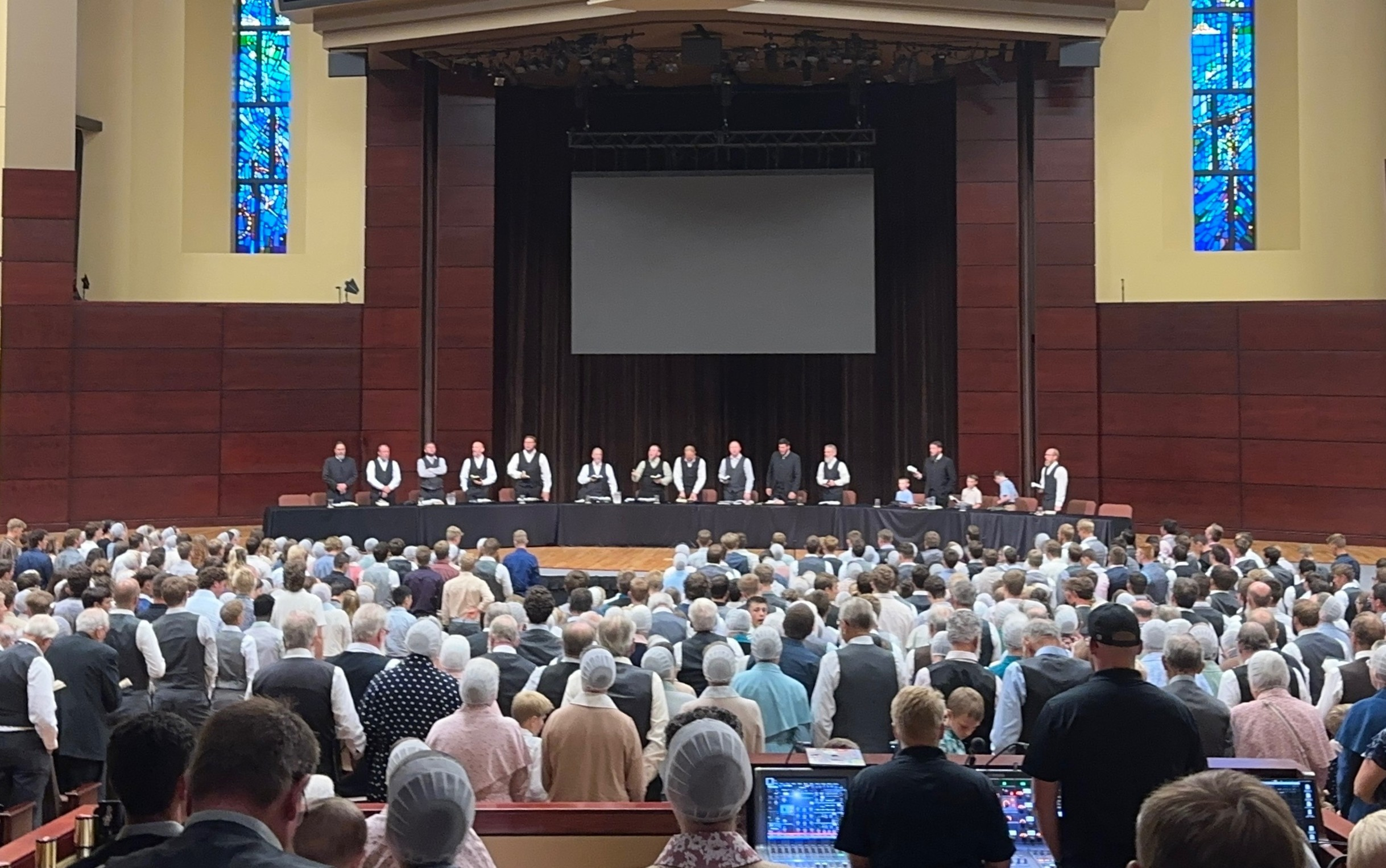
A general session of the Annual Meeting of the Old German Baptist Brethren, New Conference

A singing for young folks at the Annual Meeting of the Old German Baptist Brethren, New Conference

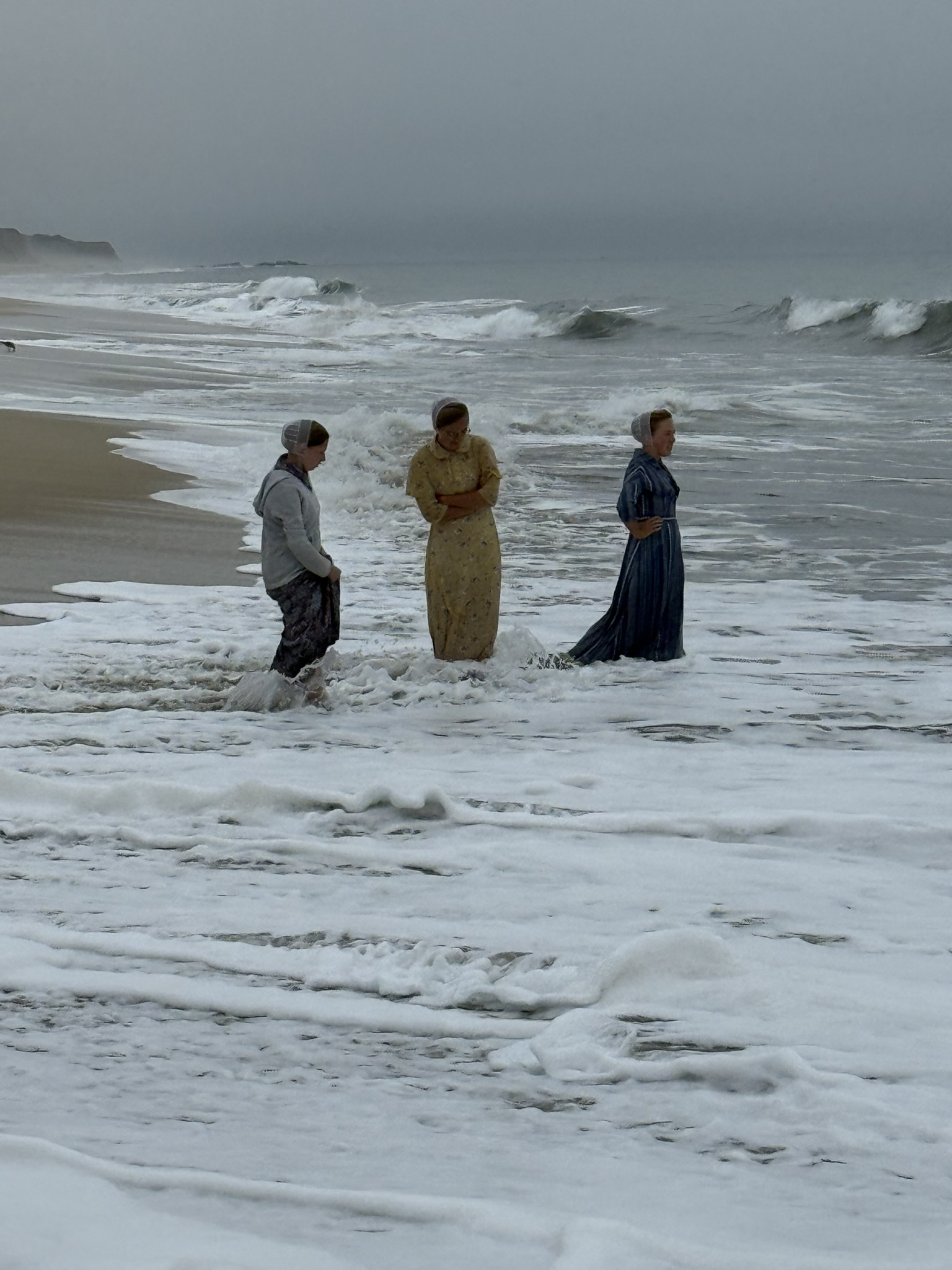
Young ladies of the Old German Baptist Brethren Church, New Conference wading in Half Moon Bay Beach, California

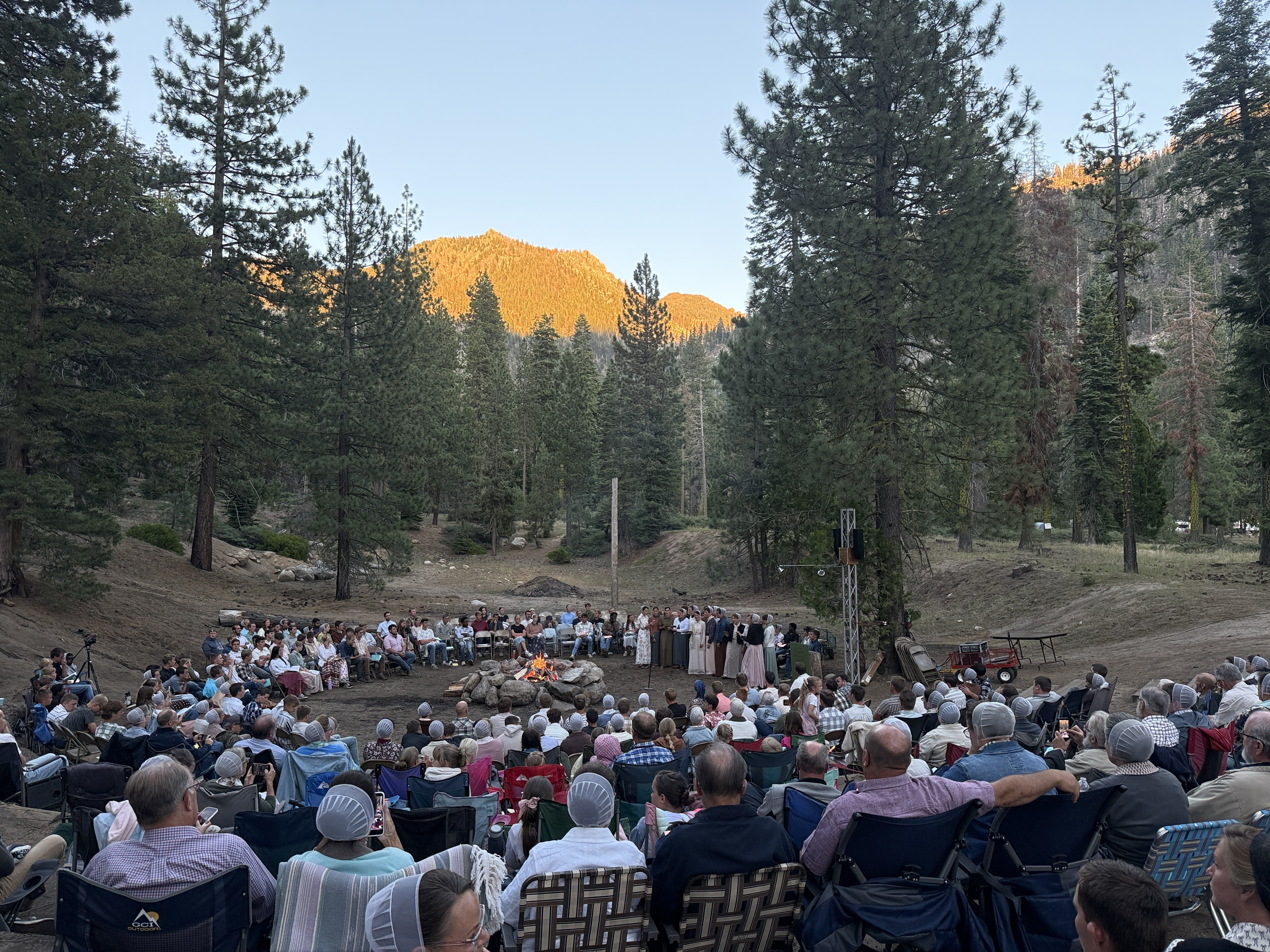
Schwarzenau Brethren ladies of the Modesto Old German Baptist Brethren Church at a singing in Camp Peaceful Pines in Riverbank, California

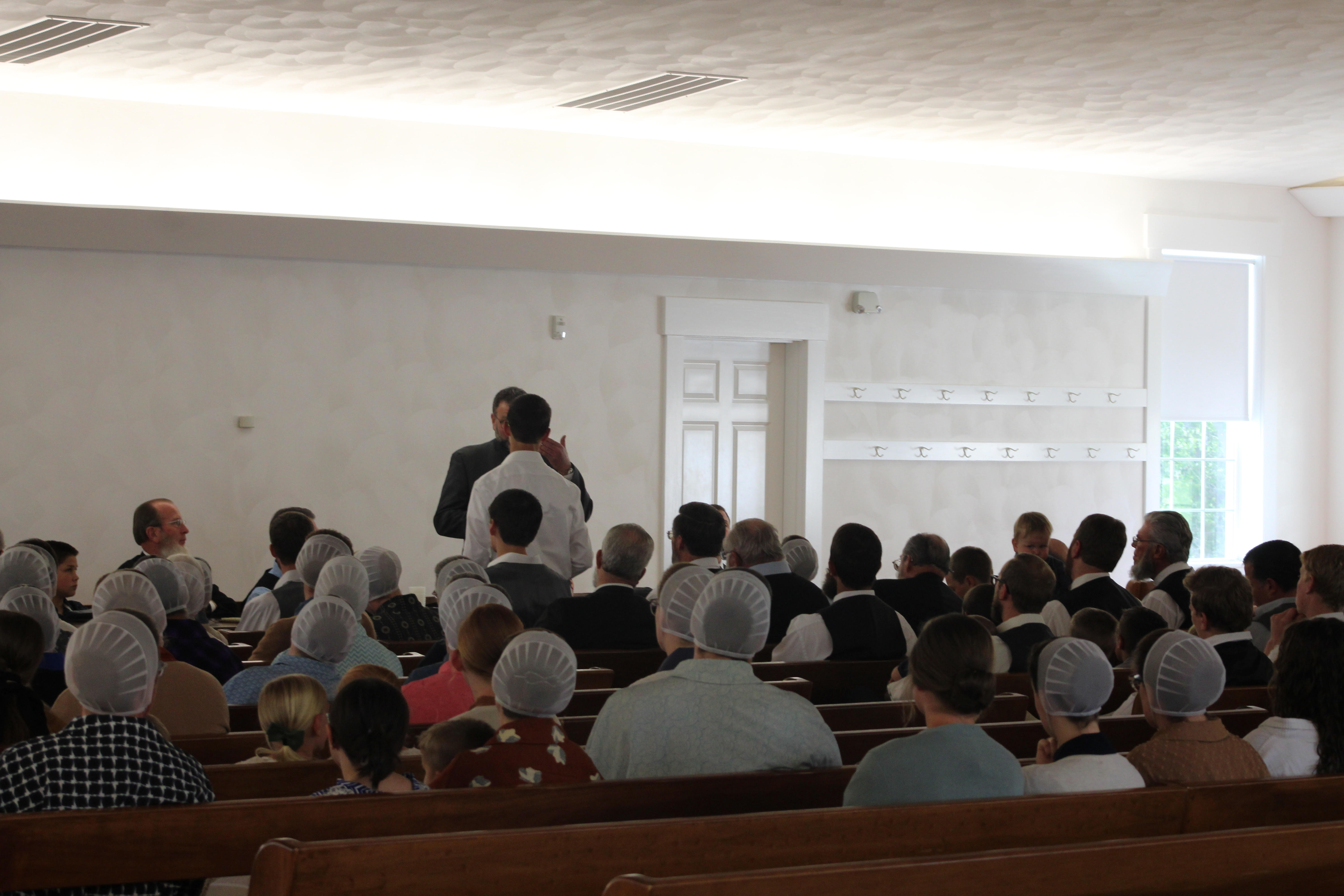
A candidate for baptism speaks to the minister at an Old German Baptist Brethren meetinghouse in Ohio

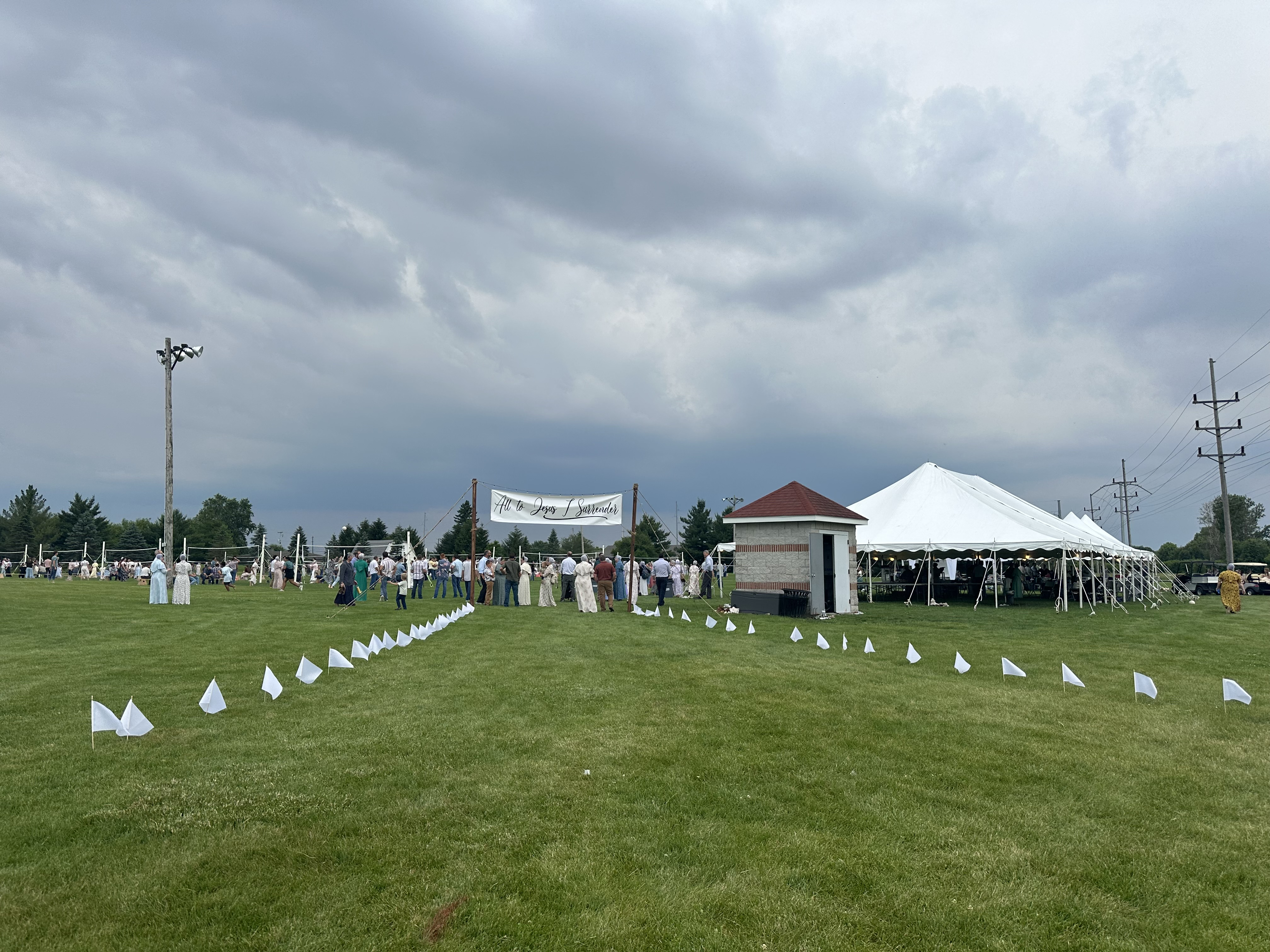
The entrance to the volleyball courts, Dutch Blitz, and chess tournaments at the Annual Meeting of the Old German Baptist Brethren, New Conference
