= Jewish Peace Fellowship =

The Jewish Peace Fellowship is a nonprofit, nondenominational organization set up to provide a Jewish voice in the peace movement. The organization was founded in 1941 in order to support Jewish conscientious objectors who sought exemption from combatant military service. The JPF is currently headquartered in Nyack, New York.

The fellowship is a branch member of the International Fellowship of Reconciliation.

The JPF produces literature about peacemaking, nonviolent activism, and registering as a conscientious objector. The Jewish Peace Fellowship maintains its archive at the American Jewish Historical Society/Center for Jewish History in NYC

== See also ==
- Civilian Public Service
- Peace churches
