= Old Order German Baptist Brethren =

The Old Order German Baptist Brethren, also called Petitioners, are a small group of very conservative Schwarzenau Brethren.

== History ==
The history of the Old Order German Baptist Brethren dates back to 1708, when the Schwarzenau Brethren were formed in Berleburg under the leadership of Alexander Mack. Soon they moved to Pennsylvania to escape religious persecution in Europe. In the 19th century many of them moved west with the frontier, to Ohio, Indiana and beyond.

In 1860s and 1870s the traditionalists among the Brethren opposed the adoption of innovations such as revival meetings, Sunday schools, and foreign missionary work. Stressing church discipline, Annual Meeting authority, and the preservation of the "old order" of church ordinances, worship, and dress, they formed the Old German Baptist Brethren in 1881.

The Old Order German Baptist Brethren split from the Old German Baptist Brethren in 1921, when members of the latter began to adopt automobiles. Though similar to the Old German Baptist Brethren in faith and practice, the Old Order German Baptist Brethren represent those who desired to maintain a strict adherence to tradition, such as the use of horse and buggy for transportation. They also do not use electricity nor telephones but do allow tractors for field work.

== Beliefs and practices ==
The Beliefs of the Old Order German Baptists are in many ways similar to the Old German Baptist Brethren, the group from which they emerged.

The Old Order German Baptists use tractors and other motorized equipment in their farming, while the Old Brethren German Baptists, a similar horse and buggy group, farm with horses.

Men wear suspenders, dark denim and workshirts. Beards are encouraged but not required. Women wear long dresses with the Brethren style cape (Triangular, loose in front and back), aprons and tied white head coverings.

In spite of the name, Old Order German Baptist Brethren do not use the German language anymore, neither a German dialect in everyday life nor Standard German for Bible and church as Old Order Amish and many Old Order Mennonites do, because they had already given up the use of the German language when the first split of conservatives from the main body occurred in the early 1880s.

== Demographics and congregations ==
In the early 1970s there were only about 20 families left in the Old Order German Baptist Brethren church, according to some estimates.

As of 2000 the group had 125 members and a total population of 281 in 3 congregations in Ohio. These Congregations are found in the area of Covington, Gettysburg and Arcanum. They have meeting houses south east of Covington, near Versailles and west of Pleasant Hill. Some members far from the meeting houses meet in private homes, like the Amish.

== Name of the group ==
Since their formation in 1881 and until the early 1900s the Old German Baptist Brethren were often referred to as Old Order German Baptist Brethren. Since the formation of the Old Order German Baptist Brethren in 1921 this then misleading name fell mostly out of usage, but in some few cases it persists until today. The Old Order German Baptist Brethren should also not be confused with the Old Brethren German Baptists, a similar horse and buggy group that split off from the Old German Baptist Brethren and formed in 1939.

== See also ==
- Peace churches
- Plain people

== Literature ==
- "The Brethren Encyclopedia".
