= Church of God (New Dunkers) =

Religious group formed in 1848

The Church of God (New Dunkers) was a religious group that was formed in 1848 by dissidents of the Schwarzenau Brethren (now known as Church of the Brethren).

The Church appear to be indebted to Peter Eyman (ca. 1805–1852) for their origin. In the fall of 1827, the "Dunker" Church in Montgomery County, Ohio, was organized by Eyman, who was the Church's first preacher. Then Eyman moved from Ohio in 1828 to Carroll County, Indiana, serving in what became the Bachelor's Run and Lower Deer Creek churches.

Bachelor's Run was the first Brethren Church in Carroll County. The congregation was organized by Eyman in 1829. In 1838 trouble began between Eyman and fellow minister Peter Replogle, which resulted in a division of Church territory. Replogle started the Deer Creek congregation. Around 1845 Peter Eyman and another minister, George Patton, advocated "variant practices" for which they were disfellowshipped by the Annual Conference in 1848.

The Eyman/Patton group were popularly known as the "New Dunkers", but they called themselves the Church of God, insisting that "Bible things should be called by Bible names". They took the position that "Church of God" was the only scriptural church name. In doctrine and practice, they were close to the Brethren from whom they evolved, faithfully observing trine forward immersion, feet washing, the holy kiss, anointing with oil, and other Brethren practices. In the 1940s, the Church had eight churches with about 500 members, but in August 1962 the Church disbanded.
