= Old German Baptist Brethren =

American Anabaptist denomination

- Abbreviation: OGBB
- Classification: Anabaptist
- Orientation: Schwarzenau Brethren; Old Order Anabaptism
- Scripture: New Testament
- Theology: Anabaptist theology
- Polity: Annual Meeting; plural ministry in congregations
- Region: United States
- Language: English (historically German)
- Liturgy: Nonliturgical
- Origin: November 1881; Miami Valley, Ohio, U.S.
- Separated from: German Baptist Brethren (Church of the Brethren)
- Separations: Old Brethren (1913); Old Order German Baptist Brethren (1921); Old Brethren German Baptists (1939); Old German Baptist Brethren, New Conference (2009); Old German Baptist Church (2020)
- Congregations: 47 (2023)
- Members: 3,598 (2023)
- Other names: German Baptist Brethren; Dunkers
- Publications: The Vindicator

The Old German Baptist Brethren (OGBB) is a Schwarzenau Brethren denomination of Anabaptist Christianity in the United States. It formed in 1881, when conservative members withdrew from the German Baptist Brethren to keep older customs, traditional dress, and simpler worship, and it is aligned with Old Order Anabaptism. The Schwarzenau Brethren tradition draws on Anabaptism and the Radical Pietist revival, and traces its origin to 1708, when eight believers founded a church at Schwarzenau, Germany.

The denomination practices believer's baptism by trine immersion, teaches plain dress, and rejects much of modern culture and technology. Its members are nonresistant, and the church settles questions of practice by vote at its Annual Meeting. Smaller conservative groups left between 1913 and 1939, mainly over the automobile and other technology; a separate body, the Old German Baptist Brethren, New Conference, formed in 2009, and another, the Old German Baptist Church, separated in 2020. The Old German Baptist Brethren had about 3,600 baptized members in 47 congregations in 2023.

== Names ==
The Old German Baptist Brethren were historically called German Baptists, distinguishing them from English Baptists, who have separate roots. They have also been known as Dunkers, Dunkards, Tunkers, and Täufer, all referring to baptism by immersion. Originally Neu-Täufer (new Baptists), the American body used the name "German Baptist" and adopted "German Baptist Brethren" at its 1871 Annual Meeting. From the 1881 division until the early 1900s the group was often called "Old Order German Baptist Brethren". Several unrelated Brethren bodies exist outside the Schwarzenau movement, including the Plymouth Brethren, which arose in England and Ireland in the early 19th century; the dispensationalist teaching of John Nelson Darby has influenced some Old German Baptist Brethren.

== History ==
=== Beginnings ===
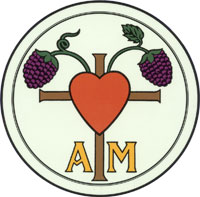
Seal of the Germantown congregation, an early Brethren emblem formerly attributed to Alexander Mack

The Schwarzenau Brethren were organized in 1708 under Alexander Mack (1679–1735) in Schwarzenau, Germany, now part of Bad Berleburg in North Rhine-Westphalia. In August of that year, five men, including Mack, and three women gathered at the Eder, the small river flowing through Schwarzenau, to be baptized as a symbol of their faith. One member baptized Mack, who in turn baptized the other seven. The group held that the Roman Catholic, Lutheran, and Reformed churches had departed from the New Testament, and so they rejected state-church unions, the use of force, and the established liturgy, including infant baptism. They were influenced by the Radical Pietist idea of an invisible, nondenominational church of awakened Christians living together in equality and awaiting Christ's return.

The traveling Pietist minister Ernest Christopher Hochmann von Hochenau was an early influence; Mack invited him to preach at Schriesheim, Mack's hometown. Like others who influenced the Brethren, Hochmann regarded the pure church as spiritual and saw no need for a highly organized one. By 1708, when the first Brethren baptisms took place, Mack had rejected that view in favor of a visible church with defined ordinances: threefold baptism by immersion, a three-part love feast combining communion with feet washing and a meal, anointing, and the discipline of Matthew 18, culminating in the "ban" against unrepentant members.

Religious persecution drove the Brethren to Friesland in the Netherlands. In 1719 Peter Becker led a group to settle in Pennsylvania, and in 1720 some 40 Brethren families settled at Surhuisterveen in Friesland, where they lived among the Mennonites until 1729. Between 1719 and 1733 the Brethren emigrated to America in several groups, and by 1740 nearly all of the Schwarzenau Brethren had relocated to Pennsylvania; they ceased to exist as an organized group in Europe.

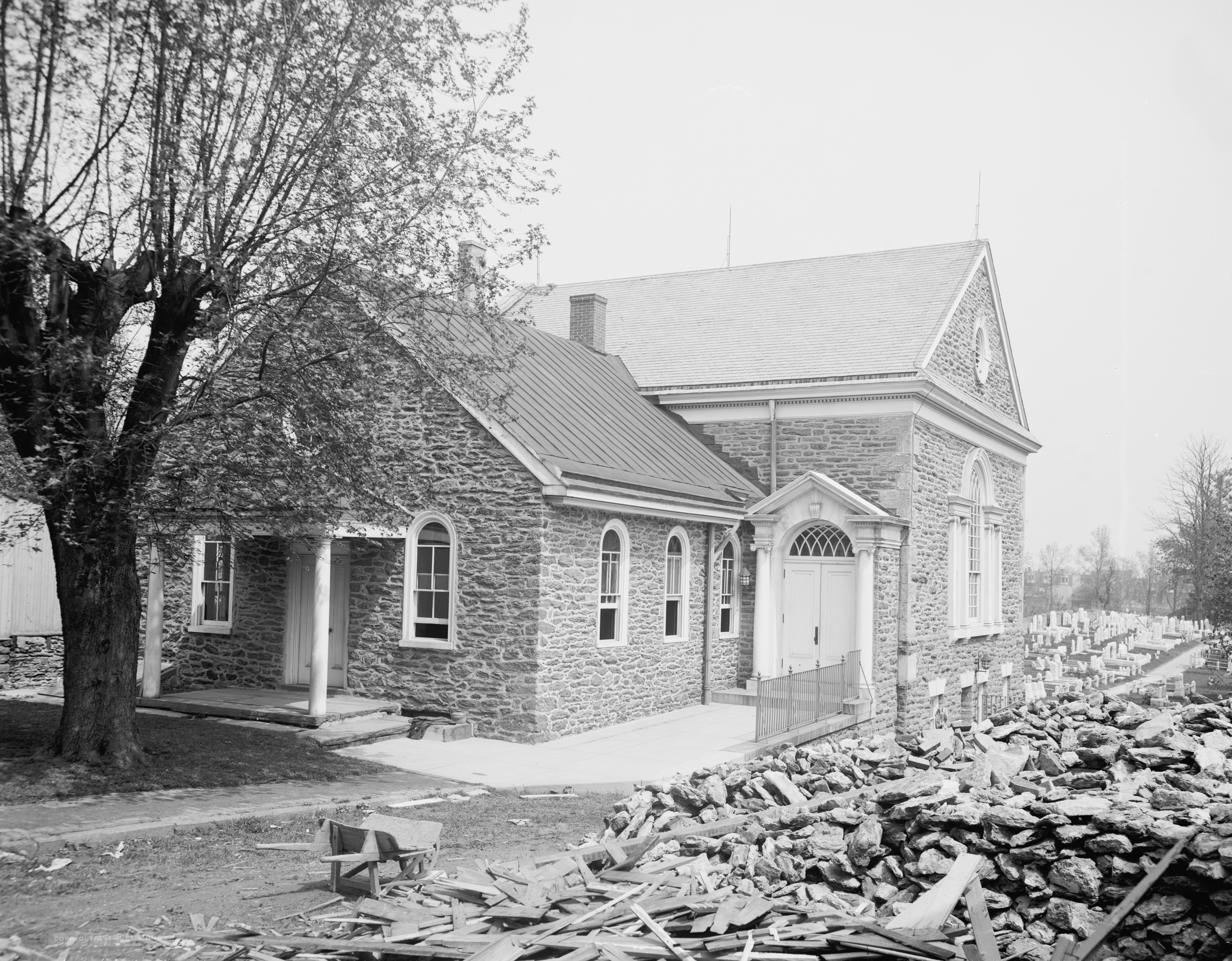
The Germantown meetinghouse in Philadelphia; the first American Brethren congregation was organized at Germantown in 1723

Peter Becker organized the first American congregation at Germantown, Pennsylvania, on December 25, 1723. In 1743 Christopher Sauer, a preacher and printer, produced a German Bible, the first published in a European language in North America.

=== Early schisms ===
The first schism from the German Baptist Brethren occurred in 1728, and more followed after the American Revolution. The first separatists, founded by Conrad Beissel (1690–1768), became the Seventh Day Dunker Brethren, holding that Saturday remained the true Sabbath. In 1732 Beissel established a semi-monastic community with a convent and monastery at Ephrata, in present-day Lancaster County, Pennsylvania; though celibate, it also admitted families who lived nearby. The monastic feature was abandoned after the American Revolution, and in 1814 the society was incorporated as the Seventh Day German Baptist Church, several branches of which still exist. A group called the Church of God, or "New Dunkers", withdrew in 1848 and disbanded in August 1962.

In 1782 the Annual Meeting forbade members from buying or holding slaves, and in 1797 it required those who owned slaves to free them. The German Baptist Brethren grew from about 1,500 German-speaking members in 1790 to a mainly English-speaking church of about 58,000 members in 500 congregations by 1880.

=== Divisions of the 1880s ===
In 1869 and 1880, Brethren in the Miami River Valley of Ohio petitioned the Annual Conference to halt liberalization and return to traditional practice. On both occasions a more moderate version was put to the delegates, which the Miami River Valley group found unclear and rejected. They resubmitted the petition in 1881, and it was rejected on a procedural ground. In November 1881, conservative Brethren led by the Miami River Valley group formally split from the Church of the Brethren to form the Old German Baptist Brethren, holding their first Annual Meeting in 1882.

The conservative faction, which became the Old German Baptist Brethren and Old Brethren, sought to keep plain dress, simple living, and a family- and congregation-centered life. It was cautious toward 19th-century innovations such as Sunday schools, salaried ministers, higher education, and revival meetings, and emphasized literal obedience to the New Testament, which it called the "order of the Brethren". The progressive faction favored those changes, along with liturgical services and missions. Most Brethren held a position between the two.

At the same time, Henry Holsinger, a leader of the progressives, published writings that some Brethren regarded as slanderous and schismatic, and he was disfellowshipped at the 1882 Annual Meeting. He met with other progressives on June 6 and 7, 1883, and together they formed the Brethren Church. The remaining middle group kept the name German Baptist Brethren until the Annual Conference of 1908 at Des Moines, Iowa, where it was changed to the Church of the Brethren. The conference cited the church's predominant use of English, the difficulty the "German Baptist" name caused for mission work, and a wish to distinguish itself from the Old German Baptist Brethren.

=== Departure of small conservative groups ===
In the early 20th century, several more conservative congregations left the Old German Baptist Brethren. In 1913 a group in Indiana formed the Old Brethren, joined by a California congregation in 1915; the stated cause was the acceptance of automobiles and telephones, along with a wish for a simpler Annual Meeting. A further division over the automobile followed in 1930. Those who accepted the automobile placed less weight on annual-meeting authority, treating it as guidance rather than law, and based adherence to church order on personal conviction from scripture and the Holy Spirit. In 2023 the Old Brethren had about 425 members in seven congregations in Arkansas, California, Indiana, and Ohio.

The most traditional Old Brethren, who rejected the automobile, organized as the Old Brethren German Baptist Church on October 5, 1939, near Bradford, Ohio; the new fellowship's origins reached back to cultural changes among the Old Brethren in the early 1930s. They reject the automobile, tractor, electricity, and telephone, and in 2023 had about 120 members in two congregations in Indiana and Missouri.

As the original Old German Baptist Brethren grew more accepting of the automobile, another group withdrew in 1921 to become the Old Order German Baptist Brethren. They reject automobiles, electric power, and telephones but use tractors in the field and on public roads for work. Members of all of these conferences generally call themselves Old Order German Baptists.

=== Division of 2009 ===
In 2009 a major division followed the rejection, by about 2,400 members, of a committee report adopted by the Annual Meeting held near Waterford, California. The report asked members to affirm that the church's interpretation of New Testament doctrine "is scriptural and has been prompted by the Holy Spirit", and to commit to remaining in the fellowship.

The report addressed no specific question of doctrine or practice, but was understood as a request for loyalty to traditional teaching as interpreted by the more conservative members. Representatives visited each district to record whether members would accept it. Those who refused were disfellowshipped (excommunicated) and given 60 days to reconsider; those who were silent or absent were retained as members.

Most of the disfellowshipped members helped organize a new body, the Old German Baptist Brethren, New Conference, at a meeting in Troy, Ohio, on July 3, 2009. Its founders listed several disagreements with the parent body: allowing group Bible studies outside Sunday worship; permitting outreach and missions; use of email and the Internet; applying church discipline as in Matthew 18; and keeping the practice of "taking the voice" of every member, since no discussion had been allowed on the 2009 report. The New Conference Polity Statement declares that "the church must never be elevated to a place of equality with Jesus Christ", reflecting a more individualistic approach than the parent body's emphasis on unity through shared practice. Most other departing members joined existing groups such as the Old Brethren or Dunkard Brethren, or moved to more mainstream churches. Since the split, a few families have returned to the Old Conference and others have moved from the Old to the New Conference.

=== Later divisions ===
After 2009 the body that remained, often called the "Old Conference", decided at its 2010 Annual Conference to continue the ban on email and the Internet, allowing limited use for member businesses already online on the understanding that they would stop within three years. Later requests for business use were met with reaffirmation of that decision. In 2015 a group of nine members worked with outside companies to arrange a third-party system giving members limited access to online information.

After the 2015 Annual Meeting permitted a filtered third-party Internet service run by the "Brethren Resource Group", several conservative congregations objected to the decision and the procedure used. Unable to obtain redress and unwilling to accept the meeting's repeated reaffirmations, members held two meetings on November 11–12 and December 9–10, 2020, on a farm near Greencastle, Pennsylvania, to consider a formal separation. Those present agreed to organize as the Old German Baptist Church, and between 500 and 600 members joined it, mainly from Pennsylvania, with others from New York, Wisconsin, California, Ohio, Indiana, Kansas, Missouri, and West Virginia. Although technology was the most prominent issue, the new group also adopted resolutions on unanimity in decision-making (since modified), caution toward the Internet, stricter plain dress, and the precedence of conference decisions over local practice.

== Theology ==
The theology of the OGBB varies, often along geographic lines. A Doctrinal Treatise, published in 1952 mainly for young men entering Civilian Public Service camps or other work programs, sets out many of the group's distinctive teachings, but it is not a creed or required statement of faith, and members apply its points differently. Asked for a creed, most members say that the New Testament is the closest thing they have.

The OGBB teaches free will and holds that faith and baptism are required for salvation, followed by a life of obedience to the New Testament. When scripture gives no clear direction on a question of practice, members consider it at the Annual Meeting in light of scripture, past practice, and current circumstances, then vote, with chosen leaders counting the ballots. The church strives for unanimity but often decides by majority; an unresolved question is deferred to the following meeting. These decisions are recorded as "Minutes of the Annual Meeting", kept in members' homes, and cover dress, technology, political involvement, and entertainment.

The group's theology was largely shaped by Peter Nead and William J. Shoup, both Brethren authors and preachers; Nead, a trained Lutheran who converted to the Brethren, brought a systematic style of teaching. Its principal doctrinal writings include the works of Alexander Mack, R. H. Miller, and Nead, the essays of Samuel Kinsey, and articles from the monthly periodical The Vindicator, in which devotional and doctrinal essays still appear. The former member Michael Hari wrote two widely circulated books of essays, Brethren Thinking and One Faith.

== Religious practice ==
The Old German Baptist Brethren have historically held to baptismal regeneration, stressing the new believer's obedience through faith, repentance, and baptism rather than the view that the water itself washes away sin; this is the church's official position, though individual members differ. They observe several ordinances, including believer's baptism by trine forward immersion, feet washing, the love feast, a communion of unleavened bread and wine, the holy kiss, and anointing of the sick. They hold an Annual Meeting near Pentecost and publish the monthly periodical The Vindicator.

The Old German Baptist Brethren are a nonresistant body, and their young men usually file as conscientious objectors in wartime. Members do not defend themselves against physical attack, file or defend lawsuits, or use liens to collect debts.

=== Worship ===
Worship is fairly uniform from congregation to congregation: a cappella singing, kneeling prayer, sermons by congregationally elected ministers (the plural ministry, since each congregation has several), and divided seating with women and men on opposite sides of the meetinghouse. The group uses its own hymn book, of which most members keep a copy, with hymns by members and by 18th- and 19th-century authors. A congregationally elected deacon starts and leads the singing, which is slow and usually in four-part harmony or unison; the more conservative a district, the slower the singing. The style resembles that of the River Brethren and Old Order Mennonites.

=== Plain dress ===
The Old German Baptist Brethren dress plain. Women's dress resembles that of the River Brethren or plain Mennonites, such as the Groffdale Conference Mennonites or the Beachy Amish: long dresses and white cloth or net head coverings. The main difference is a Brethren-style angled cape attached only at the neck, not at the waist. More conservative women may wear a loose winter cloak and a black bonnet over the covering when out. Men wear beards without mustaches, button-up shirts, and plain coats without lapels at worship, and the more conservative men wear suspenders and black hats. The beard is required for ministers and encouraged for other men.

=== Restrictions on technology ===
Members' homes have no radios, television sets, stereos, tape recorders, video recorders, or large musical instruments. The church ruled against Internet use at its 1996 Annual Meeting, and debate over the Internet contributed to the 2009 division that formed the New Conference.

== Members and congregations ==
According to the 2009 Directory of Officials, the Old German Baptist Brethren had 6,149 members in 56 churches at the end of 2008. The 2009 division reduced this to about 3,600. The largest concentrations of congregations were in Ohio (16) and Indiana (9), followed by Kansas (5), Pennsylvania (5), California (4), Virginia (4), Washington (3), Florida (2), Wisconsin (2), and one each in Georgia, Michigan, Missouri, Montana, Oregon, Tennessee, and West Virginia; almost 54% of members lived in Ohio and Indiana. In 2016 the Old German Baptist Brethren had about 4,000 members. By 2023 the church had 47 congregations and 3,598 baptized members.

== See also ==
- Peace churches
