= Schwarzenau Brethren =

German Anabaptist group founded 1708

The Schwarzenau Brethren, also referred to as the German Baptist Brethren, Dunkers, Dunkard Brethren, Tunkers, or simply German Baptists, are an Anabaptist group that dissented from Roman Catholic, Lutheran, and Reformed European state churches during the 17th and 18th centuries. German Baptist Brethren emerged in some German-speaking states in western and southwestern parts of the Holy Roman Empire as a result of the Radical Pietist revival movement of the late 17th and early 18th centuries.

Hopeful of the imminent return of Christ and desiring to follow Jesus in their daily life, the founding Brethren abandoned State churches and officially formed a new church in 1708. They thereby attempted to translate the New Testament idea of brotherly love into concrete congregational ordinances for all the members. The Brethren rejected some Radical Pietists’ focus on emotionalism and direct revelation, and emphasized early ("Apostolic" or "primitive") New Testament Christianity as the binding standard for congregational practices. Founding and early Schwarzenau Brethren were also in fellowship with other Anabaptists such as the Mennonites and the River Brethren, and influenced by their writings.

As with many other Anabaptist traditions, the Schwarzenau Brethren are divided into Old Order groups (such as the Old Brethren German Baptist) who practice a lifestyle without certain elements of modern technology, Conservative groups (such as the Dunkard Brethren Church) who preserve traditional theological distinctives while allowing for the usage of modern conveniences, and mainline groups (such as the Church of the Brethren and the Brethren Church) who are assimilated into popular culture and society.

In German-speaking Europe, the Brethren became known as Neue Täufer (New Baptists), in distinction from the English Baptist groups with whom they had no formal ties. In the United States, they became popularly known as "Dunkers", "Dunkard Brethren", or "Tunkers", terms that stem from the German verb tunken (Pennsylvania German: dunke), 'to dip, to immerse'.

== History ==
The Schwarzenau Brethren were first organized in 1708 under the leadership of Alexander Mack (1679–1735) in the Schwarzenau, Wittgenstein community of modern-day Bad Berleburg, North Rhine-Westphalia, Germany. They believed that the Roman Catholic, Lutheran and Reformed churches were taking extreme liberties with the true, pure message of Christianity as revealed in the New Testament. As they began to have the New Testament available in German and read it for themselves, they rejected the established state church liturgies and sacraments, including infant baptism and Eucharistic practices in favor of following plain New Testament practices. The founding Brethren were broadly influenced by Radical Pietism understandings of an invisible church of awakened Christians who would fellowship together in purity and love, reaching out to the lost and hurting in Jesus' name and working together as equal brethren while awaiting Christ's return.

A notable influence was Ernst Christopher Hochmann von Hochenau, a traveling Pietist minister. While living in Schriesheim, his home town, Mack invited Hochmann to come and minister there. Like others who influenced the Brethren, Hochmann considered the pure church to be spiritual, and did not believe that an organized church was necessary. By 1708, the date of the first Brethren baptisms, Mack had rejected this position in favor of forming a separate church with visible rules and ordinances—including threefold baptism of repentant adults by immersion, a Love Feast (that combined communion with feetwashing and an evening meal), anointing, and church discipline according to Matthew 18 culminating in use of the "ban" against members who fall into sin and refuse to repent.

Religious persecution drove the Brethren to take refuge in Friesland, the Netherlands. In 1719 Peter Becker brought a group to Pennsylvania. In 1720 forty Brethren families settled in Surhuisterveen in Friesland. They settled among the Mennonites and remained there until 1729, when all but a handful emigrated to America, in three separate groups from 1719 to 1733.

Peter Becker organized the first American congregation at Germantown, Pennsylvania, on December 25, 1723. In 1743 Christoph Sauer, an early pastor and a printer by trade, printed a Bible in German, the first published in a European language (including English) in North America.

Many members of the Schwarzenau Brethren came from the Southwest of Germany, the same region where the Pennsylvania German dialect originated. Because they settled in Pennsylvania among other Germans, who mainly came from the Palatinate and adjacent regions, they took part in the dialect leveling, that was the cradle of Pennsylvania German. Their language therefore was or soon became what today is called Pennsylvania Dutch or sometimes Pennsylvania German.

In 1782 the Brethren forbade slaveholding by its members. In 1871 these Brethren adopted the title German Baptist Brethren at their Annual Meeting. The group continued to expand and from Pennsylvania, they migrated chiefly westward. By 1908 they were most numerous in Pennsylvania, Maryland, Virginia, Ohio, Indiana, Illinois, Iowa, Missouri, Nebraska, Kansas, North Dakota, Arkansas, and California.

== Beliefs and practices ==
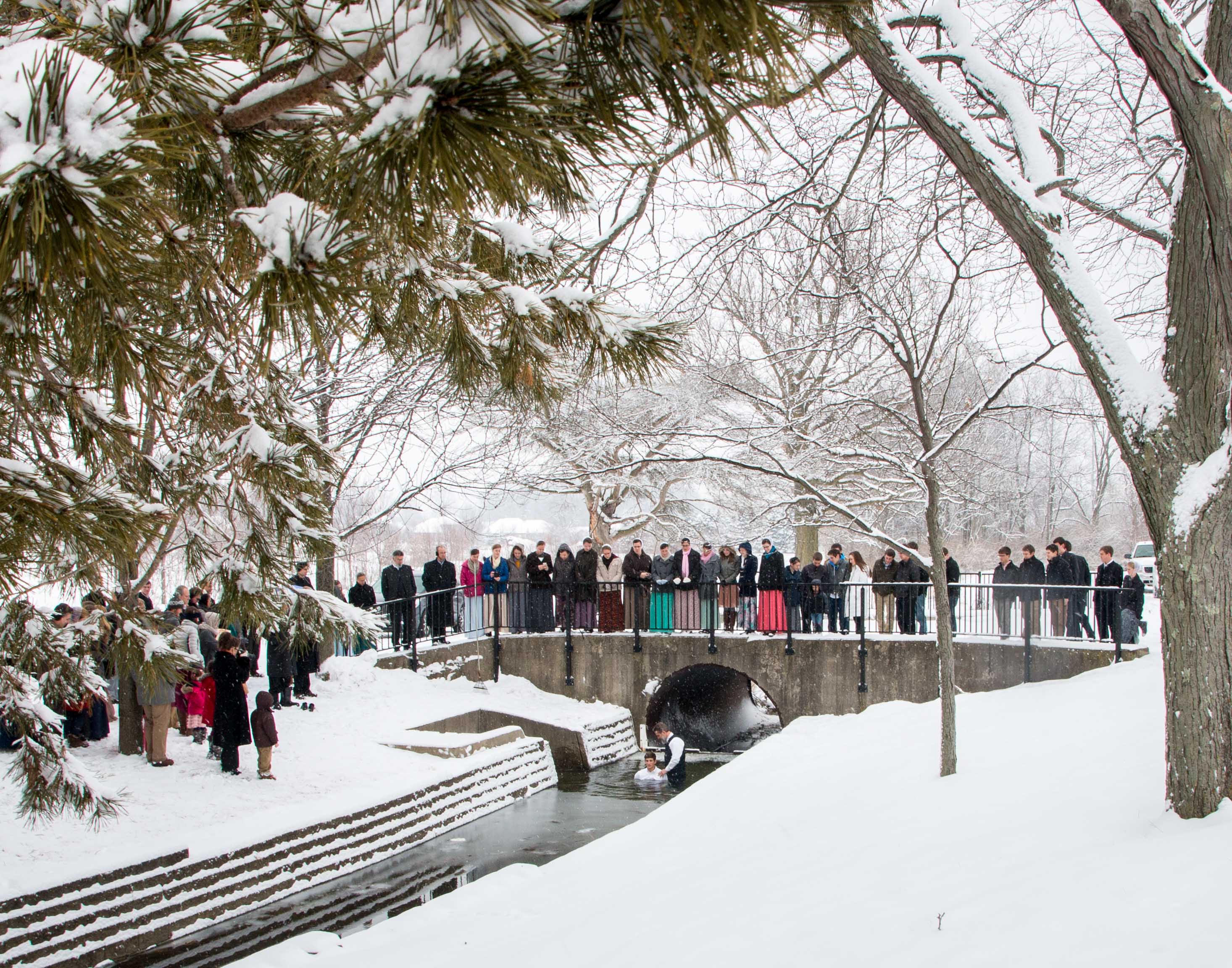
The Schwarzenau Brethren ordinance of baptism by trine immersion is celebrated by the Salem Congregation of the Old German Baptist Brethren Church, New Conference

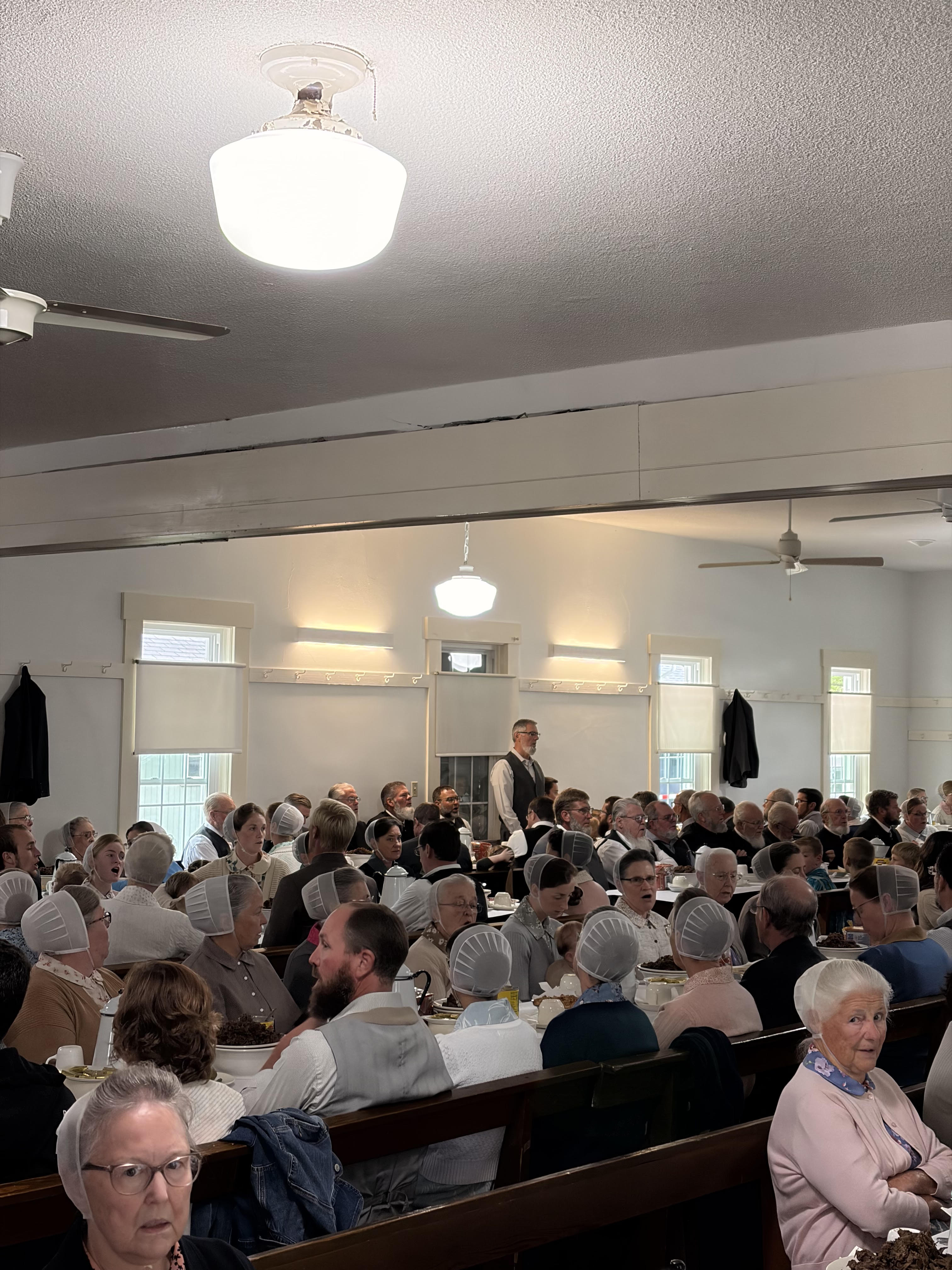
A Schwarzenau Brethren celebration of the lovefeast at the Bear Creek Congregation of the Old German Baptist Brethren Church, New Conference

[Brethren] take the Scripture as their only guide, in matters both of faith and practice...such Christians I have never seen as they are: so averse are they to all sin, and to many things that other Christians esteem lawful, that they not only refuse to swear, go to war, etc. but are so afraid of doing any thing contrary to the commands of Christ, that no temptation would prevail upon them ever to sue any person at law, for either name, character, estate, or any debt, be it ever so just. They are industrious, sober, temperate, kind, charitable people; envying not the great, nor despising the mean, they read much, they sing and pray much, they are constant attendants upon the worship of God, their dwelling houses are all houses of prayer. They walk in the commandments and ordinances of the Lord blameless both in public and private. They bring up their children in the nurture and admonition of the Lord. No noise of rudeness, shameless mirth, loud vain laughter is heard within their doors. The law of kindness is in their mouths; no sourness or moroseness, disgraces their religion; and whatsoever they believe their Savior commands, they practice without requiring or regarding what others do.

— Elhenan Winchester (Universalist preacher), 1803

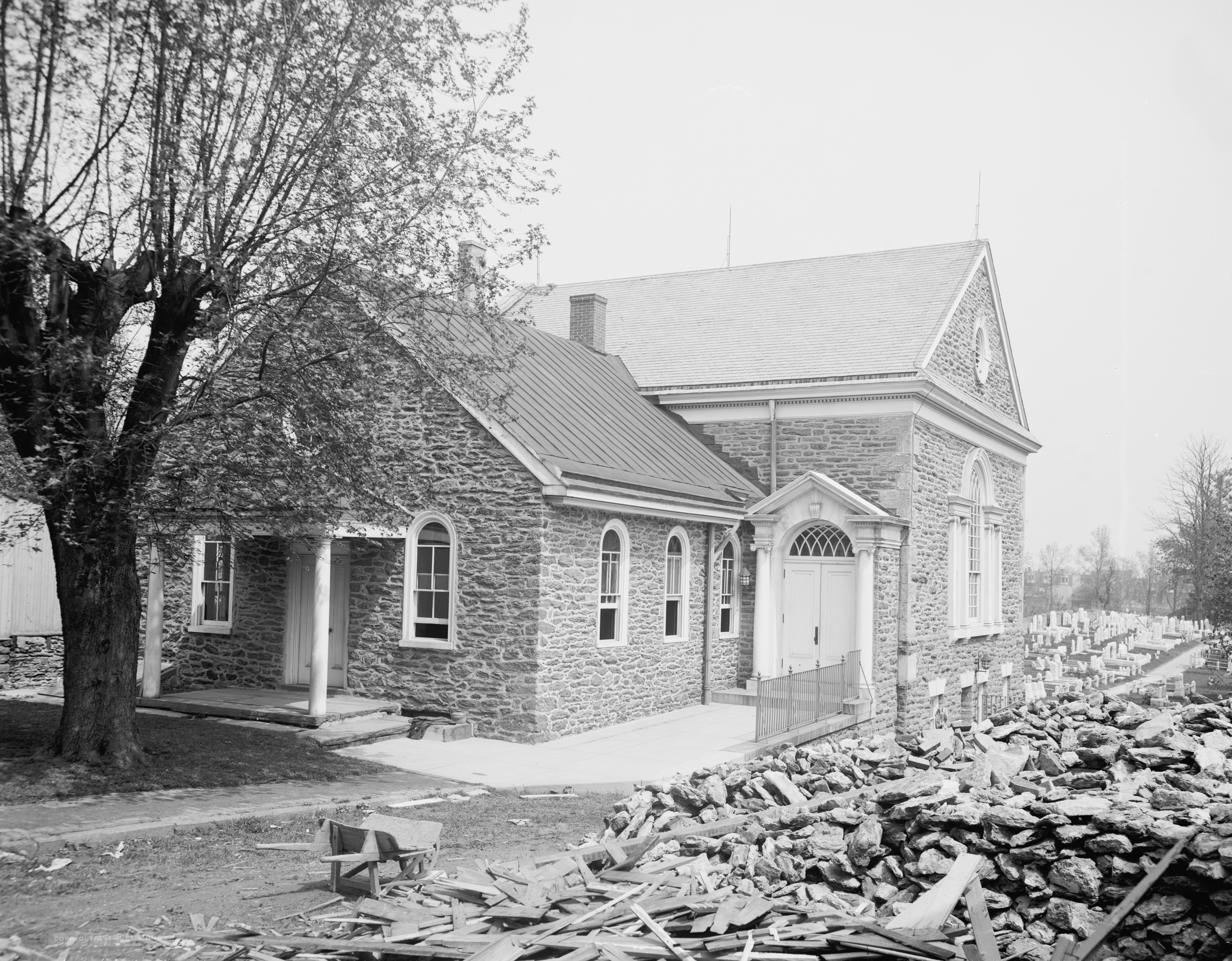
Brethren emphasize simplicity and humility in their life, including their architecture—as exemplified by this simple church built by Dunkers in Germantown, Philadelphia, pictured c. 1905.

The beliefs of the Schwarzenau Brethren include triple or trine immersion baptism, which provides that the candidate kneel in water and be immersed, face first, three times in the name of God the Father, the Son and the Holy Spirit; the New Testament as the infallible guide in spiritual matters; communion service celebrated in the evening, accompanied by the love feast; the ceremony of the washing of feet; the salutation of the holy kiss; prayer and anointing with oil over the sick; and nonresistance. See also The Brethren's Card.

Some of the early Schwarzenau Brethren believed in universal restoration, a variant of universal salvation that foretold that after the judgment and harsh punishment described in the New Testament, God's love would one day restore all souls to God. Brethren typically kept this teaching to themselves, and it was largely abandoned by the late nineteenth century. They were among the first to take Christian universalism to America when they emigrated there.

The church leaders are ministers, teachers, and deacons, though the name of these servant positions may differ slightly in the various branches. The official role of elder, while no longer recognized in many congregations, was formerly the most respected position in the church and performed the overseeing function that other churches may call Bishop. Ministers and deacons are elected by the members of the congregation in which they hold membership. Ministers preach the Word, baptize, assist deacons in anointing, solemnize marriages, and officiate at communion. Deacons serve the church by reading Scripture, leading in song and prayer, arranging for visitation to members or their families during illness or crisis, and often function in the capacity of stewards.

== Divisions ==
=== Early schisms ===
The first schism from the general body of German Baptist Brethren occurred in 1728. There were more divisions after the American Revolution, as different groups sought their own ways. The first separatists became the Seventh Day Dunkers, whose distinctive principle was that they believed that Saturday was true Sabbath. They were founded by German immigrant Johann Conrad Beissel (1690–1768).

In 1732, Beissel led establishment of a semi-monastic community with a convent and a monastery at Ephrata in what is now Lancaster County, Pennsylvania. While celibate, the community also welcomed believing families; they lived nearby and participated in joint worship. The monastic features and celibacy were gradually abandoned after the American Revolution.

In 1745, brothers Samuel, Israel and Gabriel Eckerlin protested against Beissel's leadership after Beissel condemned them for having planted an orchard, built a mill and started a textile-manufacturing workshop in an effort to make the community economically self-sufficient. The Eckerlins and Mack left Ephrata in September to establish Mahanaim (Dunkard's Bottom, Virginia) on the New River in western Virginia.

In 1814 the Society was incorporated as the Seventh Day Baptists or Seventh Day German Baptist Church. Several branches were established, some of which still exist. A group called the Church of God or "New Dunkers" withdrew in 1848. They disbanded in August 1962.

=== Old Order, Conservative, and mainline Schwarzenau Brethren ===
The Old Order Schwarzenau Brethren opposed 19th-century Brethren adoption of innovations in the United States such as revival meetings, Sunday Schools, and foreign missionary work. Stressing church discipline, Annual Meeting authority, and the preservation of the "ancient order" of church ordinances, worship, and simple unfashionable dress, they formed the Old German Baptist Brethren (OGBB) in 1881.

In 1882 the Progressives, who stressed outreach evangelism and objected to plain, distinctive dress and strong Annual Meeting authority, formed The Brethren Church, at the time of H. R. Holsinger. The largest body continued as German Baptist Brethren until 1908, when they adopted the title Church of the Brethren. Both the Brethren Church and the Church of the Brethren would be considered as mainline Schwarzaneu Brethren fellowships today.

The Dunkard Brethren Church, a conservative Schwarzenau Brethren denomination, maintains traditional theological beliefs and practices (such as plain dress and headcovering), while widely using modern conveniences. It was formed when conservative Schwarzenau Brethren withdrew from the Church of the Brethren in 1926 and established the Dunkard Brethren Church. As such, the Dunkard Brethren Church would fall in between Old Order Brethren (such as the Old Brethren German Baptist) and mainline Brethren denominations (such as The Brethren Church).

==== Divisions within Old Order fellowships ====
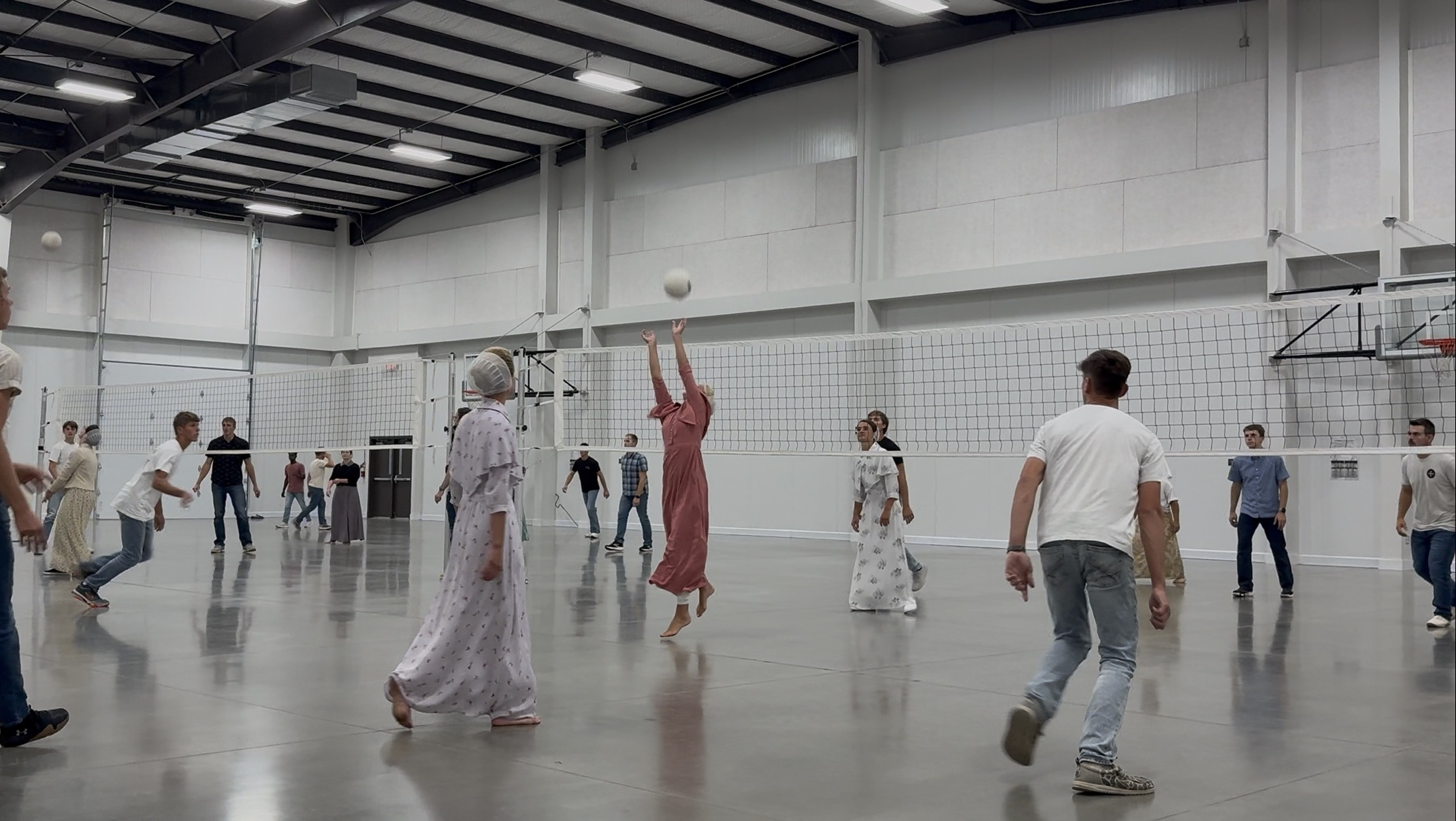
Schwarzenau Brethren of the Old German Baptist Brethren, New Conference playing volleyball at Brethren Heritage School in Modesto, California

In 1913 and 1915 the Old Brethren, centered in Salida, California, Dayton, Ohio and Camden, Indiana, withdrew from the Old German Baptist Brethren (OGBB). In 1921, the Old Order German Baptist Brethren, centered in Dayton, Ohio broke with the OGBB. Attempts in 1929–1930 to reunite the Old Brethren and OGBB were unsuccessful.

The Old Brethren subsequently divided into two groups, the Old Order of which took the name of Old Brethren German Baptists and was centered in Camden, Indiana and Missouri.

After 1996, a small conservative group calling themselves The German Baptist Brethren split from the OGBB. The most recent split came in 2009, with the establishment of the Old German Baptist Brethren, New Conference, parishioners who left the OGBB.

==== Divisions within progressives ====
In 1939 the "Progressive" Brethren Church experienced another schism. Those seeking an open position to the issue of eternal security maintained the name Brethren Church, with headquarters in Ashland, Ohio (the traditional Anabaptist doctrine has been conditional security). Those supporting a Calvinistic firm affirmation of eternal security became the National Fellowship of Brethren Churches, since renamed Fellowship of Grace Brethren Churches (FGBC). It is commonly called the Grace Brethren Church, and is headquartered in Winona Lake, Indiana.

In 1992, because of doctrinal disagreements within the FGBC (primarily related to the connection between water baptism and church membership), the Conservative Grace Brethren Churches, International (CGBCI) was formed. It has no centralized headquarters at this time.

==== Divisions within conservatives ====
The paradigmatic conservative Schwarzenau Brethren denomination remains the Dunkard Brethren Church, in that they have preserved the distinctives of plain dress and headcovering while widely using modern conveniences. The Dunkard Brethren Church withdrew from the Church of the Brethren in 1926 because of what some believed was a gradual drift away from apostolic standards.

In 2019, after years of disagreement over New Testament standards of personal morality, some conservative congregations who were leaving the Church of the Brethren chose to form a new denomination called the Covenant Brethren Church. This fellowship has member congregations in Africa and Guatemala as well as the US states of Indiana, North Carolina, Ohio, Pennsylvania, Tennessee, Virginia, Washington and West Virginia. Unlike the Dunkard Brethren Church that formed in 1926, the Covenant Brethren Church encourages but does not universally practice traditional Brethren distinctives such as the veiling or nonresistance (nonparticipation in the military).

==== Schwarzenau Brethren denominations ====
- Church of the Brethren
- Ephrata Cloister (1732–2009; known as German Seventh Day Baptist Church from 1814 then on)
- Church of God (New Dunkers) (1848–1962)
- Old German Baptist Brethren (1881–)
- Old Brethren (1913–)
- Old Brethren German Baptists (1939–)
- Old Order German Baptist Brethren (1921–)
- Old German Baptist Brethren, New Conference (2009–)
- The Brethren Church (1883–)
- Grace Brethren Church (1939–)
- Conservative Grace Brethren Churches, International (1992–)
- Dunkard Brethren Church (1926–): Though many churches retain the word "Dunkard" in their names, they may be congregations of more conservative "Old Order German Baptists", less conservative "Progressives", or the current "Church of the Brethren", also called in the 19th century "Fraternity of German Baptists," or simply "German Baptists", or within the community called "Dunkards".
- Covenant Brethren Church (2019–)

Other associated churches which associate with the term German Baptist include:

- Brethren Reformed Church

== Brethren World Assembly ==
As of 2003, six Brethren bodies meet together in the Brethren World Assembly: Church of the Brethren, Conservative Grace Brethren Churches, International, Dunkard Brethren Church, Fellowship of Grace Brethren Churches, Old German Baptist Brethren, and The Brethren Church. The first Assembly was held in Pennsylvania in 1992. They met at Elizabethtown College and celebrated the 250th anniversary of the first known Brethren Annual Meeting in 1742. That first meeting gathered near Conestoga in Lancaster County, Pennsylvania. The second Assembly met in 1998 at Bridgewater College in Bridgewater, Virginia. The third Assembly was held by Grace College in Winona Lake, Indiana, in 2003. The Assembly represents some 600,000 members around the world.

== The Brethren's Card ==
Brethren are noncreedal, but have summarized their beliefs in a variety of ways for the purpose of evangelical outreach. One such statement, developed and distributed during the late nineteenth century was the Brethren's Card. A later version was endorsed for general distribution by the 1923 Church of the Brethren Annual Conference. Variations on the Card were used by both the Old German Baptist Brethren and the Church of the Brethren. This is an early version that was widely circulated:

Be it known unto all men,

1. That there is a people who, as little children (Luke 18:17), accept the Word of the New Testament as a message from heaven (Hebrews 1:1–2), and teach it in full (2 Timothy 4:1–2, Matthew 28:20).
2. They baptize believers by trine immersion (Matthew 28:19), with a forward action (Romans 6:5), and for the remission of sins (Acts 2:38), and lay hands on those baptized, asking upon them the gift of God's Spirit (Acts 19:5–6).
3. They follow the command and example of washing one another's feet (John 13:4–17).
4. They take the Lord's Supper at night (John 13:30), at one and the same time, tarrying one for another (1 Corinthians 11:33–34).
5. They greet one another with a holy kiss (Acts 20:37, Romans 16:16).
6. They take the communion at night, after supper, as did the Lord (Mark 14:17, 23).
7. They teach all the doctrines of Christ, peace (Hebrews 12:14), love (1 Corinthians 13), unity (Ephesians 4), both faith and works following (James 2:17–20, Ephesians 2:8–10).
8. They labor for nonconformity to the world in its vain and wicked customs (Romans 12:2).
9. They advocate nonswearing (Matthew 5:34, 37), anti-secretism (2 Corinthians 6:14, 17), opposition to hatred, violence and war (Matthew 5:21–25 and 5:43–48, John 18:36), doing good unto all men (Matthew 5:44, 46).
10. They anoint and lay hands on the sick (James 5:14, 15).
11. They give the Bread of Life, the message of the common salvation offered unto all mankind without money or price (Matthew 10:8).
12. Dear reader, for the above we contend earnestly, and you, with all men, are entreated to hear, to examine and accept it as the word, which began to be spoken by the Lord, and the faith once delivered to the saints (Jude 3).

The 1923 version, influenced by both increasing formalism and by the Fundamentalist-modernist controversy of the 1910s differed in both tone and content:

1. This body of Christians known as Brethren originated early in the eighteenth century: the church being a natural outgrowth of the Pietistic movement following the Reformation.
2. Firmly accepts and teaches the fundamental evangelical doctrines of the inspiration of the Bible, the personality of the Holy Spirit, the virgin birth, the deity of Christ, the sin-pardoning value of his atonement, his resurrection from the tomb, ascension and personal and visible return; and the resurrection, both of the just and unjust (John 5:28–29; 1 Thessalonians 4:13–18).
3. Observes the following New Testament rites: Baptism of repentant believers by trine immersion for the remission of sins (Matthew 28:19, Acts 2:38); feet-washing (John 13:1–20, 1 Timothy 5:10); love feast (Luke 22:20, John 13:4, 1 Corinthians 11:17–34, Jude 12); communion (Matthew 26:26–30); the holy Christian greeting or salutation (Romans 16:16, Acts 20:37); proper modest appearance in worship (1 Corinthians 11:2–16); the anointing with oil for healing in the name of the Lord (James 5:13–18, Mark 6:13); laying on of hands (Acts 8:17, 19:6; 1 Timothy 4:14). These rites are representative of spiritual facts which obtain in the lives of true believers, and as such are essential factors in the development of the Christian life.
4. Emphasizes: daily devotion for the individual, and family worship for the home (Ephesians 6:18–20, Philippians 4:8–9); stewardship of time, talents and money (Matthew 25:14–30); taking care of the fatherless, widows, poor, sick and aged (Acts 6:1–7).
5. Opposes on Scriptural grounds: War and the taking of human life (the Antithesis of the Law; Romans 12:19–21, Isaiah 53:7–12); violence in personal and industrial controversy (Matthew 7:12, Romans 13:8–10); intemperance in all things (Titus 2:2, Galatians 5:19–26, Ephesians 5:18); going to law, especially against our Christian brethren (1 Corinthians 6:1–9); divorce and remarriage, (Mark 10:2–12, Luke 16:18, 1 Corinthians 7); every form of oath (Matthew 5:33–37, James 5:12); membership in secret societies (2 Corinthians 6:14–18); games of chance and sinful amusements (1 Thessalonians 5:22, 1 Peter 2:11, Romans 12:17); extravagant and immodest dress (1 Timothy 2:8–10, 1 Peter 3:1–6).
6. Labors earnestly, in harmony with the Great Commission, for the evangelization of the world; for the conversion of men to Jesus Christ; and for the realization of the life and love of Jesus Christ living in every true believer (Matthew 28:18–20, Mark 16:15–16, 2 Corinthians 3:18).
7. Maintains the New Testament as its only creed, in harmony with which the above brief doctrinal statement is made.

This version was officially circulated by the Church of the Brethren in its publications until the middle part of the twentieth century, and it continues to be issued through the efforts of Brethren Revival Fellowship.

The teachings of some other groups are similar to this, but can differ widely in emphasis and scope. For example, the Grace Brethren are varied on the requirement of trine immersion, do not practice the Christian salutation, do not oppose war, and do not formally adhere to plain dress or modesty. Only the Conservative Grace Brethren Churches have retained a published use of the motto, "The Bible, the whole Bible, and nothing but the Bible".

In the progressive and liberal Church of the Brethren, significant emphasis is placed on social action issues. In the Brethren (Ashland) and Grace Brethren groups, significant emphasis is placed on exegesis of the Bible. Several of the groups maintain a larger "Doctrinal Statement" or treatise, but only for the purpose of clarifying their Biblical position.

Most Brethren groups maintain that the Bible is the sole authority and will revise their statement of faith if they perceive any difference between it and sound Biblical doctrine. Some of the Old Order groups incorporate church authority as a mechanism for unifying the interpretation and application of Biblical teachings.

== Unrelated groups ==
There are several religious groups named Brethren that are not related to the Schwarzenau Brethren movement. The Moravian Brethren, Hutterian Brethren and Swiss Brethren are not related to the Schwarzenau Brethren, except as inspirational examples. The Plymouth Brethren arose in England and Ireland early in the 19th century. The United Brethren originated in 18th-century Pennsylvania with William Otterbein and Martin Boehm. The River Brethren movement adopted the view of trine immersion and most other Anabaptist beliefs and practices from the Schwarzenau Brethren. Today, the Old Order River Brethren are very similar to the Old Brethren—both being part of the Anabaptist tradition.

The Apostolic United Brethren is a group within the Latter Day Saint movement and is not related to the Schwarzenau Brethren.

Schwarzenau Brethren (German Baptists), an Anabaptist tradition, are not to be confused with non-Anabaptist groups such as Primitive, Separate, Southern, Particular, who are categorized as Baptists. Although both Anabaptists and Baptists agree on rudimentary doctrines such as believer's baptism and separation of church and state, they would have conflicting views in other areas, such as non-resistance, separation from worldly entertainment, literal interpretation of the Sermon on the Mount, etc. In addition, Schwarzenau Brethren are not to be confused with a recent, small, renewal movement of "Plain," or "Covered" Baptists, who share many comparable beliefs and practices with the historic German Baptists, but are of different origins.
