= Old Brethren Church =

The Old Brethren Church is a Schwarzenau Brethren denomination in the Anabaptist tradition of Christianity. They are a believer's church made up of those who voluntarily choose to follow Jesus as His disciples, and are baptized at this time, during their teen or adult years.

The Old Brethren Church dates back to Germany in 1708, when the Schwarzenau Brethren were formed in Berleburg under the leadership of Alexander Mack. Soon they moved to Pennsylvania to escape religious persecution in Europe. As the American frontier moved west, the Schwarzenau Brethren followed to Ohio, Indiana and beyond. A schism within the Schwarzenau Brethren led to the Old Brethren splitting from the Old German Baptist Brethren in Carroll County, Indiana (Deer Creek), in 1913, and in Stanislaus County, California, in 1915.

== History ==
The issue which is often given as cause for division in the early 1900s was the changes brought by quick acceptance of telephones and automobiles among the Old German Baptist Brethren.

Historically the Schwarzenau Brethren groups have believed in and practiced the independent authority of each local congregation. After immigration to North America, the Brethren spread west with the frontier and settled in mostly rural groups. Annual Meetings started out gradually as a time for worship, exhortation, problem solving and unity among the first several generations of dispersed, frontier living, German-speaking Brethren families. Generally, the more conservative Old Brethren originally wanted more adherence to Annual Meeting decisions. After discussion through the years ultimately the Old Brethren chose to uphold the older form of Annual Meeting, which was simpler, more worship and Scripture based than the legislative business model which had recently developed among the Old German Baptist Brethren. Attempts in 1929–30 to reunite the Old Brethren and Old German Baptist Brethren were not successful.

After 1930, the Old Brethren placed less stress on Annual Meeting authority than did their parent body, believing it to be a simple gathering more for edification, fellowship and teaching, rather than for legislation. Individual conviction by the Holy Spirit and moral persuasion to follow the Bible are now the basis for adherence to the church's order, rather than authoritative legislative decisions of Annual Meeting.

In 1939, those Old Brethren who wished to stress following legislative decisions of Annual Meeting and also to maintain the rejection of automobiles, telephones, electricity and tractors formed a more conservative traditional group, called the Old Brethren German Baptists.

== Religious practice ==
Old Brethren do not use the German language in worship any longer, neither a German dialect in everyday life nor High German for Bible and church readings, because they had already begun giving up the everyday use of the German language when the first split of conservatives from the main body of German Baptist Brethren occurred in the 1880s. They have given up horse and buggy transportation and now accept the use of automobiles, while they have retained plain dress (including the headcovering for women) and a simple lifestyle separated from worldly fads and entertainment.

The Old Brethren prefer to allow time and space for the Holy Spirit to guide a person's life. Brotherly counsel according to Matthew 18 and other Scripture is also followed. Teachings of the New Testament are interpreted and applied literally, with special focus given to the Sermon on the Mount (Matthew 5-7) as guidelines for those who are citizens of the Kingdom of God.

Old Brethren have fewer written rules than the Old German Baptist Brethren, preferring to let the Holy Spirit convict hearts and lead people to live holy lives, according to the Scriptures.

Old Brethren are more plain in dress and more conservative in lifestyle than some members of their parent group the Old German Baptist Brethren; but are similar to them in aspects such as nonresistance, using the Trine Immersion mode of baptism and the three-part communion service including feetwashing and a love feast.

== Members and congregations ==
In 1980 the Old Brethren numbered about 230 adult members. Old Brethren membership in 2000 was 350 in five congregations with a total population of 651. As of 2020 Old Brethren reside mainly near Salida, CA, Modesto, CA, Tuolumne, CA, Wakarusa, IN and Goshen, IN, between Bradford, OH, Dayton, OH, Greenville, OH, New Lebanon, OH, and Palestine OH; and near Harrison, AR and Marble Falls, AR with a total of 8 meeting houses in use. There are Old Brethren private church schools at Nappanee IN, Palestine, OH, and Tuolumne, CA. Those children who do not attend Christian schools are home schooled.

== Publishing ==
A weekly periodical, The Pilgrim, was started in 1870 by brothers Henry Boyer Brumbaugh and J. B. Brumbaugh in James Creek, Pennsylvania. This was later changed to monthly publication and came to be affiliated with the Old Brethren Church.

== See also ==
- Old Order River Brethren
- Plain people
