= Dunkard Brethren Church =

Conservative Anabaptist denomination

- Classification: Anabaptist
- Orientation: Conservative Anabaptist
- Theology: Schwarzenau Brethren
- Associations: Brethren World Assembly
- Origin: 1926
- Separations: Conservative German Baptist Brethren Church
- Congregations: 26
- Members: 1,035
- Official website: dunkardbrethrenchurch.com

The Dunkard Brethren Church is a Conservative Anabaptist denomination of the Schwarzenau Brethren tradition, which organized in 1926 when its members withdrew from the Church of the Brethren in the United States.

The Dunkard Brethren Church observes the ordinances of baptism, feetwashing, communion, the holy kiss, headcovering, and anointing of the sick.

In 2001, the Dunkard Brethren Church had approximately 1035 members in 26 congregations. As with other Conservative Anabaptist fellowships, the Dunkard Brethren Church holds revival services and Sunday School, in addition to being engaged in evangelism and missionary work.

== Name ==
The name Dunkard or Dunker is derived from the Pennsylvania German word dunke, which comes from the German word tunken, meaning 'to dunk' or 'to dip'. This refers to their preference for the trine immersion method of baptism, in the forward position, observed by all of the various branches of Schwarzenau Brethren.

== History ==
The Dunkard Brethren are a branch of the Schwarzenau Brethren or Dunkards, an Anabaptist tradition that emerged during the Radical Pietist revival. This movement began in 1708, when Alexander Mack and seven other believers conducted baptism of new members by immersion in the Eder river in Germany.

The Church of the Brethren represented the largest body of churches that descended from this original pietist and Anabaptist movement. For the history until 1926 see Church of the Brethren: Early history and Church of the Brethren: The Great Schism.

Early in the 20th century, some members of Church of the Brethren in the United States, the largest of the branch of the Schwarzenau Brethren, began to believe that there was a drift away from the old apostolic standards, such as the wearing of plain dress and the headcovering. Benjamin Elias Kesler (1861–1952), an Elder of the Church of the Brethren in Missouri, addressed these concerns in a monthly paper. It was 20 pages and called The Bible Monitor, which he first published in October 1922. In 1923, Kesler was refused a seat at the Annual Conference. His conservative sympathizers held a separate meeting in each of the next three years.

During the Annual Conference in 1926, concerns nearly identical to those of Kesler and his sympathizers were addressed by other members, but not resolved in a way that satisfied Kesler and his followers. Subsequently the Kesler group withdrew from the Church of the Brethren and in 1926 formed the Dunkard Brethren Church.

=== Immigration to the U.S. ===
In 1719, led by Peter Becker, twenty families left Germany and immigrated to the US. They settled in Germantown, Pennsylvania. Alexander Mack led 200 other Brethren to the Netherlands in 1720; after living there for nine years, they found that religious conditions had deteriorated. They immigrated to the US, joining the original Dunkard group in Pennsylvania.

== Belief and practice ==
Dunkard Brethren practice believer's baptism, that is, reserving baptism for a person old enough to commit to belief. A believer is immersed three times to represent the Trinity: once in the name of the Father, once in the name of the Son, and once in the name of the Holy Spirit. Most of the women of the Dunkard Brethren dress in a plain manner, which has been associated with other Conservative Anabaptists, such as the Conservative Mennonites (including the Beachy Mennonites), as well as Old Order Anabaptist groups, such as the Old Order Brethren and Old Order Mennonites. Women are also expected to wear a plain white headcovering, usually in the form of a kapp. Men keep their hair cut short.

The Dunkard Brethren practice the holy kiss and the love feast with feetwashing. Divorce is not allowed for members of the church. They are discouraged from buying life insurance. Dunkard Brethren do not swear oaths to the state or organizations, and do not file lawsuits without permission of the church. The use of alcohol and tobacco is forbidden, as is watching television, or participating in gaming or gambling. Participation in politics, or labor unions, and membership in secret fraternal societies such as the Freemasons, are seen as contrary to the Gospel and a pure heart.

== Members and congregations ==
In 1980 there were 1,035 members in 26 congregations. The Dunkard Brethren Church has 25 congregations in the United States, with approximately 900 members. The majority of the churches are located in Pennsylvania, Maryland, Indiana, Iowa, Kansas, California, and Ohio. They support a mission among the Navajo Indians in New Mexico, and a mission in Africa.

== Publication ==
The church's publication, a paper that has been published monthly since October 1922, is called The Bible Monitor.

== See also ==
- Conservative Mennonites
- Beachy Amish
- Henry Studebaker, founder of the automobile company
