= Manahan =

Manahan may refer to:

== People ==
- Aeon Manahan, British songwriter, music producer and performer
- Anastasia Manahan or Anna Anderson (1896–1984), impostor who claimed to be Grand Duchess Anastasia of Russia
- Anna Manahan (1924–2009), Irish stage, film and television actress
- Anthony Manahan (1794–1849), businessman and political figure in Upper Canada
- Cliff Manahan (1888–1970), Canadian curler from Edmonton, Alberta
- Denise Manahan-Vaughan, dean of studies and director of the International Graduate School of Neuroscience at the Ruhr University Bochum
- Donal T. Manahan (born 1953), Irish-born American marine scientist and comparative physiologist
- Elin Manahan Thomas, British soprano, best known as a performer of Baroque music
- James Manahan (1866–1932), U.S. Representative from Minnesota
- Janelle Manahan or Janelle Quintana (born 1989), actress in the Philippines
- Joey Manahan (born 1971), Filipino American politician
- Kelly J. Manahan, medical researcher
- Larry Manahan, former member of the Ohio House of Representatives, serving from 1977 to 1992
- Manuel Manahan (1916–1994), Filipino statesman, journalist, businessman, and rural development advocate
- Michael Manahan (died 2000), Irish civil servant within the Department of Industry and Commerce
- Robert L. Manahan (1956–2000), American actor
- Ronald E. Manahan, president of Grace College and Theological Seminary
- Sheila Manahan (1924–1988), Irish actress

== Other uses ==
- Manahan (train), a passenger train in Indonesia
- Manahan Peak, in northeast Ross Island, Antarctica
- Manahan Stadium, multi-purpose stadium in Surakarta, Indonesia

== See also ==
- Hanahan (disambiguation)
- Manahen
- Manmohan
- Monahan
