= William J. Katip =

American academic administrator

William J. Katip was president of Grace College & Seminary in Winona Lake, Indiana, USA, from May 2013 to December 2021, after which he was succeeded by interim president Dr. John Teevan.

Katip is a graduate of Grace College (B.A., Bible and Psychology) and earned an M.S. in Clinical Psychology from Purdue University. He completed a Ph.D. in Higher Education Administration from Michigan State University.

Initially employed by Grace College from 1974 to 1983, Katip served a variety of functions after which he held administrative positions at Cornerstone University (formerly Grand Rapids Baptist College), Corban University (formerly Western Baptist College), Geneva College and Robert Morris University. In 2005, he was elected to the board of trustees for Grace College and Seminary and then, in 2007, then president Ronald E. Manahan selected him to serve as Provost.

As Provost, Katip was instrumental in helping to carry out several new initiatives including a three-year option for all undergraduate programs, which included shifting the school's academic calendar, and the addition of several commuter locations as part of Grace College's Henry and Frances Weber School. These new initiatives were implemented by Manahan and Katip, at least in part, as an aggressive response to solving the school's financial challenges during the Great Recession. While president, Katip led efforts to launch a Grace engineering degree program, initially through a partnership with Trine University, and recently through its own Department of Engineering.

Katip has also been involved in several efforts for community development in the Winona Lake and Warsaw, Indiana area and has served on the board of directors for both the Kosciusko Economic Development Corporation (KEDCO) and OrthoWorx.

Academic offices
Preceded by Ronald E. Manahan	President of Grace Theological Seminary; 2013–2021	Succeeded by John Teevan, interim president
