= Ronald E. Manahan =

Ronald E. Manahan is an author, lecturer, and educator. From 1993 to 2013, he was the president of Grace College and Theological Seminary in Winona Lake, Indiana, United States.

Manahan was the fifth president of Grace College and Seminary and served Grace for more than 25 years. From 1977 to 1986, he held the position of professor of biblical studies. From 1987 to 1990, he served as vice president of college academic affairs, from 1990 to 1993, as provost, and from 1993 to January 1994, as acting president. He was appointed president by the board of trustees in January, 1994 and retired May 2013. He currently holds the position of Senior Advisor to the current president, William J. Katip.

He holds a Diploma from Grand Rapids School of Bible and Music, a B.A. from Shelton College, and an M.Div., Th.M., and Th.D. from Grace Theological Seminary. He has completed post-doctoral research at Union Theological Seminary.

Manahan served as pastor of Orland Congregational Church in Orland, Indiana, and has filled several interim pastorates including two in Grace Brethren Churches. He is a member of the Community of Hope Grace Brethren Church, Columbia City, Indiana.

He has served on the board of directors of the Kosciusko County Chapter of the American Red Cross, Grand Rapids School of Bible and Music, the Committee to Commemorate Dr. Martin Luther King, Jr., Inc., and Lakeland Christian Academy.

He is married to Barbara and is the father of two children: Kelly and Nathan.

Academic offices
Preceded by John J. Davis	President of Grace Theological Seminary; 1994–2013	Succeeded by William J. Katip
