= Louis Bauman =

American minister

Louis S. Bauman
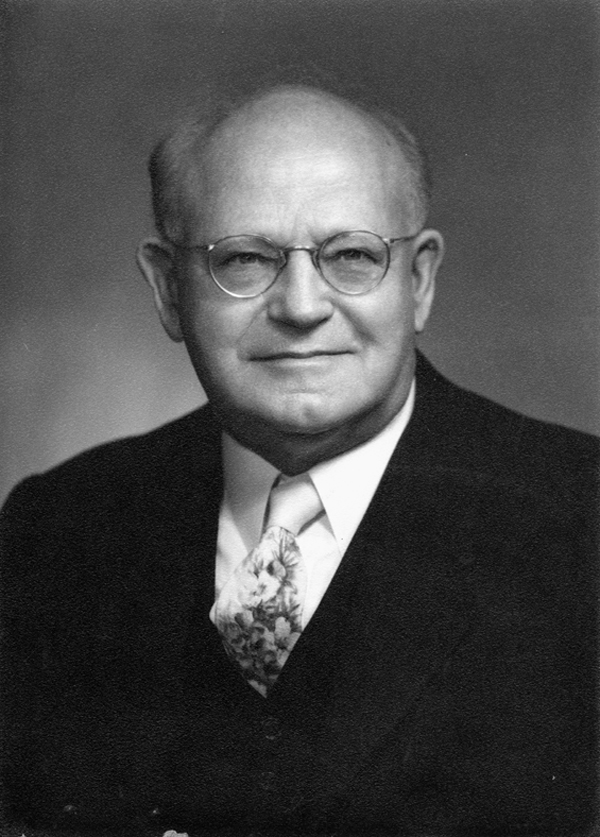
- Minister, evangelist; Grace Brethren pioneer
- Born: November 13, 1875; Nora Springs, Iowa
- Died: November 8, 1950 (aged 74); Washington, D.C.

Louis Sylvester Bauman (November 13, 1875 – November 8, 1950) was a Brethren minister, writer, and Bible conference speaker, holding influential leadership in the Brethren Church and the "Grace Brethren" movement which evenly divided the denomination in 1939. He served in several pastorates, in particular the First Brethren Church of Long Beach, California where he was pastor for thirty-four years (1913–1947).

Bauman held to traditional Brethren views regarding baptism, communion, and nonresistance, but also held to evangelical convictions regarding missions and dispensationalism, with the latter views becoming foundational beliefs of Grace Brethren.

== Biography ==
=== Early life ===
Bauman was born in Nora Springs, Iowa to William J.H. Bauman and Amelia (née Leckington) Bauman. In 1878 his family moved to the Morrill, Kansas. His father was a German Baptist Brethren (as all Schwarzenau Brethren were known as before 1881/82) elder, and Bauman joined the Pony Creek Brethren congregation through a revival held by his father in February 1889. Bauman came from humble beginnings, with both parents at times employed to meet the needs of their four children (Bauman had three sisters). He received his high school education in Lawrence, Kansas and obtained no education higher except for an honorary degree from Ashland College.

He married a teacher named Mary M. Wageman on April 28, 1898; she spoke in the pulpit on occasion and also wrote for The Brethren Evangelist. They had three children: Glenn, Iva Muriel, and Paul. Glenn died at age six (ca. 1907), which spurred Bauman's reading of Biblical prophecies and his thought development toward dispensationalism. Mary died on September 12, 1909, and he remarried to Reta Virginia Stover on April 8, 1912. Bauman and Stover first met at an evangelistic campaign in Sunnyside, Washington in 1911, where Brethren leader and Grace Seminary co-founder Alva J. McClain was converted to Christianity.

=== Early ministry ===
Bauman gave his first sermon at age seventeen on July 2, 1893, at the Pony Creek (Kansas) Brethren Church. He was ordained in the Brethren Church on August 4, 1894, and was pastor of the Auburn and Cornell, Illinois congregations from 1895 to 1897 followed by pastorates at Roann and Mexico, Indiana congregations from 1897 to 1900.

=== Philadelphia ===
In 1900 Bauman began a pastorate at the First Brethren Church of Philadelphia, a place where his interest in foreign missions and eschatology would bloom. There he met brothers Jacob C. and H.C. Cassel who both had passions for mission work. He became a charter member of the Foreign Missionary Society of the Brethren Church in 1900, in 1904 became a member of its board of trustees, and in 1906 became the board's secretary. Bauman served in the last position until 1945. When he was a Philadelphia streetcar conductor, James Gribble (missionary) was led to the Lord and baptized by Dr. Bauman. James, along with his wife Dr. Florence Gribble became pioneer missionaries to the African French colony of Ubangi-Shari (which in 1960 became the Central African Republic).

Bauman's interest in eschatology was greatly impacted by a well known Brethren premillennialist and through the grieving process of losing his oldest son. Isaac D. Bowman was Bauman's predecessor at the Philadelphia church, published writer, and open premillennialist. Bowman and Bauman remained in close contact throughout their lifetimes, although Bowman's theological views were more traditionally Brethren, and remained with the Ashland Brethren group in the 1939 division. The death of Bauman's son Glenn brought a devoted reading to prophetic texts of the Bible. In his eulogy of Bauman, longtime Long Beach Brethren Church assistant pastor Alan S. Pearce summarizes the experience.

When [Bauman's] firstborn son, Glenn, was taken to be with the Lord, at the age of 6, doubts arose in the mind of Louis Bauman. Why should his boy be taken, while others who got their food from garbage cans in the alleys remain? Why should his boy be taken from him? Determined to get an answer, he was driven, as never before, to the unchangeable "word of God, which liveth and abideth forever." Here he found not only consolation and assurance, but became fascinated with the book of Daniel, he read and reread the prophecies contained in this portion of the Scriptures, and comparing them with other Scriptures, he was convinced that only a God who knew the end from the beginning could be the author of the Bible.

While in Philadelphia Bauman wrote the first edition of his magnum opus The Faith Once for All Delivered unto the Saints, at slightly over 100 pages details his traditional Brethren beliefs along with his developed interest. See: Theology.

=== Long Beach ===
For the majority of his career, 1913 to 1948, Bauman was pastor of "Fifth and Cherry" First Brethren Church of Long Beach, California. On October 13, 1912, Bauman, along with B.P. Stout, held an evangelistic tent meeting on the southeast corner of Tenth Street and Walnut Avenue, where seventy-one individuals converted to Christianity and forty-nine expressed interest to become members of a Brethren Church in Long Beach. He fulfilled several evangelistic campaign commitments that winter and returned as pastor on March 2, 1913, as a church building was being built, which was dedicated on July 20 of that year. This congregation quickly became a hub for missionary activity, the development of young Brethren leadership, and in time what became the "Grace Brethren" movement.

Bauman was instrumental in developing young Brethren Church leaders within his theological perspective. Having been in connection with R. A. Torry of the Bible Institute of Los Angeles (BIOLA) Bauman encouraged many young men to attend dispensationalist BIOLA, teach Sunday School classes at Bauman's Long Beach church, then go throughout Brethren congregations and organizations. In this time Bauman became a prolific writer (see Selected Works). He wrote over ten books, contributed regularly to magazines in both the fundamentalist and Brethren perspectives, and spoke at numerous churches and conferences. The majority of Bauman's writings were on end times prophecy, looking at current events of his time and how they may relate to the Bible through the classic dispensationalist perspective. His method have since been repeated by authors Hal Lindsey of The Late Great Planet Earth fame and Tim LaHaye, co-author of the Left Behind series. He wrote countless letters, mostly to missionaries encouraging their work and to fellow pastors concerning both personal regards and issues within the Brethren Church.

As the Long Beach church grew in size and influence, it brought the fundamentalism movement into the Brethren Church, creating tension and disagreement among Bauman's group and those who held to traditional Brethren theology and approach. The Brethren Church had rejected classical liberal theology in 1921, in large part by Bauman's influence, with "The Message of the Brethren Ministry," written by J. Allen Miller and Alva J. McClain. However the aggressive approach of fundamentalism conflicted with the drawn out approach of traditional Brethrenism. The fundamentalist desired strongly worded statements of faith, the traditional Brethren stressed non-creedalism. The fundamentalist's classic dispensationalist belief largely disregarded the Sermon on the Mount as a law for an earlier age, while the traditional Brethren statement "the New Testament is our Rule of Faith and Practice" placed a high emphasis on this passage in Matthew 5–7. The fundamentalist were largely Calvinist, the traditional Brethren largely Arminian.

This tension finally erupted in 1936–37 with a growing controversy at Ashland College. Although the school was in the control of the Brethren Church, it was transitioning from a Christian denominational school to a secular school with more regional and less denominational focus. Because of a push to enlarge non-Brethren representation on the board of trustees and establish a "double standard" of conduct for regular college students and pre-seminary college students, Bauman and Charles Ashman, Sr. (1886–1967) resigned from the Ashland College board of trustees on June 1, 1937. The next day, professors Alva J. McClain and Herman Hoyt were fired from Ashland Seminary because of increasing tension between the college group and the seminary group. At a prayer meeting in the home of J.C. Beal that evening Grace Theological Seminary was born, where after prayer Bauman announced "I want to give the first gift to the new school."

In the next two years two groups emerged in the Brethren Church: those sympathetic with Ashland College and those sympathetic with Grace Seminary. Traditional Brethren, in part because of their drawn out approach and in part because of their distaste of fundamentalist theology, sided with Ashland College, while the fundamentalist led by Bauman and McClain, sided with Grace. In 1939, the Grace Seminary group formed the National Fellowship of Brethren Churches.

=== Later ministry ===
After serving at Long Beach, Bauman went on to be pastor at the First Brethren Church of Washington, D.C. from the age of 73 until his death in 1950. Up until his death he remained a prolific writer and dominant voice in the developing Grace Brethren movement. He was buried on what would have been his 75th birthday in the Germantown Cemetery, the Brethren "Mother Congregation" church cemetery located in Germantown, Pennsylvania Many prominent Brethren, including founder Alexander Mack, are buried at this cemetery.

== Theology ==
Bauman held strongly to beliefs (and concerns) of other early twentieth century fundamentalist, being deeply against classic liberalism and consumed with end times prophecy. He believed that Benito Mussolini was the anti-Christ, and was a strong Zionist. However, unlike other fundamentalist of his time, he held to many, although arguably not all, of the pietistic and Anabaptist influenced distinctives of his Brethren tradition. This unique mixture (or what later would become tension among Grace Brethren themselves) is laid out in The Faith Once for All Delivered unto the Saints. In this work Bauman lays out his convictions in four sections, the first (Basic Doctrine) and last (Prophetic Doctrine) being very fundamentalist in nature and the middle two (The Great Commission and Practical Doctrine) distinctively Brethren.

Several of Bauman's fundamentalist perspectives did create strong disagreement among many of his Brethren Church peers and along with the events at Ashland College brought about the denominational split of the late nineteen thirties. The Sermon on the Mount of Matthew 5–7, a foundational passage for Brethren and Anabaptist groups in general, was viewed by Bauman in a classical dispensationalism framework as a passage intended for the Jews and not the New Testament gospel intended for the Church in the "Age of Grace." Bauman said regarding the Sermon on the Mount that "there's no gospel in it because there's no blood in it." At the height of conflict between "Ashland" and "Grace" Brethren groups, Bauman wrote:

We hold in common with our Brethren of The Grace Seminary Group that The Sermon on the Mount, coming from the lips of the incarnate God, is the highest, holiest, purest, most perfect law that ever has fallen, or ever will fall, upon ears of men. It is the law of the Kingdom of Heaven...The Gospel of salvation calls for blood atonement; for a belief in the deity of Jesus Christ, the Son of God; and, for faith in the resurrection of Christ from the dead - not one word of which doctrines are found in the Sermon on The Mount.

== Selected works ==
=== Published books and pamphlets ===
- The Faith Once for All Delivered unto the Saints. (1906)
- The Modern Tongues Movement: Examined and Judged in the Light of the Scripture and in the Light of its Fruits. (1930)
- God and Gog: or The Coming Meet Between Judah's Lion and Russia's Bear. (1934)
- Shirts and Sheets; or Anti-Semitism: A Present Day Sign of the First Magnitude! (1934)
- "The Time of Jacob's Trouble" An Answer to the Question of a Little Jewish Girl: "Tell Me, Father, What Makes Folks Hate Us So?" (1935)
- The Handbook of Missionary Facts. (1936)
- Light from Bible prophecy as Related to the Present Crisis. (1936)
- Three Unclean Spirits like Frogs: Socialism, Communism, Fascism. (1936)
- "Prepare War!" or Arming for Armageddon. (1937)
- Russian Events in the Light of Bible Prophecy. (1942)
- Was Jesus Born on Christmas Day? Should Christians celebrate Christmas? (1947)
- The Approaching End of This Age. Collection of articles originally published in The King's Business (1952)
- Biblical Prophecy in an Apocalyptic Age. (1988)

=== Magazines which Bauman contributed to frequently ===
- The Brethren Evangelist Bauman began contributing to the Brethren Church magazine in his late teens, and wrote frequently up until the Ashland/Grace split in 1939.
- The Brethren Missionary Herald Bauman was a contributor to the Grace Brethren movement newsletter from its start until his death in 1950.
- The King's Business This monthly publication was produced by the Bible Institute of Los Angeles (BIOLA). Bauman wrote nearly each month, pointing to current events and their alignment with his interpretation of Biblical prophecy.
- The Sunday School Times

== See also ==
- Dispensationalism
- Dispensationalist Theology
- Fellowship of Grace Brethren Churches
- Fundamentalist Christianity
- Mission (Christian)
- Premillennialism
- Schwarzenau Brethren
