= Homer Kent =

American theologian (1926–2020)

Homer Austin Kent Jr. (August 13, 1926 – September 30, 2020) taught from 1949 to 1999 at Grace Theological Seminary and Grace College in Winona Lake, Indiana. While there he taught New Testament and Greek and was Dean of the Seminary from 1962 to 1976 when he became President of Grace College and Seminary until 1986. He has also taught around the world in Israel, France, Central African Republic, Hungary and around the U.S. Not only is he an educator, but he is also authored many books and Bible commentaries.

== Personal life ==
Homer was born in Washington, D.C., on August 13, 1926, and lived there until he was 14 years of age. At the age of 14, he moved to Winona Lake when his father, Homer A. Kent Sr., accepted a job at Grace Theological Seminary. He received his bachelor's degree from Bob Jones University and received post-graduate degrees (M.Div, Th.M, Th.D) at Grace Theological Seminary. He married Beverly Page in 1953 in her hometown of Long Beach, CA. They had three children, Rebecca Anne (1955) who married Gary Woolman, Katherine Ruth (1959) who married Mark McCarthy, and Daniel Arthur (1964) who married Lisa Jones. They also have six grandchildren and seven great-grandchildren. In 1999, a residence hall, named Kent Hall, was built at Grace College and named in honor of Dr. and Mrs. Kent. He died on September 30, 2020, in Winona Lake, Indiana.

== Books Authored by Kent ==
- Ephesians: The Glory of the Church (Everyman's Bible Commentary)
- Light In the Darkness: Studies In the Gospel of John
- Jerusalem to Rome: Studies in the Book of Acts (New Testament Studies Series)
- Studies In Mark: The Beginning of the Gospel of Jesus Christ
- The Epistle to the Hebrews (Kent Collection)
- Treasures of Wisdom: Studies in Colossians and Philemon
- A Heart Opened Wide: Studies in 2 Corinthians (Kent Collection)
- Treasures of Wisdom: Studies in Colossians & Philemon (Kent Collection)
- Pastoral Epistles (Kent Collection)
- The Freedom of God's Sons: Studies in Galatians
- Faith That Works: Studies and the Epistle of James
- The Pastoral epistles: Studies in I and II Timothy and Titus
- The Pastor and His Work
- Heart Opened Wide: Studies in II Corinthians
- The Expositor's Bible Commentary: Ephesians through Philemon
- Studies in Acts: A History of the Early Church
- Faith That Works
- The Glory of the Church: Studies in Ephesians
- Studies in the Gospel of Mark
- The Epistle to the Hebrews
- The Expositor's (Expositors) Bible Commentary Volume 11 - Ephesians, Philippians, Colossians, Thessalonians, Timothy, Titus, and Philemon

Academic offices
| Preceded by Herman A. Hoyt | President of Grace Theological Seminary; 1976–1986 | Succeeded by John J. Davis |
