= John J. Davis (theologian) =

American theologian, archaeologist, and Christian educator

John James Davis (born 1936) is an American theologian, archaeologist, and Christian educator. He was the President and Professor Emeritus at Grace Theological Seminary in Winona Lake, Indiana.

== Early life and education ==
Davis was born in 1936 to Cathryn Ann and John James Davis. He was raised in southern New Jersey and attended Audubon High School. He studied at the Philadelphia Bible Institute in 1955, and in 1959 obtained a B.A. from Trinity College of Florida. Davis was ordained in the Grace Brethren Church in 1962. He received a B.D. in 1962, Th.M. in 1964, and Th.D. in 1967 from Grace Theological Seminary. His doctoral degree was in Old Testament and Hebrew. He did post-graduate work at the University of Edinburgh, Scotland, and the Near East School of Archaeology in Jerusalem. In 1968 he received an honorary doctorate from Trinity College of Florida.

== Career ==
Davis taught at Grace Theological Seminary from 1963 to 2003, offering courses in Old Testament, Hebrew and Archaeology. He was an executive vice president for six years and president for seven for both Grace College and GTS.

Davis has served as a pastor of two churches since his ordination. He worked as a senior supervisor on 13 archaeological digs in Israel and Jordan between 1963 and 2003. His major archaeological interest is tombs and human remains. He is a member of the Evangelical Theological Society and the Near East Archaeological Society; as of 1973, he was also a member of the American Schools of Oriental Research, the National Association of Professors of Hebrew, and the Christian fundamentalist Creation Research Society. According to David L. Baker, Davis is a proponent of "literal-day" creationism. He was a signatory to the 1978 Chicago Statement on Biblical Inerrancy.

Davis was a student of Hobart Freeman at Grace Theological Seminary until Freeman's firing in 1963. Freeman established his own congregation, the Faith Assembly, and became known as a proponent of faith healing who forbade his followers to receive medical treatment. Although he refused all media interviews, he agreed to speak informally with Davis in 1983. Davis published his account of visiting with Freeman and his congregation as a four-part series in the Warsaw Times-Union. He told the Associated Press that, in his view, Freeman was a "good theologian" who knew the Bible well, but his uncompromising stance on faith healing and the seclusion of his congregation had "resulted in personal tragedy for several people".

Davis was also a student of the creationist theologian John C. Whitcomb. He and Whitcomb were friends and colleagues at Grace Theological Seminary; they co-authored the 1980 work A History of Israel: From Conquest to Exile. GTS removed Whitcomb from his teaching position in 1990; Davis, then president of the seminary, said that Whitcomb had been a "source of division" at GTS, while Whitcomb attributed the falling out to doctrinal differences.

In 2010, a Festschrift was published in his honor. Interpreting the Psalms for Teaching and Preaching included contributions from Walter Kaiser and Eugene Merrill.

== Publications ==
Davis was a translator and contributor to the NIV Study Bible. He has written 19 books, including Biblical Numerology: A Basic Study of the Use of Numbers in the Bible (1968); Conquest and Crisis: Studies in Joshua, Judges and Ruth (1969); The Birth of a Kingdom: Studies in I-II Samuel and I Kings 1-11 (1970); Moses and the Gods of Egypt: Studies in the Book of Exodus (1971); Mummies, Men, and Madness (1972); Contemporary Counterfeits (1973); Paradise to Prison: Studies in Genesis (1975); Demons, Exorcism, and the Evangelical (1977); and What About Cremation? A Christian Perspective.

Biblical Numerology received positive reviews from Raymond F. Surburg in The Springfielder and Charles Lee Feinberg in the Journal of the Evangelical Theological Society. Surburg wrote that the book was a "scholarly study" in an area (biblical numerology) that had suffered from a lack of mainstream attention, perhaps due to its association with "cranks and crackpots". Feinberg wrote that Davis was a "careful and sane scholar" and his book was a valuable contribution to the field.

Moses and the Gods of Egypt received a positive review from Robert L. Alden in the Journal of the Evangelical Theological Society and a mixed review from Robert A. Coughenour in The Reformed Review.

Paradise to Prison received a positive review from Raymond F. Surburg in The Springfielder and a negative review from David L. Baker in the Journal of the Evangelical Theological Society. Surburg wrote that Davis had made technical material accessible to the lay reader. Baker criticised Davis for disregarding or peremptorily rejecting liberal views on the Bible. He wrote that Davis had a "simplistic understanding of the relationship between the Bible and science, often in terms of a conflict which is resolved by asserting that the Bible is right".

Davis and Whitcomb's A History of Israel combined material from three previously published books: Conquest and Crisis and The Birth of a Kingdom by Davis and Solomon to the Exile by Whitcomb. It received a mixed review from Eugene Merrill in the Journal of the Evangelical Theological Society. Merrill wrote that the book was a reliable reference work, but criticised it for covering only a limited period of Israel's history and for not engaging with more recent work in the field. The book was also reviewed by Leonidas Kalugila in the Africa Theological Journal.

What About Cremation received positive reviews from Mary Lokers in The Reformed Review and Gary C. Genzen in the Concordia Theological Quarterly, both of whom recommended it to pastors. It was also reviewed by Robert J. Kempe in the Lutheran Theological Journal.

== Personal life ==
Davis is married and has a daughter. A keen outdoorsman, he fishes and promotes wild game dinners. He wrote a weekly column called "Outdoor Scene" for the Warsaw, Indiana Times Union newspaper for 31 years, and has written several humour books about fishing. Hellen Ochs in The Republic recommended Real Fishermen Never Lie as "perfect for winter reading". The Indiana Department of Natural Resources named him Outdoor Writer of the Year in 1986.

Davis worked with the radio sportscaster Bob Chase as a colour commentator for Fort Wayne Komets hockey game broadcasts on WOWO (AM). He has recorded CDs of Gospel and Hawaiian music.

Academic offices
Preceded by Homer A. Kent, Jr	President of Grace Theological Seminary; 1986–1993	Succeeded by Ronald E. Manahan
