= Continental Singers =

Christian music organization

- Nickname: The Continentals
- Formation: 1967
- Founder: Cameron Floria
- Type: 501(c)(3) Religious Nonprofit Corporation
- Legal status: Dissolved (2011)
- Purpose: Evangelical Missions
- Headquarters: 1673 Donlon Street, Suite 201, Ventura, California, 93003
- Location: United States
- Services: Musical Production and Performance

Continental Singers, Inc (also simply called, "The Continentals") was an evangelical Christian nonprofit organization based in Ventura, California. It was founded in 1967 with a mission to, "Advance the kingdom of Jesus Christ around the world through music missions, leadership development and performing arts' ministries." It dissolved in 2011.

The organization produced over 65 recorded music albums, including several musicals and well-known worship songs. The albums and related merchandise were distributed by volunteers who were assembled into various groups to travel together and stage free live performances of selected works. A number of prominent contemporary Christian performing artists were connected to the organization either as former group members or publicity namesakes, including Sandi Patty, Wayne Watson, Amy Grant, Steve Taylor, Chuck Bolte, and even Mike Nawrocki of VeggieTales fame.

During its operation, the Continentals helped establish several sister organizations globally. These sister organizations operated independently of, though in close association with, the original Continental Singers organization. Some of them were still operating as of 2020, with support provided in part by the fundraising efforts of the organization's successor, the Continental Global Foundation.

The Continentals also partnered with other nonprofit organizations such as Compassion International and American Leprosy Missions. Groups informed audiences about the partner programs during performances and then solicited potential donors at informational booths after performances.

== Touring Groups ==
=== Schedule ===
Historically, the Continentals had an average of a dozen groups assembled and actively traveling on separate tours at any given time, with a higher percentage of groups assembled during the summer to coincide with increased availability from individuals interested in joining. Tour schedules were arranged so that each group presented a one- to two-hour performance of Continentals-produced content each evening. Tours stopped at a new venue every one to two days, which primarily consisted of Protestant churches in the United States or locally organized events such as county fairs. Certain tours also included stops in one or two other countries or regions. On occasion, multiple groups coordinated their respective tour stops to come together to present a modified and/or combined performance.

Groups were generally identified by the season, year, and first letter of a memorable keyword associated with the tour (for example, "Fall 1992 Tour 'H'" for a group that toured throughout the western United States and Hawaii).

=== Group Formation and Organization ===
Group members tended to be young adults or youth who committed to a five- to seven-week schedule, preceded by a one-week "rehearsal camp" focused on practicing the performance and making other tour preparations. Groups usually consisted of 15 to 20 volunteer singers, musicians, actors, and/or dancers; one or two audio and lighting technicians; a bus driver; and three or four accompanying adult leaders who were responsible for day-to-day supervision and administrative tasks.

As the quantity of Continentals-produced music albums grew, it started categorizing its various repertoire into distinct sets, whereby several classifications of groups developed. Each classification performed a different, though sometimes overlapping, set of content with selections that were introduced or suspended on a staggered basis. Groups were classified according to members' ages and time commitment ability. By the time of the organization's dissolution, it had five major classifications.

Classifications of Continentals Groups
Classification	Age Range	Typical Timeframe	Typical Performance
Frontline Continentals (Note: In 1996, Frontline Continentals became the new name for the "regular, normal Continental Singers".)	16 to 25 years old	Six to eight weeks	Song selections performed by singers as a group, moderately choreographed and accompanied by recorded "tracks" (instrumental-only)
Young Continentals	13 to 15 years old	Six to eight weeks	Song selections performed by singers as a group, energetically choreographed and accompanied by tracks, usually with a skit during every fourth or fifth song transition
Encore Continentals	25 years old and older	Two to three weeks	Song selections performed by singers as a group and accompanied by tracks
Continental Orchestra	16 years old and older	Three months	Musicals performed by actors/singers and dancers accompanied by a live orchestra
Continental Singers and Brass	16 years old and older	Three months	Song selections performed by singers as a group accompanied by a live band

=== Transportation/Travel, Room and Board ===
Generally, groups traveled together in a tour bus, which also carried the audio-visual equipment and stage equipment necessary for the performance. If a tour included stops in certain international locations, the group's travel might require a flight and performances using less equipment.

To better connect with audiences and reduce costs, group leaders would try to secure members with overnight rooming from families and individuals affiliated with the tour stop's local sponsor/venue. Two or more members were assigned to a "host home," and hosts were asked to provide their members/guests with breakfast and a packed lunch the following morning.

=== Leadership Development ===
Because of the nature of the group composition and emphasis that performances should be professional quality, the Continentals actively sought to develop leadership traits and habits in its group members, particularly adult leaders designated as tour directors and assistant tour directors. Performances offered group leaders and other members opportunities to contribute to creative productions, perform and speak publicly, and solicit potential donors. Tours also required adult leaders to monitor the fulfillment of day-to-day plans, direct group activity, influence members' behavior and dynamics, steward the group's finances, and manage unforeseen problems while adhering to clear guidelines and limitations.

Accordingly, the organization inspired many group members to take paid and unpaid leadership positions with other organizations once returning home such as church music directors, community leaders, and music industry contributors.

== History ==
=== Roots ===
After graduating with a bachelor's degree from Northwestern College (now University of Northwestern – St. Paul), Cameron Floria was asked to lead music for a chapter of Youth for Christ in Lansing, Michigan, Floria's hometown. Then, in the autumn of 1962, he took a paid staff position as music director at Youth for Christ's chapter in Portland, Oregon.

During his work in Portland, Floria organized a five-week tour for the choir with a final stop at the choral competition at the Winona Lake Bible Conference in the summer of 1963. The following autumn, he produced an album with the choir entitled Sing A Happy Song credited to, "Cam Floria and the Continentals" with 14 medleys of songs commonly sang at Youth for Christ chapter meetings nationally, which Word Records agreed to distribute. He produced three more albums in 1964 and 1965, took time to obtain his master of music degree in music education from Michigan State University, and relocated to southern California to be closer to acquaintance and composer Ralph Carmichael. Together, Floria and Carmichael sought to start a traveling music ensemble fashioned after Thurlow Spurr's group The Spurrlows, with whom Floria had worked previously.

=== Growth ===
The Continentals filed its articles of incorporation in 1967, with Floria and Carmichael listed as the board members. From 1968 to 1971, the number of groups actively traveling increased from three to five, which started to include tour stops in other countries. The free performances were welcomed and well received at tour stop locations, and like-minded audience members sought to either join a Continentals group or start similar programs.

In the early 1970s, the Continentals collaborated with affiliated groups New Hope and Jeremiah People, to produce three musicals It's Getting Late, The Apostle, and Share. In 1983, Floria finished composing the musical Dreamer about the life of Joseph the Israelite patriarch, which the Continentals produced and for which it received a Dove Award in 1984 from the Gospel Music Association. Throughout this time, the Continentals continued to produce other music albums of individual worship songs and Christian music.

In 1975, Floria started organizing an annual week-long conference called Seminar in the Rockies (Note: In 2000, the Gospel Music Association started organizing the event and, in 2004, retitled it as GMA Music in the Rockies. In 2009, it was retitled again as Immerse and moved to Nashville, Tennessee.) which consisted of workshops held by Christian music and other professionals. The conference was abundantly attended by both established and hopeful industry participants and helped Floria maintain the Continentals' relevance in Christian music, which grew significantly during the 1980s and 1990s.

The organization started recruiting 13- to 15-year-old youth in 1992 for a distinct classification of groups and music albums called the "Young Continentals." Similarly, in 1994, it started a classification of groups called the "Encore Continentals" for members over 25 years old, as well as in 1996 renamed groups with members from the organization's historical demographic as "Frontline Continentals."

In 1996, Floria composed a new musical David: A Man After God's Own Heart about the life of the Israelite king David, which he premiered globally with a performance near David's Citadel in Jerusalem with approximately 800 performers and musicians. The Continentals later produced an album of the musical, which the Continental Orchestra performed during several tours starting in 1998.

By 1999, more than 400 groups had presented about 26,000 performances of Continentals-produced content; and, by 2008, more than 65,000 people globally had been group members with a tour of the Continentals or one of its associated organizations.

== Financial Model and Decline ==
The Continentals operated as a 501(c)(3) religious nonprofit corporation with the large majority of its support being donations and some support coming from sales of recorded music albums and related merchandise. Between 2003 and 2007, donations and sales accounted for 96 percent and 4 percent of support, or $12.8 million and $0.6 million, respectively.

The Continentals' financial sustainability was largely dependent on the recruitment of group members and quantity of active tours. Even though the Continentals produced and performed musical and theatrical works, the content itself did not include works for hire. It paid royalties to content creators, rather than collecting royalties from venues. While the Continentals covered group members' transportation/travel, room, and board, it also asked most prospective members to make a donation before arriving at rehearsal camp to cover their own portion of the total expected costs of the tour. Love offerings were taken during each performance to defray some costs, but the large majority of support was donated by group members themselves.

From 2002 to 2008, annual support declined 69 percent from $3.1 million to $1.0 million. In 2010, the organization stopped operations, hoping only temporarily, but Floria announced a dissolution on March 11, 2011. He cited causes of the decline to be, "the economic situation in the United States" and "fewer participating groups to keep operations alive." Other factors may have included the steady decline in church membership in the United States; the Continentals' lack of digital music delivery; (Note: The original Continental Singers organization had no digital delivery accounts, but some of its sister organizations have them such as the Korean Continental Singers (한국-컨티넨탈-싱어즈) Apple Music channel.) an increase in the quantity and variety of Christian music to which consumers had access; a preference by Millennials and Post-Millennials to reside near large cities that offer more opportunities to attend free live performances; and expanding metropolitan populations in which young adults and youth have more outlets for creative expression (compared to the rural areas that many Continentals tours historically frequented).

== Discography ==
For audio recordings produced by the Continental Singers and its sister organizations, see Continental Singers Discography.
