= 1959 Prohibition National Convention =

- 1960 presidential election

- Nominees (Decker & Munn)

Convention
- Dates: September 1–3, 1959
- City: Winona Lake, Indiana
- Venue: Westminster Hotel

Candidates
- Presidential nominee: Rutherford Decker of Missouri
- Vice-presidential nominee: E. Harold Munn of Michigan

Voting
- Total delegates: ~300 (attending); 95 (voting)
- Results (president): 95
- Results (vice president): 95
- Ballots: 1

The 1959 Prohibition National Convention was held September 1–3, 1959, at the Westminster Hotel in Winona Lake, Indiana. A presidential nominating convention for the 1960 United States presidential election, it saw the Prohibition Party nominate Rutherford Decker of Missouri for president, and E. Harold Munn of Michigan for vice president.

== Logistics ==
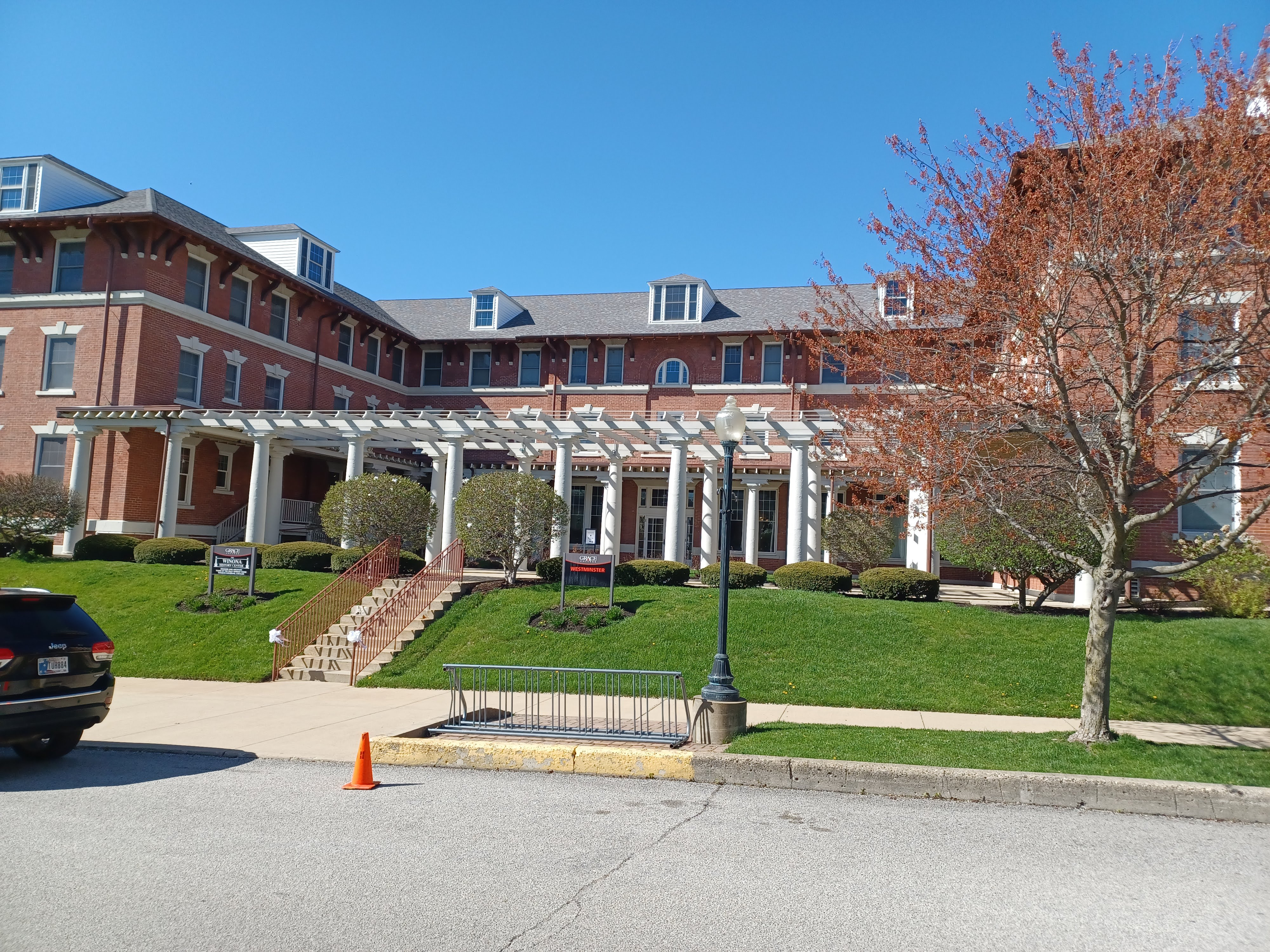
The former Westminster Hotel, venue of the convention

The Prohibition Party was the first party of any existing notability to nominate its ticket for the 1960 United States presidential election. Its convention was held September 1–3, 1959, at the Westminster Hotel in Winona Lake in the state of Indiana.

The state of Indiana was a regular location for the party's conventions. Indianapolis had been the site of the 1888, 1904, 1932, 1943, and 1951 conventions. Winona Lake had previously hosted the 1947 convention, while nearby Milford hosted the 1955 convention. This made 1959 the fifth consecutive presidential convention that the party had held in Indiana.

The convention featured nearly 300 delegates hailing from seventeen (Note: California, Delaware, District of Columbia, Florida, Illinois, Indiana, Kansas, Kentucky, Maryland, Massachusetts, Michigan, Missouri, New Jersey, New York, Ohio, Pennsylvania) state delegations. Earl Dodge served as temporary chairman during the convention.

== Schedule and speeches ==
The first day of the convention featured a session with an address by E. Harold Munn of Michigan, the party's chairman. It also featured caucuses by state delegations in the afternoon, and an annual party banquet in the evening.

The second day of the convention featured committee reports. It also featured several speeches.

The final evening of the convention featured the first meeting of the new national committee of the party, speeches, and the selection of the party's presidential and vice presidential nominee.

== Nominations ==
For president the party nominated Rutherford Decker of Missouri, a Kansas City-based Baptist minister. For president, the party nominated E. Harold Munn of Michigan, the assistant dean of Hillsdale College and the chair of the party. Both were nominated unopposed. On both nominations, 95 total delegates voted from fifteen state delegations.

== Platform ==
Beyond its support for reimposing prohibition, the party's platform advocated for:

- a balanced federal budget
- tax cuts
- ceasing nuclear weapons testing
- "right-to-work" laws

== Aftermath ==
The nominated ticket received 46,203 votes nationally in the presidential election, equivalent to 0.07% of the popular vote. This marked a marginal increase in votes from the previous election. No subsequent election has seen the Prohibition Party come close to this level of support.

The party later moved its national office to Winona Lake, locating it there from 1961 to 1962.
