= Alexander Mack =

Co-founder and first pastor of the Schwarzenau Brethren

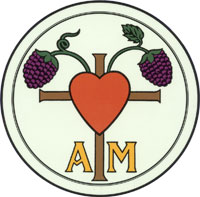
- Mack's personal crest
- Church: Schwarzenau Brethren (German Baptist)

Orders
- Ordination: Minister, elder

Personal details
- Born: 27 July 1679 Schriesheim, Electoral Palatinate, Holy Roman Empire
- Died: 19 January 1735 (aged 55) Germantown, Philadelphia, Province of Pennsylvania, British America
- Buried: Upper Burying Ground, Germantown, Philadelphia, Pennsylvania, United States
- Denomination: Anabaptist
- Residence: Schriesheim, Palatinate; Friesland, Netherlands; and Schwarzenau, Bad Berleburg, Germany and Germantown, Philadelphia, Pennsylvania, United States
- Parents: Johann Phillip Mack (father) and Christina Fillbrun Mack (mother)
- Spouse: Anna Margarethe Kling
- Children: Johann Valentine, Johannes, and Alexander Mack, Jr. (sons) and Christina and unnamed infant (daughters)
- Occupation: Composer, elder and minister, philanthropist, theologian
- Profession: Miller
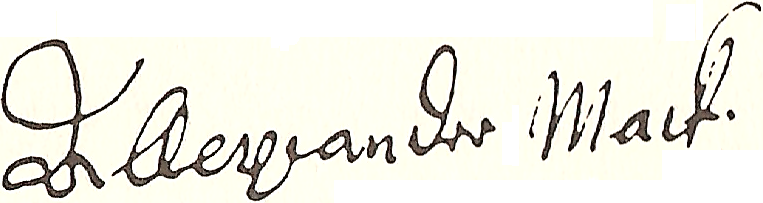
- Signature: Alexander Mack's signature

Alexander Mack (c. 27 July 1679^{[a]} – 19 January 1735) was a German clergyman and the leader and first minister of the Schwarzenau Brethren (or German Baptists) in the Schwarzenau, Wittgenstein, community of modern-day Bad Berleburg, North Rhine-Westphalia, Germany. Mack founded the Brethren along with seven other Radical Pietists in Schwarzenau in 1708. Mack and the rest of the early Brethren emigrated to the United States in the mid-18th century, where he continued to minister to the Brethren community until his death.

== Early life and founding of the Brethren ==
Mack was born in Schriesheim, Palatinate, in contemporary Baden-Württemberg, Germany, where he worked as a miller. He was born the third son to miller Johann Phillip Mack and his wife Christina Fillbrun Mack and was baptized into the local Reformed church on 27 July 1679. The Macks remained in Schriesheim throughout the Nine Years' War, intermittently seeking refuge in the hill country because of violence. Upon finishing his studies, Mack took over the family mill and married Anna Margarethe Kling on 18 January 1701. By 1705, the Macks became moved by the Pietist movement locally led by Ernst Christoph Hochmann von Hochnau and started to host an illegal Bible study and prayer group at their home.

In the early 1700s, Graf (Count) Henrich Albrecht Sayn-Wittgenstein provided refuge to religious dissenters from other German states and elsewhere. Many were settled around the small village of Schwarzenau, including Mack and his followers. The era of toleration for radical Pietism lasted only until about 1740, but had few precedents at the time and was denounced by the rulers of most other German states. Schwarzenau is now part of the town of Bad Berleburg in the district of Siegen-Wittgenstein in the state of North Rhine-Westphalia. The school (now closed) in Schwarzenau was named in honor of Alexander Mack.

The initial group that became known as the Schwarzenau Brethren were inaugurated by Mack as a Bible study with four other men and three women. In 1708—having become convinced of the necessity of Believer's baptism—the group decided to baptize themselves, using a lottery system to choose who would baptize one another in the Eder.

== Emigration to the American Colonies ==
In 1719, a branch of the Schwarzenau Brethren—led by Peter Becker—emigrated to Germantown, Philadelphia, Pennsylvania Province (now in the United States) for religious freedom. Mack and several other Brethren emigrated to Friesland in the Netherlands because of pressure within the interfaith community in Schwarzenau in 1720. However, the Brethren in Friesland were impoverished, and the community was unable to sustain itself. In 1729, Mack and about 30 Brethren families sailed from Rotterdam for Philadelphia. The arrival of the 1729 emigrants immediately brought renewed vitality and new members to the American Brethren, who had become less active since their migration. Mack's leadership was pivotal in sustaining this vitality, and it noticeably slackened upon his death in 1735.

== Teachings and writings ==
Prior to the formation of any strict doctrine, the Schwarzenau Brethren espoused several fundamental tenets that would define the Brethren movement, including a rejection of any coercion in religion (such as infant baptism), viewing Christian rites and ordinances as a means of grace, and the New Testament as the only creed and Rule of Faith. Mack was a Universalist and strict pacifist.

== Footnotes ==
Some sources (e.g. Schulz 1954) cite this as Mack's birthday, others (e.g. Eberly; Willoughby 1991, p. 1) refer to this as his date of baptism.

== Works cited ==
- Grebe, Ursula (1965). "Warum Alexander-Mack-Schule?". In Krämer, Fritz (ed.). Wittgenstein. Vol. II. Balve, Germany. pp. 36–41.
- Lückel, Ulf (2009). "Die Anfänge des radikalen Pietismus in Wittgenstein". In Burkardt, Johannes; Hey, Bernd (eds.). Von Wittgenstein in die Welt: Radikale Frömmigkeit und religiöse Toleranz. Bielefeld, Germany. pp. 41–68. ISBN 978-3-7858-0452-0.
- Mack, Alexander (1991) [1708–1720], Eberly, William R. (ed.), The Complete Writings of Alexander Mack (1st ed.), Winona Lake, Indiana, United States: BMH Books, ISBN 0-936693-12-6
  - Willoughby, William G. (1991). "The Life of Alexander Mack". The Complete Writings of Alexander Mack. pp. 1–6.
- Schulz, Lawrence W. (1954), Schwarzenau Yesterday and Today (1st ed.), Winona Lake, Indiana, United States: Light and Life Press
- Stoeffler, F.E. (2007). Continental Pietism and Early American Christianity. Wipf & Stock. ISBN 978-1-55635-226-3.
- Stoffer, Dale R. (1989), William R. Eberly (ed.), Background and Development of Brethren Doctrines 1650–1987, Brethren Encyclopedia Monograph Series, vol. 2 (1st ed.), Philadelphia, Pennsylvania, United States: Brethren Encyclopedia, Inc., ISBN 0-936693-22-3
