= Billy Sunday Home =

Historical home of baseball player Billy Sunday

Billy Sunday Home Museum
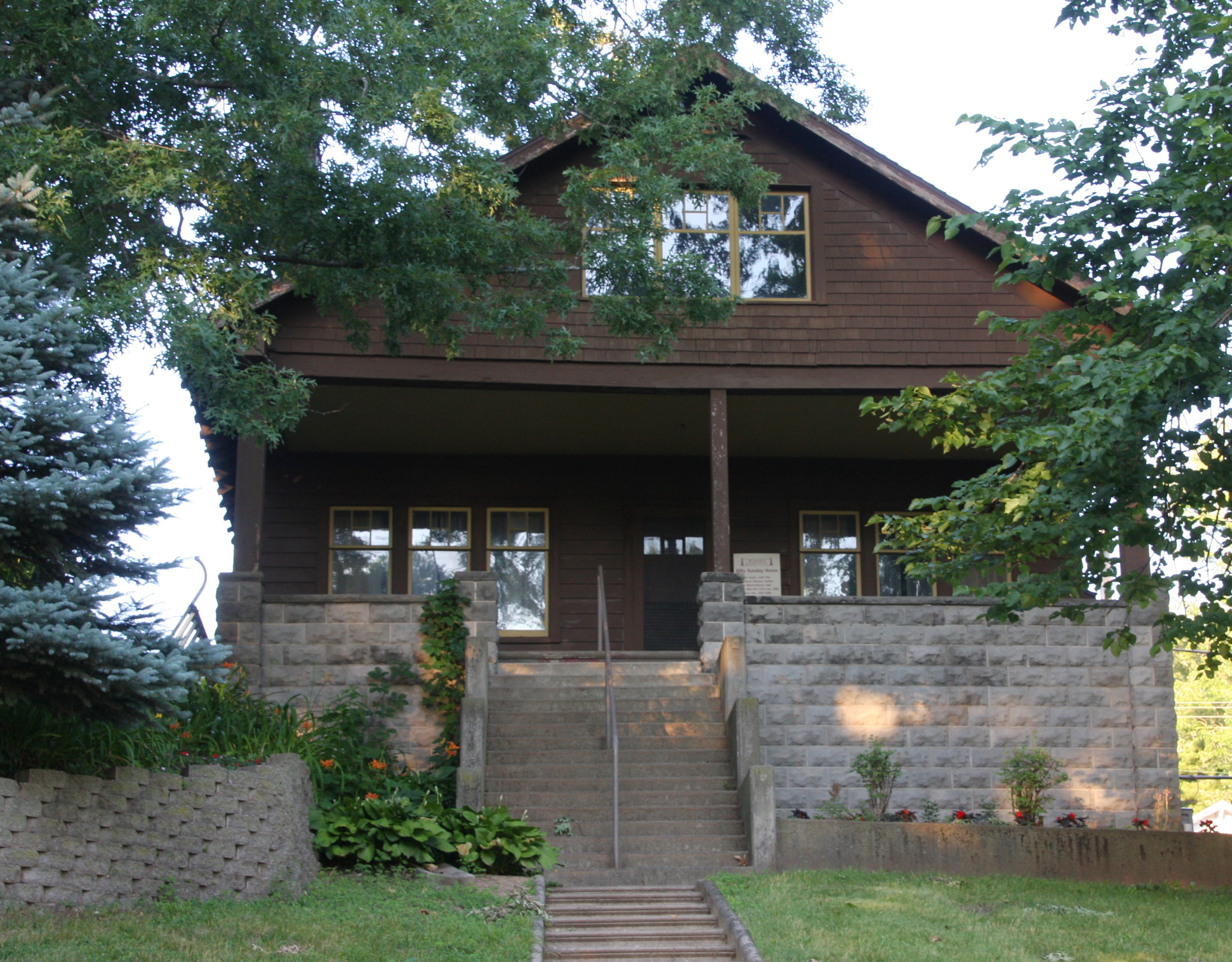
- The building at its original location in 2016
- Location: 1111 Sunday Lane, Winona Lake, Indiana
- Coordinates: 41°13′29″N 85°49′12″W
- Website: Official website

The Billy Sunday Home was the residence of William A (Billy) Sunday, Helen (Ma) Sunday, their four children, and the family's live-in housekeeper and nanny. Located in the Winona Lake Historic District in Kosciusko County, Indiana, it is a prime example of a bungalow built in the Arts and Crafts architectural style.

The Sunday family spent their summers in Winona Lake for several years prior to 1911, staying in a home called "The Illinois" located on a bluff overlooking MacDonald Island and the lake. In 1911 the family moved permanently to Winona Lake. The Illinois was lifted off its foundation and moved eastward across the street and a new bungalow was constructed in its place. The Sundays named the home Mount Hood. (They owned property in Oregon not far from Mount Hood and this was presumably the inspiration behind the name.)

Many features of the home are typical of the Arts and Crafts Movement including the interior woodwork, shellacked burlap wall treatments, light fixtures, sleeping porches, and it's exposed rafter tails and beams. It is believed that Helen Sunday was intimately involved in the interior's design. One of her favorite places in the home was the Inglenook, a cozy seating area that surrounds the fireplace.

Helen Sunday outlived all four of the children as well as her husband. By the 1950s, when Helen lived in the residence alone, the home was already becoming something of a pilgrimage site for admirers who wanted to see where the famed evangelist had lived. Helen thus began to provide informal tours of her home. In 1957, the year she died, a recording of Mrs. Sunday describing the details of the home was made and the published transcript has served to verify the fact that the home's interior, other than some rearranging, has been largely preserved as it was when she lived there.

Helen willed the home, along with everything in it, to the Winona Christian Assembly. When the assembly grounds were purchased by Grace College and Theological Seminary in 1968, Mt. Hood became part of Grace Schools. Most of the manuscript materials from the home were collected by the Grace College and Seminary library and these became the Billy Sunday Papers, the originals of which are housed in the Morgan Library Archives.

Prior to 1998, the home had never been professionally curated. With the creation of the Village at Winona and the renaissance of the Winona Lake Historic District, however, a professional curator was hired to oversee restoration of the home and curate a new Billy Sunday museum and visitor center, which was built near the Sunday property and opened in 2000. The visitors center educated guests about the historical significance of Billy Sunday and a team of volunteers led tours through the home. Although multiple efforts were made to organize the setup as a state-run historical site, this never materialized and when the principal donor removed funding from the operation, the museum and visitor center closed in 2010. Currently, the home is curated by the Winona History Center at Grace College, which also offers tours.
