= Grace College & Seminary =

Evangelical college in Winona Lake, Indiana, US

Grace College & Grace Theological Seminary
- Motto: To know Christ and to make Him known
- Type: Private college
- Established: 1948
- Religious affiliation: Charis Fellowship
- Endowment: $10 million
- President: Andrew Ralston "Drew" Flamm
- Provost: Kevin Roberts
- Students: 2,304
- Undergraduates: 1,795
- Postgraduates: 509
- Location: Winona Lake, Indiana, United States; 41.225861°N 85.815915°W
- Campus: Rural, 180 acres (73 ha)
- Colors: Red & White
- Nickname: Lancers
- Sporting affiliations: NAIA – Crossroads; NCCAA Division I – Midwest
- Website: grace.edu

Grace College & Grace Theological Seminary is a private evangelical Christian college in Winona Lake, Indiana, United States. It comprises seven schools: the School of Ministry Studies, School of Arts and Humanities, School of Science and Engineering, School of Behavioral Sciences, School of Business, School of Education, and the School of Professional & Online Education.

Grace Theological Seminary, which began as the parent institution, now exists as part of the School of Ministry Studies and is also located on the Winona Lake campus. Since 2011, several commuter campuses have also started. While the college and seminary are historically affiliated with the Fellowship of Grace Brethren Churches, known as Charis Fellowship since 2018, the student body and faculty of both institutions have diverse denominational backgrounds.

== History ==
=== Foundation ===
The institution began with the organization of Grace Theological Seminary under the leadership of Alva J. McClain in 1937. A two-year "undergraduate division" of the seminary was added in 1948 and has since transitioned into a four-year college.

=== Presidents ===
Alva J. McClain served as president until 1962, when he was succeeded by his colleague and fellow co-founder Herman A. Hoyt. He remained in this position until he retired in 1976, and was followed by then Dean of Grace Theological Seminary Homer Kent Jr., who retained this position until his own retirement in 1986. John J. Davis then served in the position from 1986 to 1993. Ronald E. Manahan replaced Davis and led the institution until 2013 at which time William J. Katip, who had been Provost since 2007, replaced Manahan. In January 2022, John Teevan replaced Katip as interim president and served until July 2022 when Drew Flamm became the seventh president. Flamm previously served as Vice President of Advancement at Grace College, a position he held since 2013. New initiatives implemented in the fall of 2013 included an adjusted calendar in which each of the semesters were divided into two 8-week sessions.

=== Catalyst Corridor Project ===
In August 2024, Grace College received a $27 million grant from Lilly Endowment Inc., marking the largest single donation in the school's history. The grant was awarded through the College and Community Collaboration (CCC) initiative to partially fund the Catalyst Corridor Project. Developed in partnership with the town of Winona Lake and the city of Warsaw, the project includes regional enhancements such as a new Business Innovation Center, an Orthopedic Innovation & Research Center, and various community wellbeing amenities.

=== Secondary locations ===
==== Prison program ====
For many years Grace College maintained a ministry to the incarcerated in Indiana at various correctional facilities throughout the state directed by John Teevan. However, due to legal changes in the state of Indiana, this ministry has transitioned to a GED program. The institution now manages the GED program for five correction facilities in northern Indiana.

==== Commuter schools ====
Since 2011, Grace College has added a satellite location in Indianapolis that offered associates and bachelor's degree completion. It was located at 96th and Meridian on the North side of Indianapolis. The Indianapolis location has since closed, but the institution has since opened and developed a new location in Akron, Ohio.

== Accreditation ==
In 1994, the North Central Association of Colleges and Schools accredited Grace College and Seminary, thereby joining the two previously individually accredited institutions. Its counseling program is accredited by the Council for the Accreditation of Counseling and Related Educational Programs (CACREP) and the School of Business has accreditation by the International Assembly for Collegiate Business Education (IACBE). It is also approved by the Association of Christian Schools International. Grace College's School of Education also holds separate accreditation from the National Council for Accreditation of Teacher Education (NCATE) and is recognized as a REPA Approved Teacher Preparation Program by the Indiana Department of Education

Grace Theological Seminary has separately been awarded accreditation by the Association of Theological Schools in the United States and Canada.

In August 2022, the Grace Department of Engineering was accredited by the ABET Engineering Accreditation Commission (EAC). Since May 2021, the Grace program has granted the Bachelor of Science in Mechanical Engineering (BSME) degree. Grace Engineering operates in East Hall.

== Campus ==
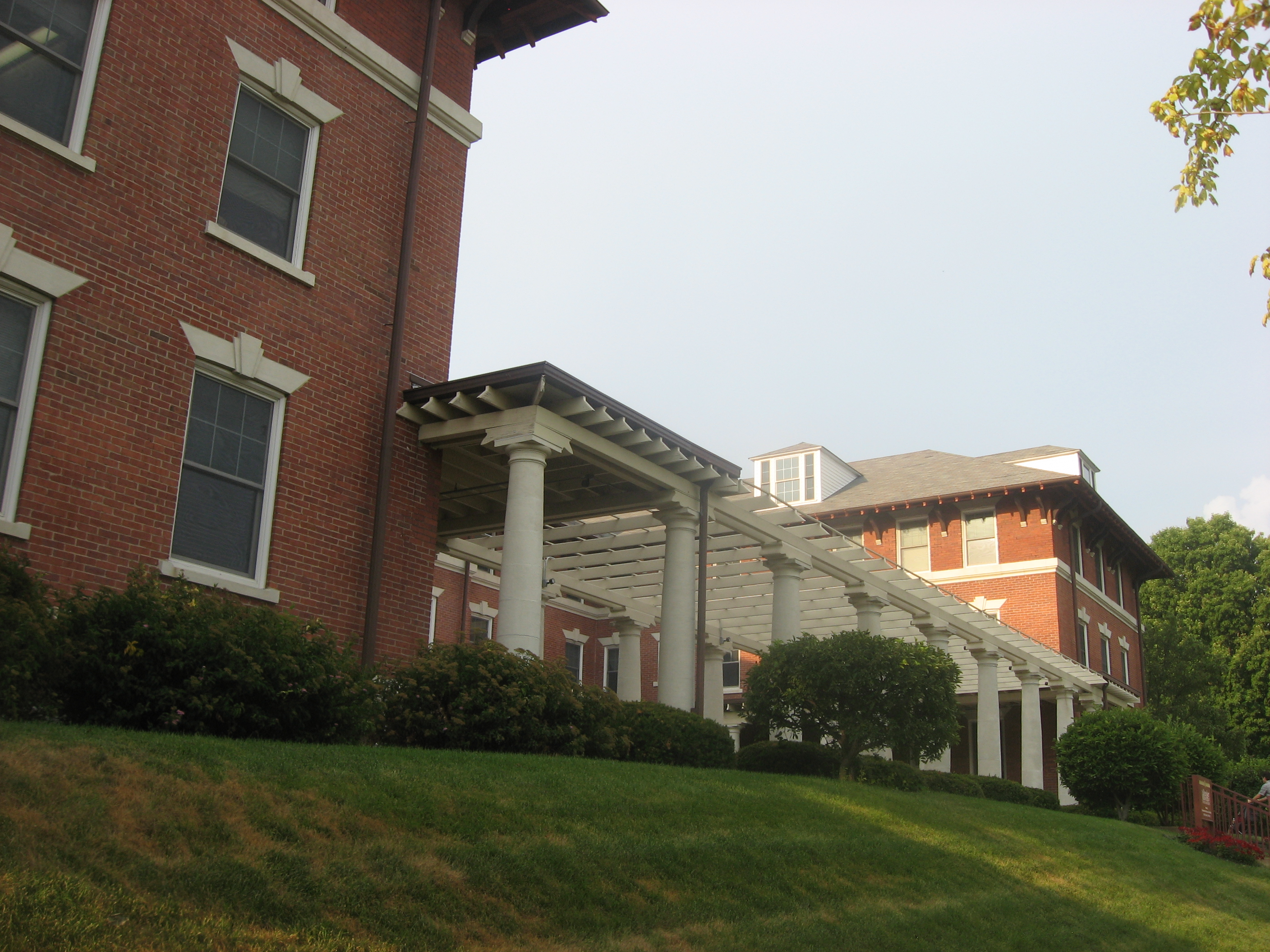
Westminster Hall on the Grace campus, now a Billy Sunday museum and resident hall

There are a total of 21 buildings on Grace College's campus. Eleven of these buildings are residence halls, with the Lancer lofts, the Lodge and Omega Hall being as the most recent additions.

== Student life ==
=== College newspaper ===
The student-led college newspaper, The Sounding Board, is published biweekly.

=== Chapel ===
Grace College students attend chapel sessions Tuesday, Thursday, and Friday mornings in the Manahan Orthopaedic Capital Center on campus.

=== Intramurals ===
Grace College offers intramural sports in both the fall and spring semesters, with their most popular being the "Beanie Bowl", an 11-on-11 flag football event between grade levels.

== Athletics ==
The Grace athletic teams are the Lancers. The college is a member of the National Association of Intercollegiate Athletics (NAIA), primarily competing in the Crossroads League (formerly known as the Mid-Central College Conference (MCCC) until after the 2011–12 school year) since the 1981–82 academic year; they were a member of the conference on a previous occasion from 1959–60 to 1978–79. They are also a member of the National Christian College Athletic Association (NCCAA), primarily competing as an independent in the Midwest Region of the Division I level. Across all sports, Grace has won one NAIA national championship (men's basketball), 10 NCCAA national championships, and 44 conference championships.

Grace competes in 19 intercollegiate varsity sports: Men's sports include baseball, basketball, bowling, cross country, golf, soccer, tennis and track & field; while women's sports include basketball, bowling, cross country, golf, soccer, softball, tennis, track & field and volleyball; and co-ed sports include cheerleading and eSports.

In August 2024, Grace became the first college in the United States to announce a uniform sponsorship deal across all levels of collegiate athletics. The college signed a three-year deal for Zimmer Biomet to have its logo on all of the colleges athletic uniforms.

=== Mascot ===
Their mascot is Sir Red.

=== Basketball ===
Grace's men's basketball program was coached by Jim Kessler for 42 seasons from 1977 to 2019 and won the NAIA Division II men's championship in 1992 with a 85–79 OT victory over Northwestern (IA), and, in 2013, advanced to the Final Four. On October 31, 2014, Coach Kessler achieved his 700th career coaching win. Since 2019, Grace has been led by Coach Scott Moore, a former Grace player and long time assistant coach. The 2021–2022 season began a run of great success for the program as Grace captured the Crossroads League tournament title and made a run to the Sweet 16 of the NAIA tournament, which included an upset of #2 seed Olivet Nazarene. The 2022–2023 men's basketball team got off to the best start in program history and captured the Crossroads League regular season and conference tournament title and ended the season with a 31–4 record and an appearance in the quarterfinals of the NAIA tournament.

The women's basketball team has been led by Coach Dan Davis since 2018 and the 2022–23 season produced the best season in program history.

== See also ==
- Louis S. Bauman
- John C. Whitcomb
- Louie Giglio
- Billy Sunday Home, a museum associated with Grace College & Seminary
