= Alva J. McClain =

Alva J. McClain (1888–1968) was the co-founder and first president of Grace Theological Seminary and Grace College. He served in that capacity from 1937 until his retirement in 1962, when he was named president emeritus. He was part of the Brethren church.

== Early life ==
McClain was born in Aurelia Iowa to Walter Scott McClain and Mary Ellen Gnagey; he was one of eight children.

He attended the University of Washington; a keen sports player, a baseball injury led to him dropping out of college at the age of 20 and working for his father. Two years later he attended a conference led by Louis S. Bauman where he committed his life to Christ and enrolled at the Bible Institute of Los Angeles.

== Career ==
He served as professor of Christian theology at GTS. He previously taught at the Philadelphia School of the Bible, the Bible Institute of Los Angeles, Ashland College, and Ashland Theological Seminary. He and fellow Ashland lecturer Herman A. Hoyt opened the Grace Theological Seminary in 1937.

A widely known lecturer and writer, he was a charter member of the Evangelical Theological Society, served on the Scofield Reference Bible Revision Committee, and was a member of Phi Beta Kappa.

== Family life ==
McClain was married to Josephine, who died in 1990.

== Published works ==
McClain wrote a number of books including;

- Alva J. McClain, The Greatness of The Kingdom: An Inductive Study of the Kingdom of God (BMH Books, 1959).
- Alva J. McClain, Romans: The Gospel of God's Grace (BMH Books, 1973).

== See also ==
Charis Alliance

Academic offices
Preceded by New Office	President of Grace Theological Seminary; 1937–1962	Succeeded by Herman A. Hoyt
