= R. A. Torrey =

American evangelist, pastor, educator, and writer (1856 – 1928)

The Reverend Reuben Archer Torrey
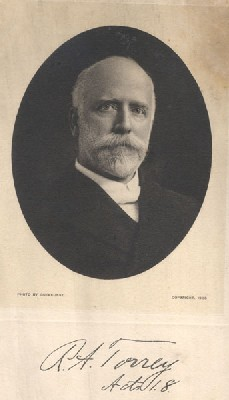
- Evangelist, pastor, and writer
- Born: 28 January 1856; Hoboken, New Jersey, U.S.
- Died: 26 October 1928 (aged 72); Asheville, North Carolina, U.S.
- Education: Yale University; Yale Divinity School

Reuben Archer Torrey (28 January 1856 – 26 October 1928) was an American evangelist, Congregational pastor, educator, and writer. He aligned with Keswick theology.

== Biography ==
Torrey was born in Hoboken, New Jersey, the son of a banker. He was graduated from Yale University in 1875 and from Yale Divinity School in 1878, following which he became a Congregational minister in Garrettsville, Ohio. In 1879, he married Clara Smith, and they had five children.

After further studies in theology at Leipzig University and Erlangen University in 1882–1883, Torrey joined Dwight L. Moody in his evangelistic work in Chicago in 1889 and became superintendent of the Bible Institute of the Chicago Evangelization Society (now Moody Bible Institute). In 1894, he became pastor of the Chicago Avenue Church (now the Moody Church).

In 1898, Torrey served as a chaplain with the YMCA at Camp Chickamauga during the Spanish–American War. During World War I, he performed similar service at Camp Bowie (a POW camp in Texas) and at Camp Kearny.

In 1902–1903, he preached in nearly every part of the English-speaking world and with song leader Charles McCallon Alexander conducted revival services in Great Britain from 1903 to 1905. During this period, he also visited China, Japan, Australia, and India. Torrey conducted a similar campaign in American and Canadian cities in 1906–1907. Throughout these campaigns, Torrey used a meeting style that he borrowed from Moody's campaigns of the 1870s.

In 1912, Torrey was persuaded to build another institution like Moody Bible Institute, and from 1912 to 1924, he served as dean of the Bible Institute of Los Angeles (now Biola University) and contributed to the BIOLA publication, The King's Business. Beginning in 1915, he served as the first pastor of the Church of the Open Door, Los Angeles. Torrey was one of the three editors of The Fundamentals, a 12-volume series that gave its name to what came to be called "fundamentalism".

In 1918 a group of Christian fundamentalists led by William Bell Riley met in Torrey's house to organize what became the World Christian Fundamentals Association (WCFA) to fight against theological liberalism.

Torrey held his last evangelistic meeting in Florida in 1927, additional meetings being canceled because of his failing health. He died at home in Asheville, North Carolina, on October 26, 1928, having preached throughout the world and written more than 40 books. He was 72 years old. He was buried on the grounds of Montrose Bible Conference in Montrose, Pennsylvania, which he founded in 1908.

=== Honors ===
In 1907, he accepted an honorary doctorate from Wheaton College. Torrey-Gray Auditorium, the main auditorium at Moody, was named for Torrey and his successor, James M. Gray. At Biola, the Torrey Honors Institute honors him, as does the university's annual Bible conference.

== Bibliography ==
- How to Bring Men to Christ, (E-text) (1893)
- The Baptism with the Holy Spirit, (E-text) (1895)
- How to Study the Bible for Greatest Profit, (E-text) (1896)
- How to Obtain Fullness of Power in Christian Life and Service (1897)
- What the Bible Teaches, (1898)
- Divine Origin of the Bible, () (1899)
- How to Pray, (E-text) (1900)
- Treasury of Scripture Knowledge, (1900)
- How to Promote and Conduct a Successful Revival, (1901)
- How to Work for Christ, (1901)
- Revival Addresses, (E-text) (1903)
- Talks to Men About the Bible and the Christ of the Bible, (1904)
- Real Salvation and Whole-Hearted Service (1905)
- The Bible and Its Christ: Being Noonday Talks with Business Men on Faith and Unbelief (1906)
- How to Succeed in the Christian Life, (E-text) (1906)
- Difficulties in the Bible, (1907)
- Studies in the Life and Teachings of our Lord, (1909)
- The Person and Work of the Holy Spirit (E-Text) (1910)
- The Fundamentals: a Testimony to the Truth Editor, (four volumes) ISBN 0-8010-8809-7 (1910–1917)
- The Higher Criticism and the NewTheology (1911)
- The Voice of God in the Present Hour (1917)
- The Importance and Value of Proper Bible Study, (E-text) (1921)
- The Gospel for Today (1922)
- Is the Bible the Inerrant Word of God?: And was the Body of Jesus Raised from the Dead? (1922)
- Why God Used D. L. Moody, (1923) (modern reprint by CrossReach Publications, 2016)
- The God of the Bible (1923)
- The Power of Prayer and the Prayer of Power, (1924)
- The Bible, the Peerless Book: Gods Own Book and Gods Only Book (1925)
- The Holy Spirit: Who He Is and What He Does and How to Know Him in All the Fulness of His Gracious and Glorious Ministry (1927)
- The Fundamental Doctrines of the Christian Faith, (E-text)
- Torrey's Topical Textbook
