= Torrey's Topical Textbook =

Torrey's Topical Textbook is a reference book or concordance for topics found in the Holy Bible. It contains subject index guides to topics found throughout the scriptures. The work contains 628 entries and over 20,000 scripture references.

It was published long enough ago that the original edition is believed to be out of copyright, but the exact year of publication is not known from sources cited here.

Reverend R.A. Torrey was known for his prolific writings on religious subjects including Methods of Bible Study.

It is currently available in print from Sword of the Light Publishers, where it has ISBN 978-0-87398-607-6. Due to the text not being under copyright, it is also popular for inclusion on CD-ROMs such as Cokesbury's Bible Discovery Library CD-ROM, UPC 72798501118.

Title Statement from library record: The New topical text book : a Scripture text book for the use of ministers, teachers, and all Christian workers / with introduction on methods of Bible study by R.A. Torrey; with an appendix of outline of the fundamental doctrine of the Bible by David Allen Reed. Published: Chicago : Revell, c1897. Call Number: MAIN BS 432 .N4 1897
