= Winona Lake Historic District =

Historic district in Indiana, United States

- U.S. National Register of Historic Places
- U.S. Historic district
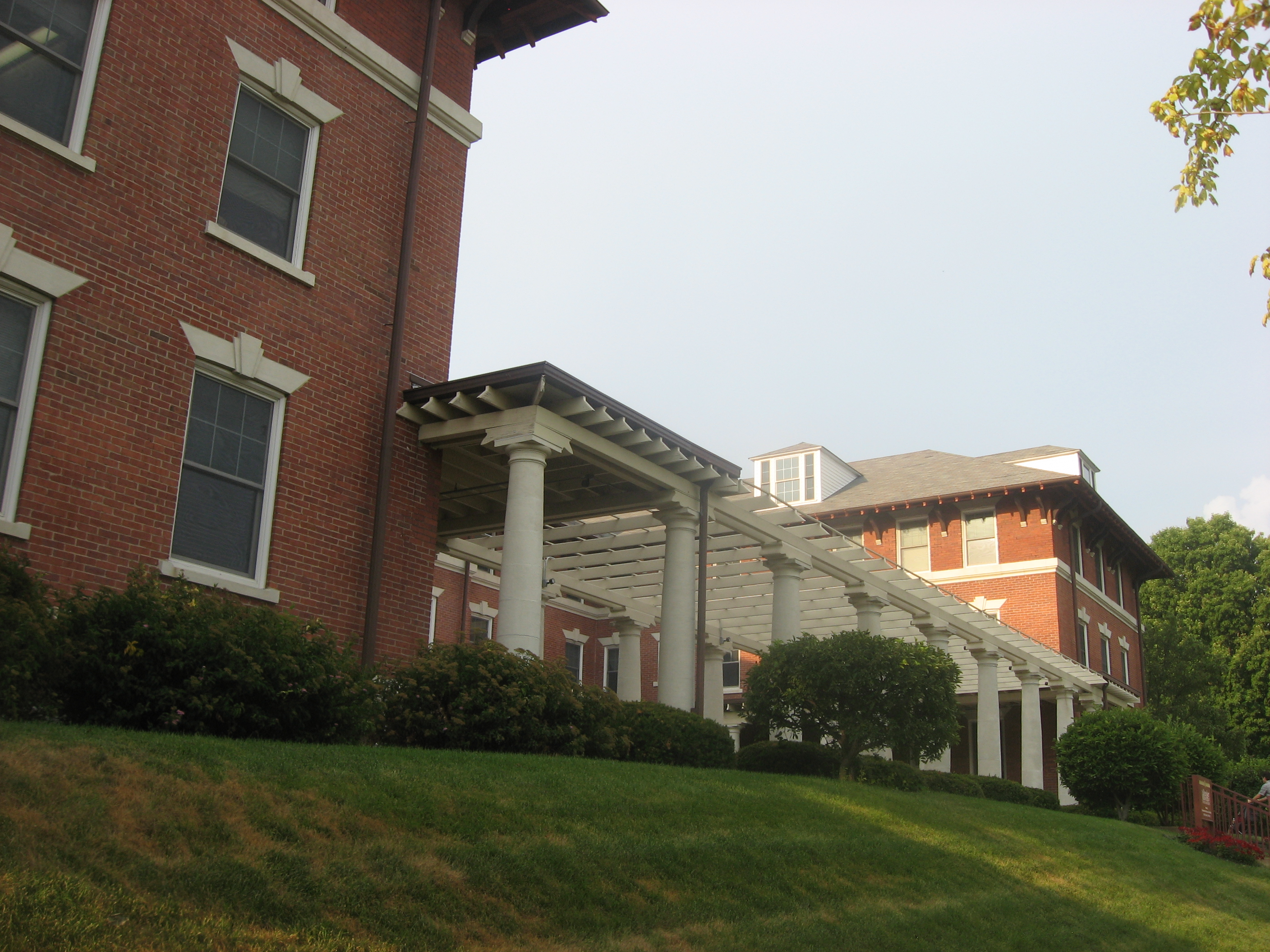
- The former Westminster Hotel

- Location within Indiana Location within the United States
- Location: Roughly bounded by Kings Hwy., Chestnut Ave., Twelfth St. and Park Ave., Winona Lake, Indiana
- Coordinates: 41°13′39″N 85°49′13″W
- Area: 48 acres (19 ha)
- Built: 1887
- Architectural style: Multiple
- NRHP reference No.: 93001411
- Added to NRHP: December 10, 1993

The Winona Lake Historic District is located along the Eastern shore of Winona Lake in Kosciusko County, Indiana. Historically, it is perhaps best known as a major center within the evangelical Bible Conference Movement during the first half of the twentieth century, though these gatherings were just one part of the larger history of the town of Winona Lake, an area which has been a Chautauqua site, resort spot, and conference center. It has been listed on the National Register of Historic Places in Kosciusko County, Indiana, since 1993.

== Chautauqua era origins ==
In 1888, J. F. Beyer purchased the area that surrounded the eastern side of what was then known as Eagle Lake. Beyer, along with his brothers, owned a wholesale dairy business in nearby Warsaw, Indiana, and were attracted to the 160-acre tract because of the many artesian springs that could provide a means of natural refrigeration.

The Beyer Brothers had additional plans for their property, however, and they founded Spring Fountain Park as a summer resort and Chautauqua site. The Park included such attractions as a race track, a modest roller coaster and cyclorama. A hotel was built, as well as an auditorium, which was used for programs and lectures. The first program included a keynote lecture from John Heyl Vincent, a co-founder of the original Chautauqua Institution in western New York.

Monument to Solomon Dickey along Park Avenue in Winona Lake, IN

The grounds changed ownership in 1894 when The Presbyterian Church of Indiana purchased the land, a transaction that was negotiated by Solomon C. Dickey. Dickey was then serving as the superintendent of Home Missions for the Indiana synod and would become an honored figure in Winona Lake. Dickey changed the name of the lake and established the Winona Assembly and Summer School in 1895. Although Chautauqua sites often included religious elements, Dickey was intent on bringing a stronger religious feel to the Winona programs and Bible conferences were begun immediately in 1896. Several notable persons held the position of president of the "Assembly," including H. J. Heinz and John Studebaker. Well known evangelists including J. Wilbur Chapman and William Biederwolf served as heads of the Bible conferences. Many performers and lecturers included Winona Lake in their Chautauqua "circuits," including Benjamin Harrison, William Jennings Bryan, Admiral Richard Byrd, Glenn Curtiss, Helen Keller, Will Rogers, James Whitcomb Riley, and Jane Addams among others. In 1911, the sensational evangelist Billy Sunday moved his family to Winona Lake, building an Arts and Crafts bungalow that has been preserved as the Billy Sunday Home Museum. Sunday's song leader, Homer Rodeheaver, soon relocated to Winona Lake as well. Numerous small summer schools were also established.

== Bible conference hub ==
During its Chautauqua height around 1910, crowds averaged 250,000 annually but by 1915, attendance was in decline. As the fuller Chautauqua-type programming declined, the Bible and prophecy conferences remained strong and became the hall-mark of Winona Lake. These gatherings also reflected a turn toward fundamentalism and dispensational premillennialism, though Winona Lake remained a central hub for a wide variety of evangelical leaders and activities. Youth for Christ, for example, was founded in Winona Lake in 1944 and Billy Graham spoke in the Billy Sunday Tabernacle in 1949. Graham and other Youth for Christ leaders held an all-night prayer vigil in the Westminster Hotel shortly before Graham's Los Angeles crusade and this is remembered by Winona Lake locals as something that helped launch Graham's career. By the 1960s, the "Assembly" had had several rounds of financial pressures and even the Bible Conferences were dwindling. In 1968, the grounds were purchased by Grace College and Theological Seminary and the school also assumed the assembly's heavy debts.

== Community renaissance ==
During the 1980s, as the older buildings and facilities continued to decline, the historic district became known for its dilapidated condition. The town experienced a renaissance in 2000, however, when local business leaders invested the heavy resources needed to create The Village at Winona and other recreational and local initiatives. The effort included the restoration of historic buildings, the creation of small shops along the canal, cultural events, formation of the Reneker Museum of Winona History (Now The Winona History Center) and the promotion of outdoor leisure and recreation. Although these efforts took place between 1998 and 2000, members of the Winona Historical Society had been raising awareness and taking small steps since at least 1990.

== Remaining historic buildings ==
- The Winona Hotel (originally called Eagle Lake Hotel)
- Westminster Hall (Formerly known as the Presbyterian Building, The Westminster Hotel and the International Friendship House)
- Mount Memorial (Originally called the Free Methodist Publishing House)
- Billy Sunday Home
- The Franconia (Home)
- The Administration Building
- The Beyer Home
- Killarney Castle (Solomon Dickey's home)
- The Railroad Power Station
- Church of the Good Shepherd
- Winona Lake Free Methodist Church
- Swiss Terrace Homes (The Geneva, Interlaken)

== See also ==
- Chinworth Bridge
- Kosciusko County Jail
- Warsaw Courthouse Square Historic District
