= Kelly J. Manahan =

Kelly J. Manahan is an American gynecologist who is the current Chair of Obstetrics and Gynecology at the University of Toledo College of Medicine and Life Sciences in Toledo, Ohio.

She is the fifth Chair of Obstetrics and Gynecology for The University of Toledo which is the former Medical College of Ohio. She is the first female to hold this position. She was appointed to this position after a nationwide search in 2011.

== Education ==
She holds a bachelor's degree from Grace College Winona Lake, Indiana. She completed medical School training at Indiana University School of Medicine Indianapolis, Indiana in 1994. She did her graduate training in Obstetrics and Gynecology at the Medical College of Ohio finishing in 1994. Her post-graduate work in gynecologic oncology was at The University of Michigan in Ann Arbor, Michigan.

She is a diplomate of the American Board of Obstetrics and Gynecology in both General Ob/Gyn and Gynecologic Oncology.

== Research ==
She has published dozens of peer-reviewed articles in the field of gynecologic oncology. Her research covers the depth and breadth of women's health care with focus on women's cancers.

Some of the more significant contributions include work on avoiding ultra-radical surgery for advanced vulvar cancer, using evidence-based medicine to choose chemotherapy for women with ovarian cancer, and understanding the heterogeneity of ovarian cancer.

== Personal life ==
She is married with three step-children. Her husband, John P. Geisler, is also a gynecologic oncologist.

Her father is Ronald E. Manahan, former president of Grace College and Theological Seminary in Winona Lake, Indiana.
