= Continental Singers discography =

Christian music organization

The following audio recordings were produced by organizations associated with Continental Singers, Inc in the United States or its successor, the Continental Global Foundation.

== List of Audio Recordings ==
| Release year | Album title | Group(s) credited | Primary music-producing Continentals organization | Format | Record label |
|---|---|---|---|---|---|
| 1963 | Sing a Happy Song | Cam Floria and the Continentals | Continental Singers, Inc (US) (Note: The music production of this album predates the incorporation of Continental Singers, Inc in 1967.) | LP | Word Records |
| 1964 | Sing a Song Along | Cam Floria and the Continentals | Continental Singers, Inc (US) | LP | Word Records |
| 1965 | Life is a Symphony | Cam Floria and the Continentals | Continental Singers, Inc (US) | LP | Word Records |
| 1967 | There's More to Life... | The Continental Singers and Orchestra | Continental Singers, Inc (US) | LP | Word Records |
| 1969 | Live! In Concert...Tour Album | The Continental Singers and Orchestra | Continental Singers, Inc (US) | LP | Light Records |
| 1970 | Soul | The Continental Singers | Continental Singers, Inc (US) | LP | Light Records |
| 1972 | It's Getting Late (for the Great Planet Earth): A Folk Rock Oratorio | The Continentals; New Hope; Jeremiah People | Continental Singers, Inc (US) | LP | Light Records |
| 1972 | It's Getting Late (for the Great Planet Earth): A Folk Rock Oratorio | The Continentals; New Hope; Jeremiah People | Continental Singers, Inc (US) | 8-Track | Light Records |
| 1972 | Look Inside | The Continentals | Continental Singers, Inc (US) | LP | Light Records (US) |
| 1972 | Look Inside | The Continentals | Continental Singers, Inc (US) | LP | Myrrh Records (UK) |
| 1973 | The Apostle | The Continental Singers; New Hope; Jeremiah People | Continental Singers, Inc (US) | LP | Light Records |
| 1974 | Share: A Musical that Shares the Gospel | The Continental Singers; New Hope; Jeremiah People | Continental Singers, Inc (US) | LP | Light Records |
| 1975 | I Believe in Heaven | The Cam Floria Continental Voices | Continental Singers, Inc (US) | LP | Light Records |
| 1976 | Majesty and Glory | The Cam Floria Continental Voices | Continental Singers, Inc (US) | LP | Light Records |
| 1977 | Come Bless the Lord: Over Sixty Scripture Praise Songs | Cam Floria's Continentals | Continental Singers, Inc (US) | LP | Christian Artists Records (US) |
| 1977 | Come Bless the Lord: Over Sixty Scripture Praise Songs | Cam Floria's Continentals | Continental Singers, Inc (US) | LP | New Life Records (Canada) |
| 1977 | Come Bless the Lord: Over Sixty Scripture Praise Songs | Cam Floria's Continentals | Continental Singers, Inc (US) | Cassette | New Life Records (Canada) |
| 1978 | Sing It with Love | The Continentals | Continental Singers, Inc (US) | LP | New Life Records |
| 1978 | Sing It with Love | The Continentals | Continental Singers, Inc (US) | Cassette | New Life Records |
| 1979 | Come Praise and Bless the Lord: Fifty-Four Scripture Praise Songs | Cam Floria's Continentals | Continental Singers, Inc (US) | LP | New Life Records |
| 1979 | Come Praise and Bless the Lord: Fifty-Four Scripture Praise Songs | Cam Floria's Continentals | Continental Singers, Inc (US) | Cassette | New Life Records |
| 1980 | ...And There Was Light: A Youth Musical | The Continental Singers and Orchestra | Continental Singers, Inc (US) | LP | New Life Records |
| 1980 | Praise the Lord | The Continental Orchestra | (Note: The information cannot be located from a quality reference source (e.g., image of information printed on the album or case).) | | |
| 1981 | Come Trust the Lord | The Continental Singers and Orchestra | Continental Singers, Inc (US) | LP | Christian Artists Records (US) |
| 1981 | Come Trust the Lord | The Continental Singers and Orchestra | Continental Singers, Inc (US) | LP | New Life Records (UK) |
| 1981 | Come Trust the Lord | The Continental Singers and Orchestra | Continental Singers, Inc (US) | Cassette | Christian Artists Records (US) |
| 1981 | The Sky Shall Unfold | The Cam Floria Voices and Brass | Continental Singers, Inc (US) | LP | Christian Artists Records (UK) |
| 1981 | The Sky Shall Unfold | The Cam Floria Voices and Brass | Continental Singers, Inc (US) | LP | New Life Records (US) |
| 1981 | The Sky Shall Unfold | The Cam Floria Voices and Brass | Continental Singers, Inc (US) | Cassette | |
| 1982 | Continental Country | Cam Floria's Continentals | Continental Singers, Inc (US) | LP | Christian Artists Records |
| 1982 | Continental Country | Cam Floria's Continentals | Continental Singers, Inc (US) | Cassette | Christian Artists Records |
| 1983 | Come Love the Lord: 64 Praise Songs of Love | Cam Floria's Continentals | Continental Singers, Inc (US) | LP | Christian Artists Records |
| 1983 | Come Love the Lord: 64 Praise Songs of Love | Cam Floria's Continentals | Continental Singers, Inc (US) | Cassette | Christian Artists Records |
| 1983 | Dreamer: What Really Happened to Joseph | Cam Floria's Continentals | Continental Singers, Inc (US) | LP | Christian Artists Records |
| 1983 | Dreamer: What Really Happened to Joseph | Cam Floria's Continentals | Continental Singers, Inc (US) | CD | Christian Artists Records |
| 1983 | The Continental Orchestra | The Continental Orchestra | | | |
| 1984 | How Majestic is Your Name | The Continental Orchestra | | | |
| 1984 | O Come All Ye Faithful: An International Christmas | The Continental Singers | Continental Singers, Inc (US) | LP | Christian Artists Records |
| 1984 | O Come All Ye Faithful: An International Christmas | The Continental Singers | Continental Singers, Inc (US) | Cassette | Christian Artists Records |
| 1985 | Now or Never (single) | The Continental Singers | Continental Singers, Inc (US) | Vinyl, 7" | Christian Artists Records |
| 1985 | Together We Will Stand | The Continental Singers and Orchestra | Continental Singers, Inc (US) | LP | Christian Artists Records |
| 1985 | Together We Will Stand | The Continental Singers and Orchestra | Continental Singers, Inc (US) | Cassette | Christian Artists Records |
| 1985 | Together We Will Stand | The Continental Singers and Orchestra | Continental Singers, Inc (US) | CD | Christian Artists Records |
| 1986 | All Over the World: Let Them See Jesus | The Continental Singers and Orchestra | Continental Singers, Inc (US) | LP | Emerald Productions |
| 1986 | All Over the World: Let Them See Jesus | The Continental Singers and Orchestra | Continental Singers, Inc (US) | Cassette | Emerald Productions |
| 1986 | All Over the World | The Continentals | Continental Singers, Inc (US) | CD | CA Music - USA for Europe |
| 1987 | Elijah: A Youth Musical | The Continental Singers | Continental Singers, Inc (US) | LP | Christian Artists Records |
| 1987 | Elijah: A Youth Musical | The Continental Singers | Continental Singers, Inc (US) | Cassette | Christian Artists Records |
| 1988 | The Reason We Sing | The Continentals | Continental Singers, Inc (US) | LP | Continental Recordings (UK) |
| 1988 | The Reason We Sing | The Continentals | Continental Singers, Inc (US) | Cassette | Continental Recordings (UK) |
| 1988 | The Reason We Sing | The Continentals | Continental Singers, Inc (US) | CD | Continental Recordings (UK) |
| | 집 노래하는 이유 (The Reason We Sing) | 한국-컨티넨탈-싱어즈 (The Korean Continentals) | 한국-컨티넨탈-싱어즈 (The Korean Continentals) | | |
| 1989 | Come Bless the Lord with Singing | The Continentals | Continental Singers, Inc (US) | Cassette | Christian Artists Records |
| 1989 | Come Bless the Lord with Singing | The Continentals | Continental Singers, Inc (US) | CD | Christian Artists Records |
| 1989 | A Nuestro Dios y Rey | The Latin Continental Singers | Latin Continental Singers (Note: The music production of this album predates the incorporation of Latin Continental Singers, Inc in Puerto Rico in 2006.) | Digital (Note: As of May 29, 2020, the only references identified relate to a digitally delivered album. However, the album's date predates digital delivery of music.) | Latin Continental Singers |
| 1990 | Alza la Luz | The Latin Continental Singers | Latin Continental Singers | Digital | Latin Continental Singers |
| 1990 | Hold Up the Light | The Continental Singers | Continental Singers, Inc (US) | LP | Word Records (Europe and UK) |
| 1990 | Hold Up the Light | The Continental Singers | Continental Singers, Inc (US) | Cassette | Continental Sound Music (Europe) |
| 1990 | Hold Up the Light | The Continental Singers | Continental Singers, Inc (US) | Cassette | Word Records (Europe and UK) |
| 1990 | Hold Up the Light | The Continental Singers | Continental Singers, Inc (US) | CD | Christian Artists Records (US) |
| 1990 | Hold Up the Light | The Continental Singers | Continental Singers, Inc (US) | CD | Word Records (Europe and UK) |
| 1991 | Set Them Free | The Continental Singers | Continental Singers, Inc (US) | Cassette | Christian Artists Records |
| 1991 | Set Them Free | The Continental Singers | Continental Singers, Inc (US) | CD | Christian Artists Records |
| 1992 | Libre D'Aimer | Les Continental Singers Francophones | Continental Ministries Europe | CD | Continental Sound Music |
| 1992 | Yes! Let's Go | The Continental Singers | Continental Singers, Inc (US) | Cassette | Spark Music |
| 1992 | Yes! Let's Go | The Continentals | Continental Singers, Inc (US) | CD | Christian Artists Records |
| 1993 | The Best of Continental Orchestra and Continental Brass | The Continental Orchestra; The Continental Brass | Continental Singers, Inc (US) | CD | Christian Artists Records |
| 1993 | Choose Right | The Young Continentals | Continental Singers, Inc (US) | Cassette | Christian Artists Records |
| 1993 | Choose Right | The Young Continentals | Continental Singers, Inc (US) | CD | Christian Artists Records |
| 1993 | Choose Right | The Young Continentals | Continental Ministries Europe | CD | Continental Sound Music |
| 1993 | Leve Toi | Les Continental Singers Francophones | Continental Ministries Europe | CD | Continental Sound Music |
| 1993 | O Come All Ye Faithful: An International Christmas | The Continental Singers and Orchestra | Continental Singers, Inc (US) | CD | Continental Sound Music |
| 1993 | Stand Up, Move Out! | The Continentals | Continental Singers, Inc (US) | Cassette | Christian Artists Records |
| 1993 | Stand Up, Move Out! | The Continentals | Continental Singers, Inc (US) | CD | Christian Artists Records |
| 1994 | Dreamer: The Epoch Story of Joseph | The Continentals | Continental Singers, Inc (US) | Cassette | Christian Artists Records |
| 1994 | Dreamer: The Epoch Story of Joseph | The Continentals | Continental Singers, Inc (US) | CD | Christian Artists Records |
| 1994 | Get a Life | The Young Continentals | Continental Singers, Inc (US) | Cassette | Christian Artists Records |
| 1994 | Get a Life | The Young Continentals | Continental Singers, Inc (US) | CD | Christian Artists Records |
| 1994 | Le Reveur: La Vie de Joseph | Les Continental Singers Francophones | Continental Ministries Europe | CD | Continental Sound Music |
| 1995 | Celebrate: The Best of the Continentals, Volume III | The Continentals | Continental Singers, Inc (US) | Cassette | Christian Artists Records |
| 1995 | Celebrate: The Best of the Continentals, Volume III | The Continentals | Continental Singers, Inc (US) | CD | Christian Artists Records |
| 1995 | Faith in Motion | The Continentals | Continental Singers, Inc (US) | Cassette | Christian Artists Records |
| 1995 | Faith in Motion | The Continentals | Continental Singers, Inc (US) | CD | Christian Artists Records |
| 1996 | All Over the World: Let Them See Jesus | The Continentals | Continental Singers, Inc (US) | CD | Continental Sound Music |
| 1996 | Frei | The Continentals | Continental Ministries Europe | CD | Continental Sound Music |
| 1996 | Parfums de Vie | Les Continental Singers Francophones | Continental Ministries Europe | CD | Continental Sound Music |
| 1997 | Ich Will dir Folgen | The Continentals | Continental Ministries Europe | CD | Continental Sound Music |
| 1997 | Miesto pre Všetkých | The Continental Singers | Continental Ministries Slovakia | CD | |
| 1997 | Reachin' Out | The Continentals | | Cassette | |
| 1997 | Reachin' Out | The Continentals | Continental Singers, Inc (US) | CD | Spark Music |
| 1997 | Vivre ma Foi | Les Continentals Francophones | Continental Ministries Europe | CD | Continental Sound Music |
| 1997 | 집네 믿음을 보이라 (Faith in Motion) | 한국-컨티넨탈-싱어즈 (The Korean Continentals) | 한국-컨티넨탈-싱어즈 (The Korean Continentals) | Cassette | |
| 1997 | 집네 믿음을 보이라 (Faith in Motion) | 한국-컨티넨탈-싱어즈 (The Korean Continentals) | 한국-컨티넨탈-싱어즈 (The Korean Continentals) | CD | |
| 1998 | David: A Man After God's Own Heart | Cam Floria | Continental Singers, Inc (US) | CD | Christian Artists Records |
| 1998 | Give 'em Hope | The Young Continentals | Continental Singers, Inc (US) | CD | Spark Music |
| 1998 | Hope for Europe and Beyond | The Continentals | Continental Ministries Europe | CD | Continental Sound Music |
| 1998 | J'ai Trouvé la Vie | The Young Continentals | Continental Ministries Europe | CD | Continental Sound Music |
| 1998 | Jetzt Oder Nie | The Young Continentals | Continental Ministries Europe | CD | Continental Sound Music |
| 1998 | Nádej | The Continental Singers | Continental Ministries Slovakia | CD | |
| 1998 | Praise His Name | The Continental Orchestra | Continental Singers, Inc (US) | CD | |
| 1998 | Songs for Kids | Continental Kids | Continental Ministries Europe | CD | Continental Sound Music |
| 1998 | 집 꿈의 사람 요셉 (Dreamer) | 한국-컨티넨탈-싱어즈 (The Korean Continentals) | 한국-컨티넨탈-싱어즈 (The Korean Continentals) | CD | |
| 1998 | 빛을 비춰라 (Light Your World) | 한국-컨티넨탈-싱어즈 (The Korean Continentals) | 한국-컨티넨탈-싱어즈 (The Korean Continentals) | Cassette | |
| 1998 | 빛을 비춰라 (Light Your World) | 한국-컨티넨탈-싱어즈 (The Korean Continentals) | 한국-컨티넨탈-싱어즈 (The Korean Continentals) | CD | |
| 1999 | Liebe für die Welt | The Continentals | Continental Ministries Europe | CD | Continental Sound Music |
| 1999 | Mission of Love | The Continentals | Continental Singers, Inc (US) | Cassette | Christian Artists Records |
| 1999 | Mission of Love | The Continentals | Continental Singers, Inc (US) | CD | Christian Artists Records |
| 1999 | Op Reis met de Kids Club Company | Continental Kids Club | Continental Ministries Europe | CD | Continental Sound Music |
| 1999 | 소망을-품으라 (Give 'em Hope) | 한국-컨티넨탈-싱어즈 (The Korean Continentals) | 한국-컨티넨탈-싱어즈 (The Korean Continentals) | Digital | 한국-컨티넨탈-싱어즈 (The Korean Continentals) |
| 2000 | 150 Favourites from Around the World (seven-disc set) | The Continentals; The Young Continentals; New Hope | Continental Singers, Inc (US) | CD | Continental Sound Music |
| 2000 | Auf der Reise | Continental Kids | Continental Ministries Europe | CD | Continental Sound Music |
| 2000 | Bezeuge die Wahrheit | The Continentals | Continental Ministries Europe | CD | Continental Sound Music |
| 2000 | Bouwen Huis van Vriendschap | Continental Kids | Continental Ministries Europe | CD | Continental Sound Music |
| 2000 | The Gospel is True | The Young Continentals | Continental Ministries Europe | CD | Continental Sound Music |
| 2000 | Misia Lásky | The Continental Singers | Continental Ministries Slovakia | CD | |
| 2000 | Testify 2 Truth | The Continentals | Continental Singers, Inc (US) | CD | Christian Artists Records |
| 2000 | 사랑하라 (Mission of Love) | 한국-컨티넨탈-싱어즈 (The Korean Continentals) | 한국-컨티넨탈-싱어즈 (The Korean Continentals) | Digital | 한국-컨티넨탈-싱어즈 (The Korean Continentals) |
| 2000 | 진리를-외치라 (Testify to Truth) | 한국-컨티넨탈-싱어즈 (The Korean Continentals) | 한국-컨티넨탈-싱어즈 (The Korean Continentals) | Digital | 한국-컨티넨탈-싱어즈 (The Korean Continentals) |
| 2001 | Cesta Pravdy | The Continental Singers | Continental Ministries Slovakia | CD | |
| 2001 | Comori | Continental (Romania) | Continental Ministries Romania | Digital | Continental Ministries Romania |
| 2001 | The Continental Gospel Choir: The Continental Classics No. 2 | The Continentals | Continental Singers, Inc (US) | CD | Continental Sound Music |
| 2001 | Één Familie | Continental Kids | Continental Ministries Europe | CD | Continental Sound Music |
| 2001 | Geh'den Weg Nicht Allein: Lieder aus Der Stille - Leider für Unterwegs | The Continental Voices | Continental Ministries Europe | CD | Continental Sound Music |
| 2001 | The Grace Odyssey | The Continentals | Continental Ministries Europe | CD | Continental Sound Music |
| 2001 | Niet Alleen: Lederen voor Onderweg | The Continental Voices | Continental Ministries Europe | CD | Continental Art Centre |
| 2001 | Praise and Worship Classics | The Continentals | Continental Singers, Inc (US) | CD | Continental Sound Music |
| 2001 | Tu N'es Pass Seul: Chants de Méditation et d'Adoration | The Continental Voices | Continental Ministries Europe | CD | Continental Sound Music |
| 2001 | We Have Made a Choice | The Young Continentals | Continental Ministries Europe | CD | Continental Sound Music |
| 2001 | You Are Not Alone: Songs of Worship and Meditation | The Continental Voices | Continental Ministries Europe | CD | Continental Art Centre |
| 2001 | 은혜의-항해 (The Grace Odyssey) | 한국-컨티넨탈-싱어즈 (The Korean Continentals) | 한국-컨티넨탈-싱어즈 (The Korean Continentals) | Cassette | |
| 2001 | 은혜의-항해 (The Grace Odyssey) | 한국-컨티넨탈-싱어즈 (The Korean Continentals) | 한국-컨티넨탈-싱어즈 (The Korean Continentals) | CD | |
| 2001 | 집 찬양 그 영광을 (Make His Praise Glorious) | 한국-컨티넨탈-싱어즈 (The Korean Continentals) | 한국-컨티넨탈-싱어즈 (The Korean Continentals) | Cassette | |
| 2001 | 집 찬양 그 영광을 (Make His Praise Glorious) | 한국-컨티넨탈-싱어즈 (The Korean Continentals) | 한국-컨티넨탈-싱어즈 (The Korean Continentals) | CD | |
| 2002 | Live at de Doelen | The Continentals; The Young Continentals Continental Kids | Continental Ministries Europe | CD | Continental Sound Music |
| 2002 | Live It Up | The Continentals | Continental Singers, Inc (US) | CD | Christian Artists Records |
| 2002 | Mega Stories | Continental Kids | Continental Ministries Europe | CD | Continental Sound Music |
| 2002 | Odysea Milosti | The Continental Singers | Continental Ministries Slovakia | CD | |
| 2002 | Skutočný Priatel' | Continental Kids | Continental Ministries Slovakia | CD | |
| 2003 | Extreme | The Young Continentals | Continental Singers, Inc (US) | CD | Christian Artists Records |
| 2003 | Înălțimi de Nevisat | Continental (Romania) | Continental Ministries Romania | Digital | Continental Ministries Romania |
| 2003 | Latin Continental Singers | The Latin Continental Singers | Latin Continental Singers | Digital | Latin Continental Singers |
| 2003 | Power | Continental Kids | Continental Ministries Europe | CD | Continental Sound Music |
| 2003 | The Reason of Christmas | The Continentals | Continental Singers, Inc (US) | CD | Continental Sound Music |
| 2003 | Vel'ké Príbehy | Continental Kids | Continental Ministries Slovakia | CD | |
| 2003 | XP3 Extreme Power: Father, Son, Holy Spirit | The Continentals | Continental Singers, Inc (US) | CD | Christian Artists Records |
| 2003 | Ži Naplno! | The Young Continentals | Continental Ministries Slovakia | CD | |
| 2003 | 나는-외치리라 (Live It Up) | 한국-컨티넨탈-싱어즈 (The Korean Continentals) | 한국-컨티넨탈-싱어즈 (The Korean Continentals) | Digital | 한국-컨티넨탈-싱어즈 (The Korean Continentals) |
| 2004 | Airborne: Reaching for a Higher Purpose | The Continentals | Continental Ministries Europe | CD | Continental Sound Music |
| 2004 | Blessed are the Merciful: The 35 Most Requested Songs | The Continentals | Continental Singers, Inc (US) | CD | (Note: The album leaves the record label unspecified. The album was distributed by Continental Ministries Europe.) |
| 2004 | Goal!!! Jezus is het Doel | Continental Kids | Continental Ministries Europe | CD | Continental Sound Music |
| 2004 | Higher Purpose | The Young Continentals | Continental Ministries Europe | CD | Continental Sound Music |
| 2004 | To je Sila | Continental Kids | Continental Ministries Slovakia | CD | |
| 2004 | Zbav Ma Pút | The Continental Singers | Continental Ministries Slovakia | CD | |
| 2004 | 권능 (Extreme Power 3) | 한국-컨티넨탈-싱어즈 (The Korean Continentals) | 한국-컨티넨탈-싱어즈 (The Korean Continentals) | Digital | 한국-컨티넨탈-싱어즈 (The Korean Continentals) |
| 2005 | Afspraak is Afspraak | Continental Kids | Continental Ministries Europe | CD | Continental Sound Music |
| 2005 | Committed | The Continentals | Continental Ministries Europe | CD | Continental Sound Music |
| 2005 | Committed | The Young Continentals | Continental Ministries Europe | CD | Continental Sound Music |
| 2005 | Lângă Inima Lui | Continental (Romania) | Continental Ministries Romania | Digital | Continental Ministries Romania |
| 2005 | Mica Mea Iubire | Continental Kids | Continental Ministries Romania | Digital | Continental Ministries Romania |
| 2005 | Vyšší Zámer | The Continental Singers | Continental Ministries Slovakia | CD | |
| 2005 | 비상: 더높은 뜻을 향해 (Airborne: Reaching for a Higher Purpose) | 한국-컨티넨탈-싱어즈 (The Korean Continentals) | 한국-컨티넨탈-싱어즈 (The Korean Continentals) | Digital | 한국-컨티넨탈-싱어즈 (The Korean Continentals) |
| 2005 | 부르심에-헌신하라 (Committed to the Call) | 한국-컨티넨탈-싱어즈 (The Korean Continentals) | 한국-컨티넨탈-싱어즈 (The Korean Continentals) | Digital | 한국-컨티넨탈-싱어즈 (The Korean Continentals) |
| 2006 | Check Check Dubbel Check | Continental Kids | Continental Ministries Europe | CD | Continental Sound Music |
| 2006 | Dare 2 Check | The Young Continentals | Continental Ministries Europe | CD | Continental Sound Music |
| 2006 | Reality Check | The Continentals | Continental Singers, Inc (US) | CD | Christian Artists Records |
| 2007 | All Over the World | The Continental Singers | Continental Singers, Inc (US) | CD | Christian Artists Records |
| 2007 | Ik Ben Hier | Continental Kids | Continental Ministries Europe | CD | Continental Sound Music |
| 2007 | Lecții de Viață | Continental Kids | Continental Ministries Romania | Digital | Continental Ministries Romania |
| 2007 | Serious | The Young Continentals | Continental Ministries Europe | CD | Continental Sound Music |
| 2007 | 현실점검 (Reality Check) | 한국-컨티넨탈-싱어즈 (The Korean Continentals) | 한국-컨티넨탈-싱어즈 (The Korean Continentals) | Digital | 한국-컨티넨탈-싱어즈 (The Korean Continentals) |
| 2008 | The Best Of | Continental (Romania) | Continental Ministries Romania | CD | |
| 2008 | Go On | The Young Continentals | Continental Ministries Europe | CD | Continental Sound Music |
| 2008 | New Beginnings | The Continentals | Continental Ministries Europe | CD | Continental Sound Music |
| 2008 | Schatten | Continental Kids | Continental Ministries Europe | CD | Continental Sound Music |
| 2008 | 우리는-돌아가야-하네 (Welcome Home) | 한국-컨티넨탈-싱어즈 (The Korean Continentals) | 한국-컨티넨탈-싱어즈 (The Korean Continentals) | Digital | 한국-컨티넨탈-싱어즈 (The Korean Continentals) |
| 2009 | Casa Prieteniei | Continental (Romania) | Continental Ministries Romania | Digital | Continental Ministries Romania |
| 2009 | Conforme a Su Corazón | The Latin Continental Singers | Latin Continental Singers, Inc | Digital | Latin Continental Singers |
| 2009 | De Dragul Chemării Lui | Continental (Romania) | Continental Ministries Romania | Digital | Continental Ministries Romania |
| 2009 | Hope = Salvation | The Continentals | Continental Ministries Europe | CD | Continental Sound Music |
| 2009 | Party Time | Continental Kids | Continental Ministries Europe | CD | Continental Sound Music |
| 2009 | S.O.S. | The Young Continentals | Continental Ministries Europe | CD | Continental Sound Music |
| 2010 | Up with Faith | The Young Continentals | Continental Ministries Europe | CD | Continental Sound Music |
| 2010 | Voices of Faith | The Continentals | Continental Ministries Europe | CD | Continental Sound Music |
| 2010 | Zeker Weten | Continental Kids | Continental Ministries Europe | CD | Continental Sound Music |
| 2011 | By Your Side | The Young Continentals | Continental Ministries Europe | CD | Continental Sound Music |
| 2011 | Comoara | Continental Kids | Continental Ministries Romania | CD | Continental Ministries Romania |
| 2011 | Comoara | Continental Kids | Continental Ministries Romania | Digital | Continental Ministries Romania |
| 2001 | Spoorzoehen | Continental Kids | Continental Ministries Europe | CD | Continental Sound Music |
| 2011 | Trails of Trust: Voices of Faith 2 | The Continentals | Continental Ministries Europe | CD | Continental Sound Music |
| 2011 | 주의-날개-아래 (In the Shadow of Thy Wings) | 한국-컨티넨탈-싱어즈 (The Korean Continentals) | 한국-컨티넨탈-싱어즈 (The Korean Continentals) | Digital | 한국-컨티넨탈-싱어즈 (The Korean Continentals) |
| 2012 | All Power | The Young Continentals | Continental Ministries Europe | CD | Continental Sound Music |
| 2012 | ...And There Was Light: A Youth Musical | The Continental Singers and Orchestra | Continental Singers, Inc (US) | CD | Continental Sound Music |
| 2012 | The Apostle | The Continental Singers; New Hope; Jeremiah People | Continental Singers, Inc (US) | CD | Continental Sound Music |
| 2012 | Come Bless the Lord: Over Sixty Scripture Praise Songs | The Continentals | Continental Singers, Inc (US) | CD | Continental Sound Music |
| 2012 | Come Love the Lord | Cam Floria's Continentals | Continental Singers, Inc (US) | CD | Continental Sound Music |
| 2012 | Come Praise and Bless the Lord: Fifty-Four Scripture Praise Songs | Cam Floria's Continentals | Continental Singers, Inc (US) | CD | Continental Sound Music |
| 2012 | Come Trust the Lord | The Continental Singers and Orchestra | Continental Singers, Inc (US) | CD | Continental Sound Music |
| 2012 | Continental Country | Cam Floria's Continentals | Continental Singers, Inc (US) | CD | Continental Sound Music |
| | Cu Bratele Deschise | Continental (Romania) | Continental Ministries Romania | CD | |
| 2012 | Hacia el Cielo | The Latin Continental Singers | Latin Continental Singers, Inc | Digital | Latin Continental Singers |
| 2012 | I Believe in Heaven | The Cam Floria Continental Voices | Continental Singers, Inc (US) | CD | Continental Sound Music |
| 2012 | It's Getting Late (for the Great Planet Earth): A Folk Rock Oratorio | The Continental Singers; New Hope; Jeremiah People | Continental Singers, Inc (US) | CD | Continental Sound Music |
| 2012 | Life is a Symphony | The Continentals | Continental Singers, Inc (US) | CD | Continental Sound Music |
| 2012 | Live! In Concert...Tour Album | The Continental Singers and Orchestra | Continental Singers, Inc (US) | CD | Continental Sound Music |
| 2012 | Look Inside | The Continental Singers and Orchestra | Continental Singers, Inc (US) | CD | Continental Sound Music |
| 2012 | Majesty and Glory | The Cam Floria Continental Voices | Continental Singers, Inc (US) | CD | Continental Sound Music |
| 2012 | Mercy Matters | The Continentals | Continental Ministries Europe | CD | Continental Sound Music |
| 2012 | Share: A Musical that Shares the Gospel | The Continental Singers; New Hope; Jeremiah People | Continental Singers, Inc (US) | CD | Continental Sound Music |
| 2012 | Sing a Happy Song | The Continentals | Continental Singers, Inc (US) | CD | Continental Sound Music |
| 2012 | Sing a Song Along | The Continentals | Continental Singers, Inc (US) | CD | Continental Sound Music |
| 2012 | Sing It with Love | The Continentals | Continental Singers, Inc (US) | CD | Continental Sound Music |
| 2012 | The Sky Shall Unfold | The Cam Floria Voices and Brass | Continental Singers, Inc (US) | CD | Continental Sound Music |
| 2012 | Soul | The Continentals | Continental Singers, Inc (US) | CD | Continental Sound Music |
| 2012 | Speciale Aanbieding | Continental Kids | Continental Ministries Europe | CD | Continental Sound Music |
| 2012 | There's More to Life | The Continental Singers and Orchestra | Continental Singers, Inc (US) | CD | Continental Sound Music |
| 2013 | Acts 29 | The Young Continentals | Continental Ministries Europe | CD | Continental Sound Music |
| 2013 | Când el Îţi Schimbâ Povestea | Continental (Romania) | Continental Ministries Romania | CD | |
| 2013 | Când el Îţi Schimbâ Povestea | Continental (Romania) | Continental Ministries Romania | Digital | Continental Ministries Romania |
| 2013 | Doen! | Continental Kids | Continental Ministries Europe | CD | Continental Sound Music |
| 2013 | Up To You | The Continentals | Continental Ministries Europe | CD | Continental Sound Music |
| 2014 | Aproape de Mine | Continental (Romania) | Continental Ministries Romania | CD | |
| 2014 | Aproape de Mine | Continental (Romania) | Continental Ministries Romania | Digital | Continental Ministries Romania |
| 2014 | Ga in het licht | Continental Kids | Continental Ministries Europe | CD | Continental Sound Music |
| 2014 | Hallo! Contact! | Continental Kids | Continental Ministries Europe | CD | Continental Sound Music |
| 2014 | Number One | Continental Kids | Continental Ministries Romania | CD | Continental Ministries Romania |
| 2014 | Number One | Continental Kids | Continental Ministries Romania | Digital | Continental Ministries Romania |
| 2014 | Re:Connection | The Young Continentals | Continental Ministries Europe | CD | Continental Sound Music |
| 2015 | The Best of the Continental Kids | Continental Kids | Continental Ministries Romania | CD | |
| 2015 | A Fascinating Journey | The Young Continentals | Continental Ministries Europe | CD | Continental Sound Music |
| 2015 | GPS | Continental Kids | Continental Ministries Slovakia | CD | |
| 2015 | Op Weg met die Grote God is Licht en Leven | Continental Kids | Continental Ministries Europe | CD | Continental Sound Music |
| 2015 | Worship the Great I Am | The Continentals | Continental Ministries Europe | CD | Continental Sound Music |
| 2016 | 1,2,3 La Perete Stop | Continental (Romania) | Continental Ministries Romania | CD | |
| 2016 | Ce Sunt Cu Adevarat | Continental (Romania) | Continental Ministries Romania | CD | |
| 2016 | Ce Sunt Cu Adevarat | Continental (Romania) | Continental Ministries Romania | Digital | Continental Ministries Romania |
| 2016 | 회복-새로운-능력 (Reconnection) | 한국-컨티넨탈-싱어즈 (The Korean Continentals) | 한국-컨티넨탈-싱어즈 (The Korean Continentals) | Digital | 한국-컨티넨탈-싱어즈 (The Korean Continentals) |
| 2017 | 20 Rokov s Continentals | The Continental Singers; The Young Continentals; Continental Kids | Continental Ministries Slovakia | CD | |
| 2017 | A Cappella | The Continentals | Continental Ministries Europe | CD | Continental Sound Music |
| 2017 | Acasa | Continental (Romania) | Continental Ministries Romania | CD | |
| 2017 | Acasa | Continental (Romania) | Continental Ministries Romania | Digital | Continental Ministries Romania |
| 2018 | De Dragul Chemarii Lui | Continental (Romania) | Continental Ministries Romania | CD | |
| 2018 | De Dragul Chemarii Lui | Continental (Romania) | Continental Ministries Romania | Digital | Continental Ministries Romania |
| 2018 | Special | Continental Kids | Continental Ministries Romania | Digital | Continental Ministries Romania |
| 2020 | The Glory of Easter | The Continentals | Continental Ministries Europe | CD | Continental Sound Music |
| 2020 | Încă un Pas | Continental (Romania) | Continental Ministries Romania | Digital | Continental Ministries Romania |
| 2020 | Standing On The Rock | The Continentals | Continental Ministries Europe | CD | Continental Sound Music |
| 2023 | Jesus Victor | The Continentals | Continental Ministries Europe | CD | Continental Sound Music |
