= Brethren Missionary Herald Company =

- Parent company: Charis Fellowship
- Founded: 1940; 86 years ago
- Country of origin: United States
- Headquarters location: Winona Lake, Indiana
- Publication types: Books, Magazines
- Nonfiction topics: Theology, Christian living
- Official website: bmhbooks.com

The Brethren Missionary Herald Company, also known as BMH Books, began in 1940 and is the publishing company serving the 1,300 churches and approximately 3/4 of a million persons in the Charis Fellowship.

Its main activities include:

- the publication of a denominational news publication,
- the supplying of church resources through retail outlets, which are all now either sold or closed,
- the publishing of books, often in 13-chapter formats and used widely by Grace Brethren churches as adult Sunday School curriculum..

BMH Books temporarily ceased publishing books in the late 1990s, but was restarted under a new board with Pastor Dan Thornton as chairman. BMH is run by its Executive Director Terry White and a new board elected in 2006. Major networking takes place by means of a bi-monthly publication FGBC World and the official BMH Blog.

In 2021, BMH and Charis Fellowship merged. The operations of BMH, including the book publishing and online communication assets continue as an extension of the Charis Fellowship.
