= Hanahan =

Hanahan may refer to:

- Douglas Hanahan, American microbiologist who developed SOB medium, and cancer researcher and co-author of the classic "Hallmarks of Cancer" paper
- Thomas J. Hanahan (1934-2009), American carpenter and politician
- Hanahan, South Carolina, city in the U.S.
