= Herman A. Hoyt =

American biblical scholar

Herman A. Hoyt (March 12, 1909 - August 29, 2000) was an American biblical scholar. He was one of the founding professors at Grace Theological Seminary in 1937. In 1962, he became president of Grace College and Seminary, a position he held until his retirement in 1976. His area of specialty was New Testament and Greek, but over the years he taught Hebrew, Old Testament, theology, and homiletics. A prolific writer, his work included major expositions of the books of Romans, Hebrews, and Revelation, along with Brethren ordinances and beliefs and eschatology.

== Personal life ==
Herman Arthur Hoyt was born on March 12, 1909, to Clarence Lyman Hoyt and Anna Leola Dorsey in Greenfield, Iowa, USA; he is the first child, and the eldest son in the family of ten children.

Hoyt received Christ due to the godly influence of his mother and Brethren Church pastors at Dallas Center, Iowa.

Following his eighth grade year, he taught at a local school for a year before high school, where he was the valedictorian of his class. He and his family moved to Ashland, Ohio, following his high school graduation. Once there, Hoyt attended Ashland College.

On August 30, 1930, Herman married his childhood sweetheart, Harriet Lucile Fitz.

He died on August 29, 2000, five years after Harriet. His funeral was held on September 2, 2000, in Strasburg, Pennsylvania. He is survived by his two sons, Joseph Paul of Walworth, WI, and Edwin Max of Pequea, PA; three grandchildren; five great-grandchildren; four brothers, Garner E. and Lowell, each of Dayton, TN, Solon W. of Winona Lake, IN, Eldon D. of Indianapolis, IN; and a sister, Thelma Gehman of Winona Lake, IN.

== Education ==
Hoyt read theology at Ashland College and Seminary and earned his A.B. (as valedictorian) and Th.B. degree (with highest honors).

== Ministry ==
Hoyt taught at Ashland Theological Seminary until 1937. He then co-founded Grace Theological Seminary with Alva J. McClain. He served as professor of New Testament, registrar, and later as dean, then president from 1962 to 1976.

Hoyt also co-founded the Brethren Missionary Herald Company of which he was a co-founder and was president of what would later be known as the Fellowship of Grace Brethren Churches.

== Publications ==
Hoyt wrote a number of books including;

- The End Times (1969)
- The First Christian Theology: Studies in Romans (1977)
- The Meaning of the Millennium: Four Views (1977)
- War: Four Christian Views (1981)
- Studies in Revelation (1983)

Academic offices
Preceded by Alva J. McClain	President of Grace Theological Seminary; 1962–1976	Succeeded by Homer A. Kent, Jr
