= Charis Alliance =

American Christian denomination

- Orientation: Anabaptist
- Theology: Modified Schwarzenau Brethren
- Origin: 2015
- Official website: charisalliance.org

Charis Alliance is a Christian denomination in the Schwarzenau Brethren tradition of Anabaptism. The word charis is Greek in origin, meaning "grace."

The Charis Alliance differs from traditional Schwarzenau Brethren groups in that it does not uphold the doctrine of conditional security as historically taught in Anabaptist theology.

== History ==
For the early history see Church of the Brethren.

=== The Great Schism ===
The Brethren (at the time called German Baptist Brethren) suffered a three-way division early in the 1880s, and the more progressive group organized the Brethren Church in 1883. Led by charismatic leader Henry Holsinger, they maintained the standard Brethren doctrines, but wanted to adopt new methods, and desired more congregational autonomy and less centralization. These more progressive Brethren moved into the direction of the mainstream of Christian evangelicalism in America. Several events in the late 19th century and early 20th century, including the Bible Conference movement, emphasis on foreign missions, and the rise of fundamentalism, affected the church. The Foreign Missionary Society of the Brethren Church was formed on September 4, 1900, in Winona Lake, Indiana.

=== Fundamentalism rising ===
But, also in the early 1900s, two different viewpoints began to emerge. As Robert Clouse writes about this event, "the Progressives showed considerable agreement in what they opposed, but were less united in what they wished to create." The Brethren Church had rejected classical liberal theology in 1921 with "The Message of the Brethren Ministry", written by J. Allen Miller and Alva J. McClain. However, the aggressive approach of fundamentalism, led by Louis S. Bauman and McClain, conflicted with the drawn-out approach of traditional Brethrenism. The fundamentalists desired strongly worded statements of faith, the traditional Brethren stressed non-creedalism. The classic dispensationalist belief held by the fundamentalists largely disregarded the Sermon on the Mount as a law for an earlier age, while the traditional Brethren statement "the New Testament is our Rule of Faith and Practice" placed a high emphasis on this passage in Matthew 5–7.

=== Division from the Brethren Church ===
This tension finally erupted in 1936–37 with a growing controversy at Ashland College. Although the school was under the control of the Brethren Church, it was transitioning from a Christian denominational school to a secular school with a more regional focus. Because of a push to enlarge non-Brethren representation on the board of trustees and establish a "double standard" of conduct for regular college students and pre-seminary students, Bauman and Charles Ashman, Sr. (1886–1967) resigned from the Ashland College board of trustees on June 1, 1937. The next day, professors Alva J. McClain and Herman Hoyt were fired from Ashland Seminary due to increasing tension between the college group and the seminary group. At a prayer meeting in the home of J.C. Beal that evening Grace Theological Seminary was born, where after prayer Bauman announced "I want to give the first gift to the new school."

In the next two years two groups emerged in the Brethren Church: those sympathetic with Ashland College and those sympathetic with Grace Seminary. Traditional Brethren, in part because of their drawn-out approach and in part due to their distaste for fundamentalist theology, sided with Ashland College, while the fundamentalists led by Bauman and McClain sided with Grace Seminary. In 1939, the Grace Seminary group formed the National Fellowship of Brethren Churches. The Fellowship incorporated in 1987 as the Fellowship of Grace Brethren Churches.

=== Departure of the Conservative Grace Brethren ===
Charis Fellowship USA logo

Another division occurred in 1992, involving a coalition of fundamentalist pastors who were troubled by the continuing "neo-evangelical" drift that they perceived taking root within the larger body of the FGBC, ultimately resulting in the formation of the Conservative Grace Brethren Churches, International (CGBCI). The immediate issue of dissension concerned the question of open membership in regard to individuals who had not been baptized by trine immersion (the historic Brethren standard, which the Brethren traditionally believe is taught in the language of Matt. 28:19). The Conservative pastors (so called because they desired to "conserve" Biblical truth) ultimately saw the broader issue as one involving Biblical Fundamentalism vs. an unduly pragmatic neo-evangelicalism, and ultimately withdrew from the larger body as a matter of conviction.

=== Charis Alliance ===
In 2015, delegates from ministries in all the countries who associate with the Grace Brethren gathered in Bangkok, Thailand and formed the Charis Alliance. The Global Charis alliance adopted the Charis Commitment to Common Identity.

== Beliefs ==
The fellowship has a confession of faith based on evangelical theology and the Believers' Church beliefs. They do not use the language of denomination, but instead choose "fellowship" as they have all wilfully chosen to hold these beliefs in unity

== Statistics ==
According to a denomination census released in 2023, it claimed 200 churches in the United States and Canada.

== Literature ==
- David R. Plaster: Finding our Focus: A History of the Grace Brethren Church, Winona Lake, IN: BMH Books, 2003.
- Todd S. Scoles: Restoring the Household: The Quest of the Grace Brethren Church, Winona Lake, IN: BMH Books, 2008.
- Frank S. Mead, Samuel S. Hill, & Craig D. Atwood: Handbook of Denominations
- Norman B. Rohrer: A Saint in Glory Stands: The Story of Alva J. McClain, Founder of Grace Theological Seminary, Winona Lake, IN: BMH Books, 1986.
