= Grace Theological Seminary =

Evangelical Christian seminary located in Winona Lake, Indiana

Coordinates: 41.2261557°N 85.8141565°W

- Motto: Character, Competence, Service
- Type: private coeducational
- Established: 1937
- Affiliations: Charis Fellowship
- Endowment: $10 million
- President: Drew Flamm
- Dean: Dr Freddy Cardoza
- Faculty: 8 full, 7 other
- Students: 160
- Location: Winona Lake, Indiana, United States
- Campus: rural: 165 acre (0.667 km²)
- Website: http://www.grace.edu/academics/seminary

Grace Theological Seminary (GTS) is a conservative evangelical Christian seminary located in Winona Lake, Indiana. GTS is now part of Grace College & Seminary and is associated with Charis Fellowship, before 2018 known as the Fellowship of Grace Brethren Churches. Alva J. McClain, the first president, and Herman A. Hoyt, the second president, founded the seminary in 1937. Its mission statement is: "Grace Theological Seminary is a learning community dedicated to teaching, training, and transforming the whole person for local church and global ministry." The seminary received school accreditation by the North Central Association and has been awarded accreditation by the Association of Theological Schools in the United States and Canada.

== History of Grace Theological Seminary ==
Grace Theological Seminary's early beginnings were from the roots of the Schwarzenau Brethren in Schwarzenau, Germany whose beliefs were Anabaptist and Pietistic.

== Notable alumni ==
- Robert Clouse (professor), Professor Emeritus at Indiana State University, author and leading expert in millennial thought and eschatological studies
- Gary G. Cohen, President Emeritus of Cohen Theological Seminary
- John Dekker, missionary to the Dani people
- David Dockery, Chancellor and Former President of Trinity International University
- Louie Giglio, Pastor of Passion City Church, Speaker/Founder of Passion Movement, Author
- Homer Kent, author, theologian.
- Mark Keough, incoming Republican member of the Texas House of Representatives, pastor in The Woodlands, Texas
- Rolland D. McCune, Systematic theologian and former President of Detroit Baptist Theological Seminary
- J. Ramsey Michaels, Professor and theologian
- John C. Whitcomb, Old Testament theologian and young Earth creationist.

== Publications ==
Between 1980 and 1991 the seminary published the Grace Theological Journal.

== See also ==
- Billy Sunday, evangelist who lived in Winona Lake, Indiana
- Louis Bauman
