= Bible Conference Movement =

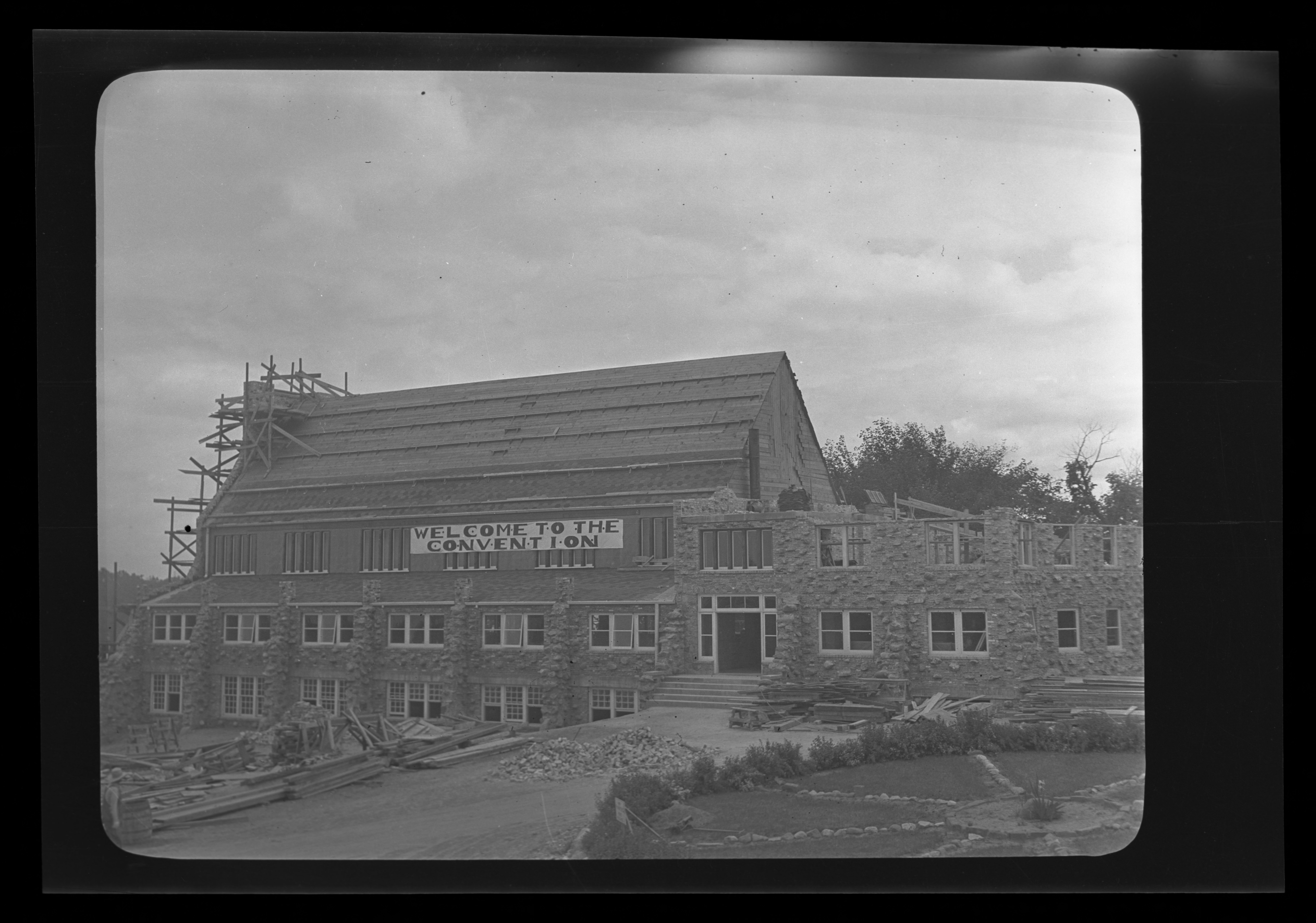
Mission Farms Memorial Chapel, under construction, with banner, "Welcome to the Convention" for the Northwestern Bible conference, circa 1934.

The Bible Conference Movement was an interdenominational network of Protestant gatherings that began in the last decades of the nineteenth century and played an integral role in the rise of fundamentalism and the success of evangelicalism in the twentieth century. Audiences flocked to hear well known religious personalities and Bible teachers speak on popular theological currents, missionary themes, end-times speculation, and renewal. Bible conferences combined elements of earlier Christian revivalism, efforts for social reform, and recreation.

== Early Formation ==
According to historian Mark Sidwell, Bible Conferences may have tapped into the historical impulse for the Pietist “ecclesiola in Ecclesia” or “little church within the church.” Antecedents also included the frontier Camp Meetings of the Second Great Awakening and Keswick Convention meetings. There were elements that resembled the Chautauqua Movement and Bible Conferences were part of the legacy of evangelicalism's “Benevolent Empire” which was embodied in social reform efforts including the Temperance Movement and abolitionism. Bible Conferences were also intertwined with the rise and formation of Protestant fundamentalism in the last decades of the 19th century.

It is generally agreed that the formative Bible Conferences were the Niagara Bible Conference, first held in 1883 and organized by George Needham, D. L. Moody’s Northfield Bible Conference in Massachusetts, and a series of Bible and Prophecy Conferences that were organized between 1878 and 1914 with the support of a veritable “who’s who” of fundamentalist leaders including James Brookes, A. J. Gordon, and Arthur Tappan Pierson, to name a few.

== Expansion in the Twentieth Century ==
Especially after the Scopes Trial in 1925, as fundamentalists lost control at the denominational level, Bible conferences served as an important link in a growing and successful fundamentalist network that included influential personalities, “parachurch” organizations such as Youth for Christ, and the growing Bible College Movement. The number of Bible Conferences grew immensely after 1900 but was in decline by the 1950s. Significant twentieth century Bible Conferences were held in Sandy Cove in New Jersey, along Schroon Lake and in Ebenezer in New York as well as Montrose, Pennsylvania. Midwest conferences were held in Northeast Indiana along the shore of Winona Lake, in cities such as Chicago, and in the rural areas of Iowa [Cedar Falls and Okoboji]. On the west coast, Bible Conferences were held at Mount Herman, California. Popular speakers sometimes made their way from one conference venue to another as they traveled the Bible Conference “circuit.”

== Significance and legacy ==
The Bible Conference Movement contributed to the rise of Premillennialism, which led to a strong emphasis on the End Times. Gatherings that focused exclusively on eschatology were often called Prophecy Conferences. Bible Conferences also helped to popularize the Scofield Reference Bible and contributed to the founding of organizations such as the World Christian Fundamentals Association. Evangelicals came to see Bible Conferences not only as gatherings for spiritual teaching and Bible study, but also as places for spiritual renewal and recreation that did not compromise conservative standards of Christian morality. The Winona Lake Bible Conferences, which had roots in the Chautauqua idea and grew to become perhaps the most well-known Bible Conferences, combined many of these spiritual and theological emphases. In the 1960s Winona Lake was specifically promoted as a Christian vacation and resort spot.
