= Winona Lake, Indiana =

- Town
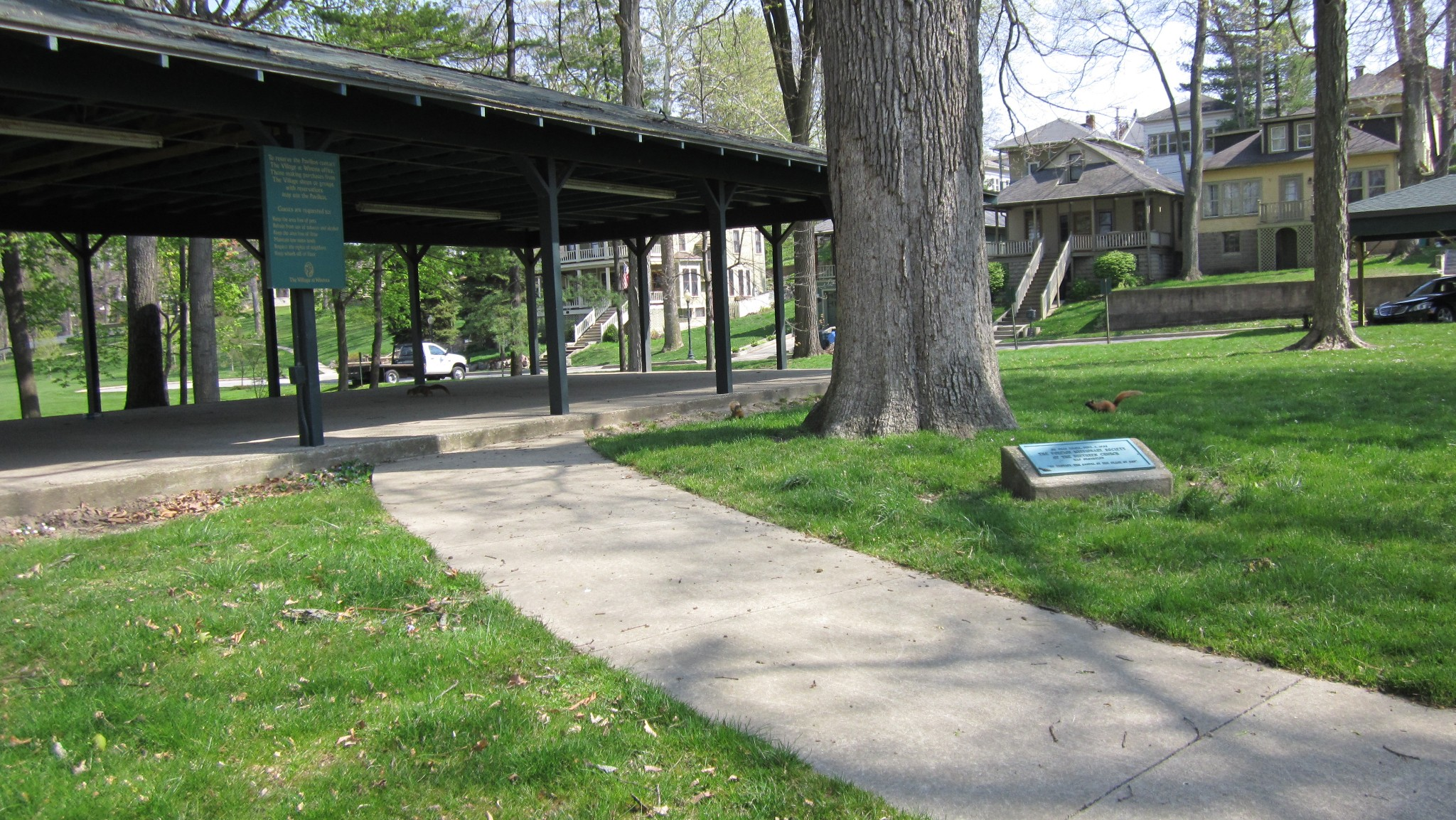

- Flag Logo

- Location of Winona Lake in Kosciusko County, Indiana.
- Coordinates: 41°12′57″N 85°48′33″W
- Country: United States
- State: Indiana
- County: Kosciusko
- Township: Wayne

Area
  - Total: 3.43 sq mi (8.89 km^{2})
  - Land: 2.94 sq mi (7.61 km^{2})
  - Water: 0.49 sq mi (1.28 km^{2})
- Elevation: 866 ft (264 m)

Population (2020)
  - Total: 5,053
  - Density: 1,720.5/sq mi (664.29/km^{2})
- Time zone: UTC-5 (Eastern (EST))
  - Summer (DST): UTC-4 (EDT)
- ZIP code: 46590
- Area code: 574
- FIPS code: 18-84950
- GNIS feature ID: 2397751
- Website: winonalake.in.gov

Winona Lake is a town in Wayne Township, Kosciusko County, in the U.S. state of Indiana, and is a major suburb of Warsaw. As of the 2020 census, Winona Lake had a population of 5,053.

== Geography ==
Winona Lake is now contiguous to Warsaw, the two towns having merged as they have expanded.

According to the 2010 census, Winona Lake has a total area of 3.25 square miles (8.42 km^{2}), of which 0.49 sq mi (1.27 km^{2}) (or 15.08%) is covered by water.

== History ==
Winona Lake is best known for the lake after which it is named and built on, although the lake was originally known as Eagle Lake. Located along the eastern shore of the lake, the Winona Lake Historic District includes various historic homes and other buildings that attest to the area's history as a Chautauqua and Bible conference hotspot. It is also the home of Grace College and Grace Theological Seminary, and was the home of famed preacher and professional baseball player Billy Sunday, who died in 1935. The Billy Sunday Home has been preserved as a museum. Christian musician and preacher Homer Rodeheaver also made Winona Lake his home from 1912 until his death in 1955. The Winona School of Professional Photography was started there in 1912 (as the Indiana School of Photography) and was operated by the Professional Photographers of America until its move to Chicago (Mount Prospect) in 1988. Famous photographers from around the world taught there during summer-only classes. The now defunct Winona College was founded here, and the Winona Lake School of Theology was located here from 1920 to 1970. Winona Lake was also home to the headquarters of The Free Methodist Church until it moved its offices to Indianapolis in 1990. Winona Lake also contained Hephzibah House, a behavioral modification school, often criticized for their physical, sexual, and mental abuse of underage girls. Despite numerous complaints filed, local law enforcement never went after the school and it was shut down in March 2020 after an episode of Dr. Phil exposed the school.

The Winona Lake Historic District was listed on the National Register of Historic Places in 1993.

== Demographics ==
Historical population
| Census | Pop. | Note | %± |
|---|---|---|---|
| 1920 | 300 | | — |
| 1930 | 454 | | 51.3% |
| 1940 | 743 | | 63.7% |
| 1950 | 1,366 | | 83.8% |
| 1960 | 1,928 | | 41.1% |
| 1970 | 2,811 | | 45.8% |
| 1980 | 2,827 | | 0.6% |
| 1990 | 4,053 | | 43.4% |
| 2000 | 3,987 | | −1.6% |
| 2010 | 4,908 | | 23.1% |
| 2020 | 5,053 | | 3.0% |
U.S. Decennial Census

=== 2020 census ===
As of the 2020 census, Winona Lake had a population of 5,053. The median age was 28.6 years. 19.7% of residents were under the age of 18 and 15.3% of residents were 65 years of age or older. For every 100 females there were 86.8 males, and for every 100 females age 18 and over there were 83.7 males age 18 and over.

100.0% of residents lived in urban areas, while 0.0% lived in rural areas.

There were 1,660 households in Winona Lake, of which 31.6% had children under the age of 18 living in them. Of all households, 53.3% were married-couple households, 17.3% were households with a male householder and no spouse or partner present, and 24.2% were households with a female householder and no spouse or partner present. About 29.2% of all households were made up of individuals and 14.2% had someone living alone who was 65 years of age or older.

There were 1,938 housing units, of which 14.3% were vacant. The homeowner vacancy rate was 1.3% and the rental vacancy rate was 8.5%.

Racial composition as of the 2020 census
| Race | Number | Percent |
|---|---|---|
| White | 4,398 | 87.0% |
| Black or African American | 84 | 1.7% |
| American Indian and Alaska Native | 20 | 0.4% |
| Asian | 56 | 1.1% |
| Native Hawaiian and Other Pacific Islander | 1 | 0.0% |
| Some other race | 206 | 4.1% |
| Two or more races | 288 | 5.7% |
| Hispanic or Latino (of any race) | 449 | 8.9% |

=== 2010 census ===
At the 2010 census, 4,908 people, 1,569 households, and 1,098 families were living in the town. The population density was 1,778.3 inhabitants per square mile (686.6/km^{2}). The 1,786 housing units had an average density of 647.1 per square mile (249.8/km^{2}). The racial makeup of the town was 92.2% White, 1.5% African American, 0.1% Native American, 1.0% Asian, 4.0% from other races, and 1.2% from two or more races. Hispanics or Latinos of any race were 7.4%.

Of the 1,569 households, 35.2% had children under 18 living with them, 57.9% were married couples living together, 8.2% had a female householder with no husband present, 4.0% had a male householder with no wife present, and 30.0% were not families. About 25.0% of households were one person, and 11.1% were one person 65 or older. The average household size was 2.62 and the average family size was 3.13.

The median age in the town was 28.3 years. The age distribution was 23.7% under 18, 22.3% from 18 to 24, 21.3% from 25 to 44, 19.9% from 45 to 64, and 12.7% were 65 or older. The gender makeup of the town was 46.6% male and 53.4% female.

=== 2000 census ===
At the 2000 census, 3,987 people, 1,371 households, and 972 families resided in the town. The population density was 1,375.7 inhabitants per square mile (531.2/km^{2}). The 1,513 housing units had an average density of 522.0/sq mi (201.5/km^{2}). The racial makeup of the town was 91.15% White, 0.75% African American, 0.03% Native American, 0.85% Asian, 0.03% Pacific Islander, 5.74% from other races, and 1.45% from two or more races. Hispanics or Latinos of any race were 8.28%.

Of the 1,371 households, 39.4% had children under 18 living with them, 58.8% were married couples living together, 8.5% had a female householder with no husband present, and 29.1% were not families. About 23.3% of households were one person, and 5.3% were one person 65 or older. The average household size was 2.73 and the average family size was 3.25.

The age distribution was 28.8% under 18, 10.2% from 18 to 24, 29.2% from 25 to 44, 18.8% from 45 to 64, and 12.9% were 65 or older. The median age was 32 years. For every 100 females, there were 95.6 males. For every 100 females 18 and over, there were 91.9 males.

The median income for a household was $42,454 and for a family was $50,817. Males had a median income of $35,313 versus $25,769 for females. The per capita income for the town was $19,025. About 3.6% of families and 6.7% of the population were below the poverty line, including 5.3% of those under 18 and 7.0% of those 65 or over.

== See also ==
- 1947 Prohibition National Convention
- 1959 Prohibition National Convention
