= Christian Congregation =

Christian Congregation may refer to:

- Church (congregation), a Christian body of followers meeting in a particular area
- Christian Congregation (Pentecostal), an organization of Pentecostal churches with roots in the Italian Pentecostal Movement
  - Christian Congregation in the United States
  - Christian Congregation of Brazil
  - Christian Congregation in Ireland
- Christian Congregation (Restoration Movement), a Congregational church in the United States
- Christian Congregation of Jehovah's Witnesses, a Jehovah's Witnesses organization in the United States
