= Ordinance (Christianity) =

Religious rituals in Christianity

An ordinance is a term used by certain Christian denominations for a religious ritual that was instituted by Jesus for Christians to observe.

Examples of ordinances include baptism and the Lord's Supper, both of which are practiced in denominations including the Anabaptist, Baptist, Churches of Christ, and Pentecostal denominations. Some churches, including those of the Anabaptists, include headcovering and footwashing as ordinances.

The number of ordinances depends on the Christian denomination, with Mennonite Anabaptists counting seven ordinances, while Baptists typically name two or three.

== Distinctions ==
Christian traditions, including Anabaptists (such as Mennonites and Schwarzenau Brethren), Churches of Christ, Christian Churches/Churches of Christ, Disciples of Christ, refer to "ordinances", rather than "sacraments". While a sacrament is seen as a means of grace from God, an ordinance is a practice that rather demonstrates the participants' faith. Roman Catholics, Eastern Orthodox, and Protestant traditions (Lutherans, Anglicans, Methodists, Moravians, Continental Reformed, Presbyterians and Congregationalists) prefer the use of the term "sacrament".

=== Anabaptism ===
For Anabaptists, "ordinances brought one into conformity with the truth of Jesus Christ, whose life, crucifixion, death, and resurrection had so fundamentally altered all of humanity and creation that human beings were now capable of works of loving obedience that revealed the indwelling presence of God in Christ in all people."

Seven ordinances have been taught in many Conservative Mennonite churches, which include "baptism, communion, footwashing, marriage, anointing with oil, the holy kiss, and the prayer covering."

The Dunkard Brethren Church, a Conservative Anabaptist denomination in the Schwarzenau Brethren tradition, includes baptism, feetwashing, communion, the holy kiss, headcovering, and anointing of the sick among the ordinances of the Church. Feetwashing, communion and the holy kiss occur during the lovefeast.

=== Baptists ===
In the Baptist tradition, the terms "sacrament" and "ordinance" are used interchangeably with reference to baptism and the Lord's Supper, with these being established explicitly by Jesus Christ. Additional ordinances include the laying on of hands (for the confirmation of believers and during ordination), which is named in the Standard Confession (1660), as well as the Washing of the Saints’ feet, which is practiced by certain Baptist denominations such as the Freewill Baptists. Certain churches in the Baptist tradition, particularly those that are Reformed Baptist, observe head covering for Christian women during prayer and worship as a biblical ordinance.

=== Mormonism ===
The Church of Jesus Christ of Latter-day Saints (Mormons) uses the term ordinance, however the underlying belief is sacramental. Rituals such as baptism, confirmation, initiatory (Chrismation), ordination, endowment (formal vows and reception of sacred vestments) and marriage are referred to as "saving ordinances", as they are considered transformative and necessary for salvation and exaltation. Similar to Catholic sacraments, Mormon ordinances are only considered valid if performed by ordained clergy with apostolic succession reaching back to Jesus through Peter.

=== Pentecostalism ===
The Calvary Holiness Association, a Holiness Pentecostal denomination, affirms the ordinances of baptism, the Lord's Supper, and the washing of the Saint's feet.

Certain Pentecostal denominations, such as the Ukrainian Pentecostal Church and the Christian Congregation, among others, observe the ordinance of women's headcovering in obedience to 1 Corinthians 11:4–13.

== See also ==
- Born again
- Infused righteousness
- Ordinance (Latter Day Saints)
- Sola gratia
