= Foot washing =

Foot washing may refer to:

- Maundy (foot washing), a religious rite involving foot washing observed by various Christian denominations
- Wudu, the Islamic procedure for cleansing parts of the body which involves foot washing
