= Maundy (foot washing) =

Washing of the feet as a religious rite in Christianity

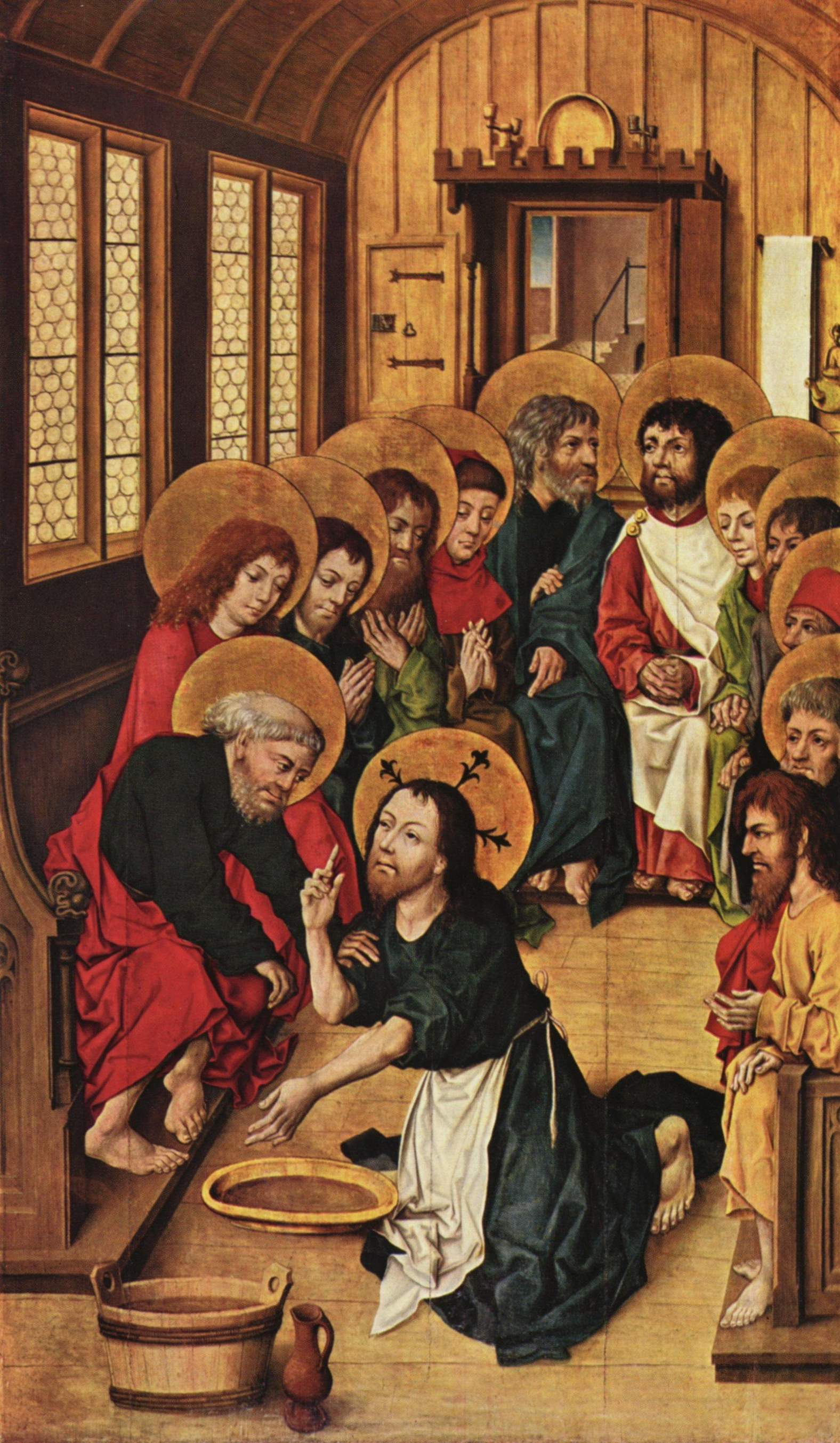
Christ Washing the Feet of the Apostles by the Meister des Hausbuches, 1475 (Gemäldegalerie, Berlin)

Maundy (from Old French mandé, from Latin mandatum meaning "command"), or Washing of the Saints' Feet, Washing of the Feet, Nipter, or Pedelavium or Pedilavium, is a religious rite observed by various Christian denominations. The word mandatum is the first word of the antiphon sung at the rite of washing the feet: Mandatum novum do vobis ("I give you a new commandment", John 13:34).

The ceremony commemorates the commandment of Christ that his disciples should emulate his loving humility in the washing of the feet (John 13:14–17). The medieval Latin term mandatum (mandé, maundy), came to apply to the rite of foot-washing on the Thursday preceding Easter Sunday, known in English as "Maundy Thursday" since at least 1440 (written as Maunde þursday).

Some Christian denominations throughout Church history have practiced foot washing as a church ordinance, including Adventists, Anabaptists, Free Will Baptists, Missionary Methodists, and Pentecostals. Of these, certain denominations, such as the Dunkard Brethren Church, regularly practice feetwashing as part of the lovefeast, which includes the holy kiss, feetwashing, communion, and a communal meal. (Note: In Conservative Anabaptist denominations, such as the Dunkard Brethren and Conservative Mennonite traditions, feetwashing is counted as being among the ordinances of the Church.) Many Christian denominations (including Catholics, Lutherans, Anglicans, as well as certain Presbyterians and Methodists, among others) observe the liturgical washing of the feet on Maundy Thursday of Holy Week.

== Biblical reference and background ==
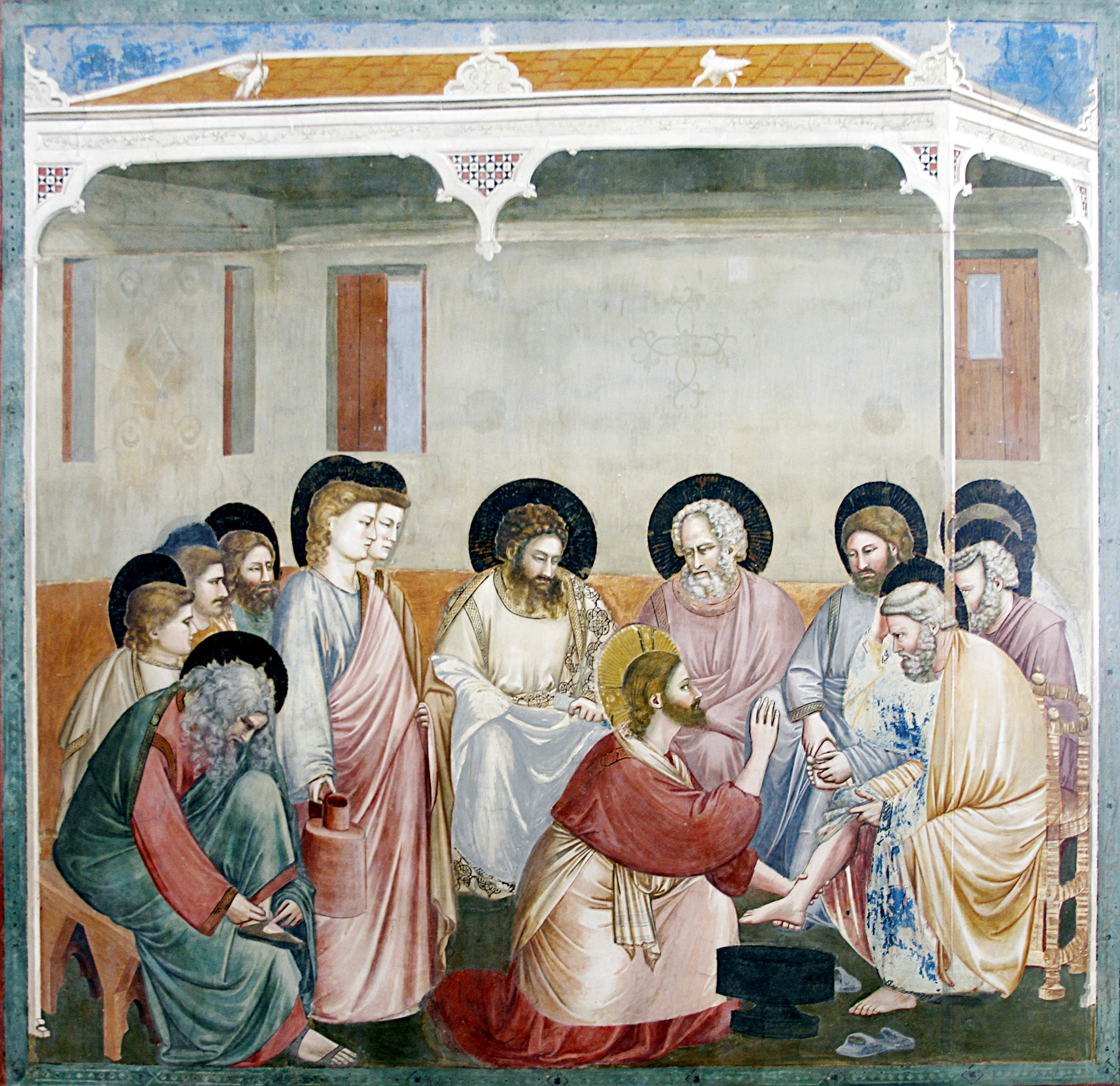
Christ Reasoning with Peter, by Giotto di Bondone (Scrovegni Chapel a Padua)

The example and command foot washing of Jesus is found in John 13:1–15 (KJV):

Now before the feast of the passover, when Jesus knew that his hour was come that he should depart out of this world unto the Father, having loved his own which were in the world, he loved them unto the end. [...] He riseth from supper, and laid aside his garments; and took a towel, and girded himself. After that he poureth water into a basin, and began to wash the disciples' feet, and to wipe them with the towel wherewith he was girded. Then cometh he to Simon Peter: and Peter saith unto him, Lord, dost thou wash my feet? Jesus answered and said unto him, What I do thou knowest not now; but thou shalt know hereafter. Peter saith unto him, Thou shalt never wash my feet. Jesus answered him, If I wash thee not, thou hast no part with me. Simon Peter saith unto him, Lord, not my feet only, but also my hands and my head. Jesus saith to him, He that is washed needeth not save to wash his feet, but is clean every whit: and ye are clean, but not all. For he knew who should betray him; therefore said he, Ye are not all clean. So after he had washed their feet, and had taken his garments, and was set down again, he said unto them, Know ye what I have done to you? Ye call me Master and Lord: and ye say well; for so I am. If I then, your Lord and Master, have washed your feet; ye also ought to wash one another's feet. For I have given you an example, that ye should do as I have done to you.

Jesus demonstrates the custom of the time when he comments on the lack of hospitality in one Pharisee's home by not providing water to wash his feet in Luke 7:44:

And he turned to the woman, and said unto Simon, Seest thou this woman? I entered into thine house, thou gavest me no water for my feet: but she hath washed my feet with tears, and wiped them with the hairs of her head.

Foot washing is mentioned in several places in the Old Testament of the Bible (e.g. Genesis 18:4; 19:2; 24:32; 43:24; 1 Samuel 25:41; et al.). 1 Samuel 25:41 is the first biblical passage where an honored person offers to wash feet as a sign of humility. In John 12, Mary of Bethany anointed Jesus' feet presumably in gratitude for raising her brother Lazarus from the dead, and in preparation for his death and burial. The Bible records washing of the saint's feet being practised by the early church in I Timothy 5:10 perhaps in reference to piety, submission and/or humility. There are several names for this practice: maundy, foot washing, washing the saints' feet, pedilavium, and mandatum.

== History ==
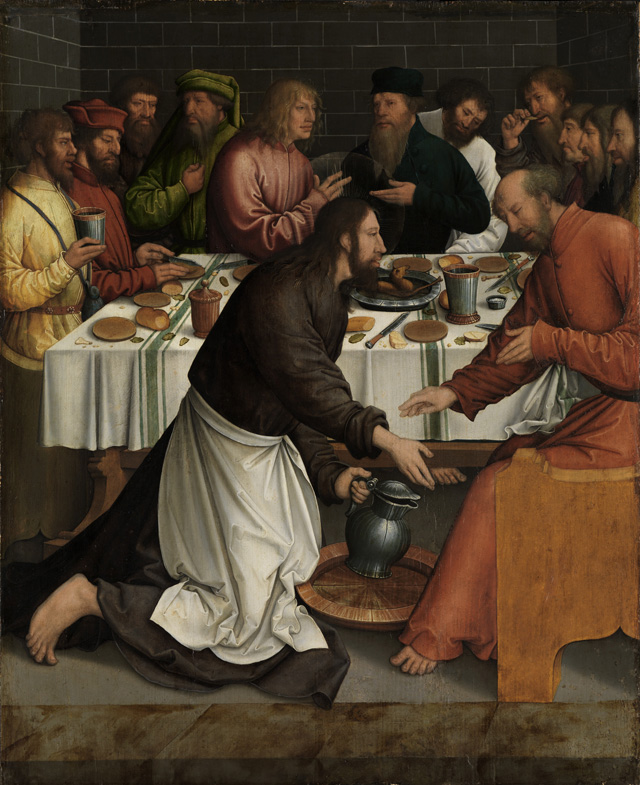
Feetwashing of the Christ, Oil painting of Bernhard Strigel

The rite of foot washing finds its roots in scripture, where Jesus tells his followers "to wash one another's feet" (cf. John 13:1–17). After the death of the apostles or the end of the Apostolic Age, the practice was continued.

Footwashing was practiced in the early centuries of post-apostolic Christianity, with Tertullian (145–220) mentioning the practice as being a part of Christian worship in his De Corona. Footwashing was done with a basin "of water for the saints' feet" and a "linen towel", prior to the reception of the Eucharist. Additionally, in the 1st century, Christian women went to locations in which marginalized people resided (such as prisons) and washed their feet. The early Church Father Clement of Alexandria linked the new sandals given to the Prodigal Son with feetwashing, describing "non-perishable shoes that are only fit to be worn by those who have had their feet washed by Jesus, the Teacher and Lord." The early Church thus saw footwashing to be connected to repentance, involving a spiritual cleansing by Jesus.

Around 256 AD, Cyprian, the bishop of Carthage, wrote about footwashing teaching "the hands how to act in service".

It was practiced by the Church at Milan (c. 380) and is mentioned by the Council of Elvira (300). The Church Fathers Origen, as well as John Chrysostom and Augustine (c. 400) encouraged the practice as an imitation of Christ.

Observance of foot washing at the time of baptism was maintained in Africa, Gaul, Germany, Milan, northern Italy, and Ireland.

According to the Mennonite Encyclopedia "St. Benedict's Rule (529) for the Benedictine Order prescribed hospitality feetwashing in addition to a communal feetwashing for humility"; a statement confirmed by the Catholic Encyclopedia. It apparently was established in the Roman church, though not in connection with baptism, by the 8th century.

The Greek Orthodox Church counted footwashing among the sacraments, though it was not practiced that often.

The Synod of Toledo (694) "declared that footwashing should be observed on Maundy Thursday" and Roman Catholic churches thus came to observe footwashing on that day.

The Albigenses and the Waldenses' practiced footwashing as a rite.

There is some evidence that it was observed by the early Hussites; and the practice was a meaningful part of the 16th century radical reformation, which resulted in Anabaptist denominations regularly practicing footwashing as an ordinance.

== Denominations practicing ritual foot-washing ==
Many Christian denominations (including Catholics, Lutherans, Anglicans, as well as certain Presbyterians and Methodists, among others) observe the liturgical washing of the feet on Maundy Thursday of Holy Week. Some Christian denominations throughout Church history have practiced foot washing as a church ordinance, including Adventists, Anabaptists (such as Conservative Mennonites and the Dunkard Brethren), Free Will Baptists, Missionary Methodists, and Pentecostals. Of these, certain denominations, such as the Dunkard Brethren Church, regularly practice feetwashing as part of the lovefeast, which includes the holy kiss, feetwashing, communion, and a communal meal. (Note: In Conservative Anabaptist denominations, such as the Dunkard Brethren and Conservative Mennonite traditions, feetwashing is counted as being among the ordinances of the Church.)

=== Roman Catholic ===
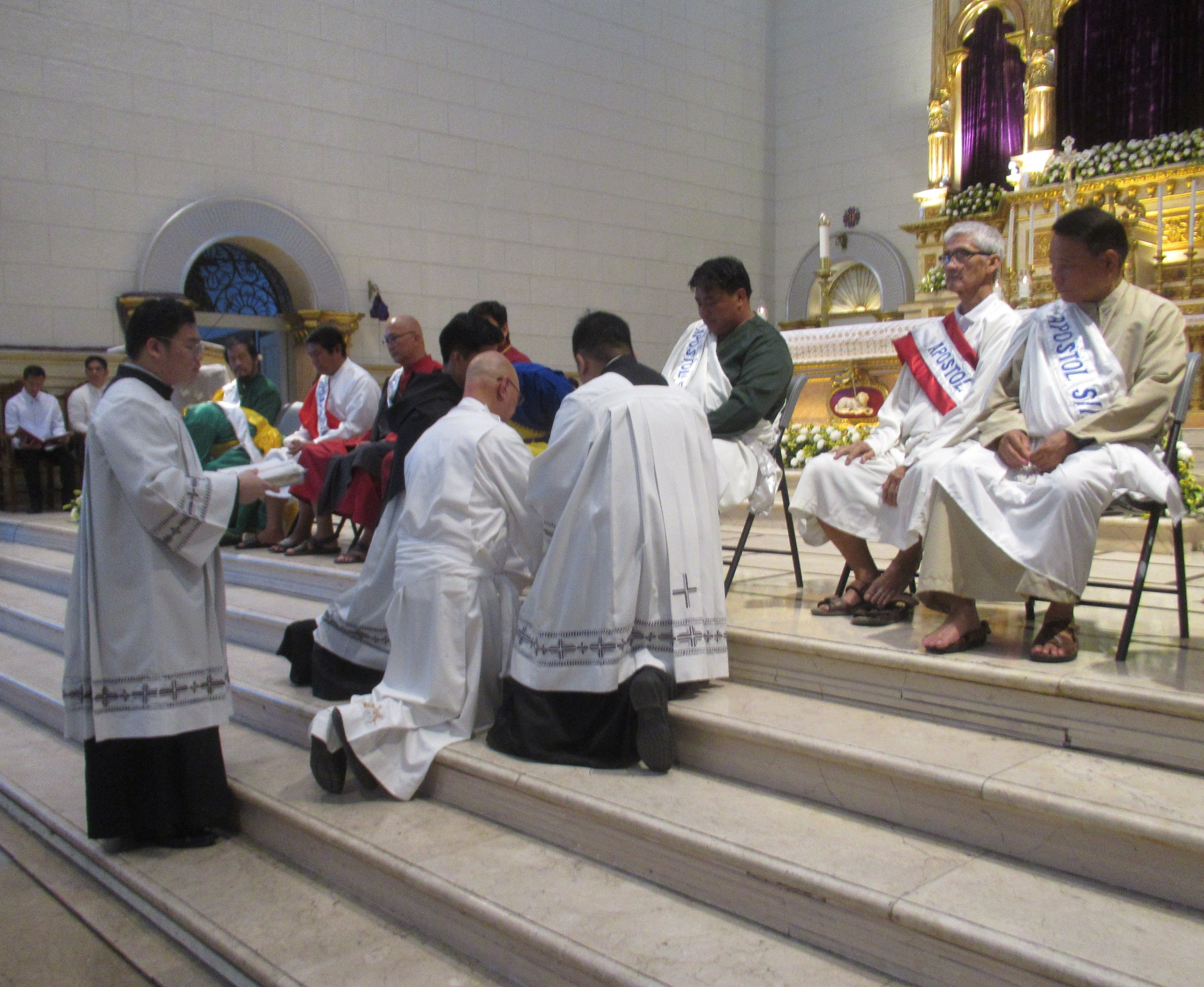
Feet washing in 2024, Bulacan

In the Catholic Church, the ritual washing of feet is now associated with the Mass of the Lord's Supper, which celebrates in a special way the Last Supper of Jesus, before which he washed the feet of his twelve apostles.

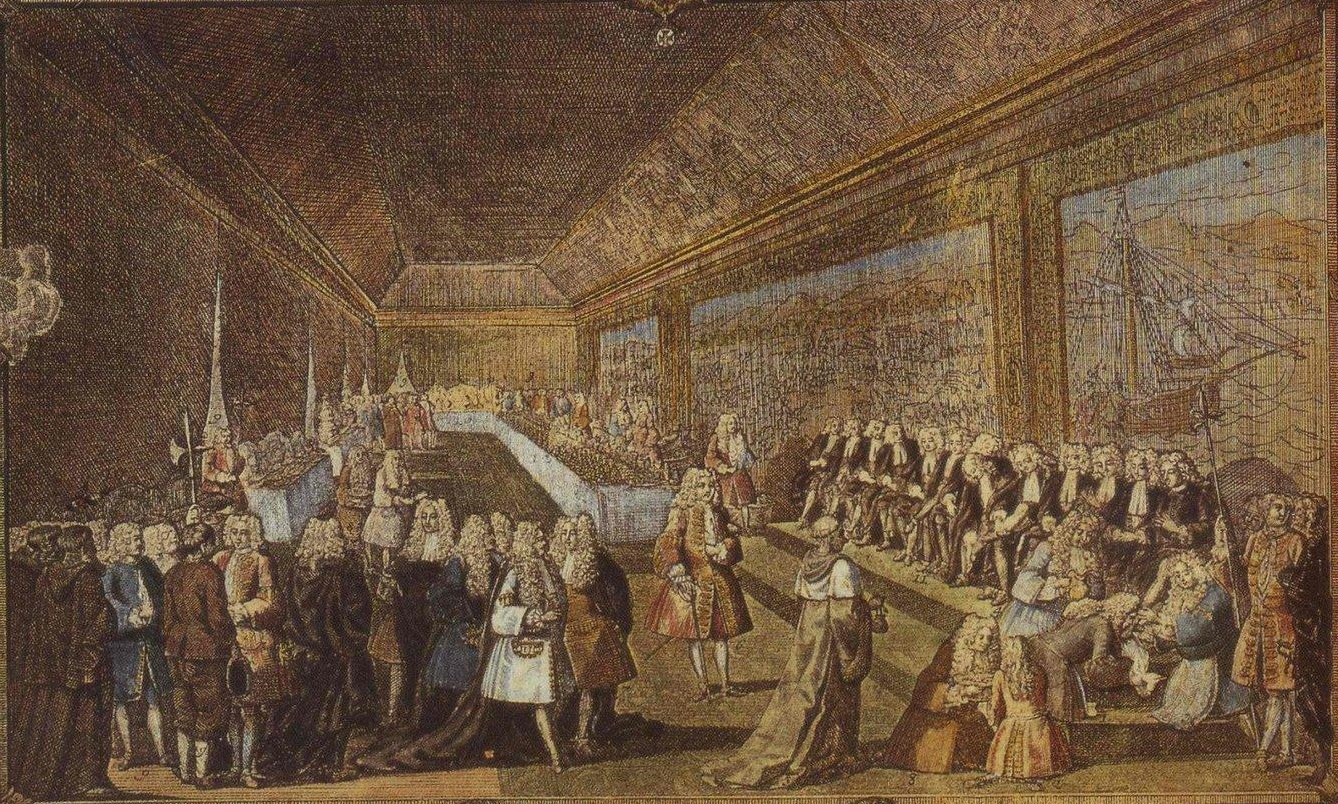
John V of Portugal performs the Washing of the Feet rite in Ribeira Palace, 1748.

Evidence for the practice on this day goes back at least to the latter half of the 12th century, when "the pope washed the feet of twelve sub-deacons after his Mass and of thirteen poor men after his dinner." From 1570 to 1955, the foot-washing service was celebrated separately from that of the Holy Thursday Mass, typically done several hours after the Mass had ended. For many years Pius IX performed the foot-washing in the sala over the portico of St. Peter's Basilica.

In 1955 Pope Pius XII revised the ritual and inserted it into the Mass. Since then, the rite is celebrated after the homily that follows the reading of the gospel account of how Jesus washed the feet of his twelve apostles (John 13:1–15). Some persons who have been selected – usually twelve, but the Roman Missal does not specify the number – are led to chairs prepared in a suitable place. The priest goes to each and, with the help of the ministers, pours water over each one's feet and dries them. There are some advocates of restricting this ritual to clergy or at least men.

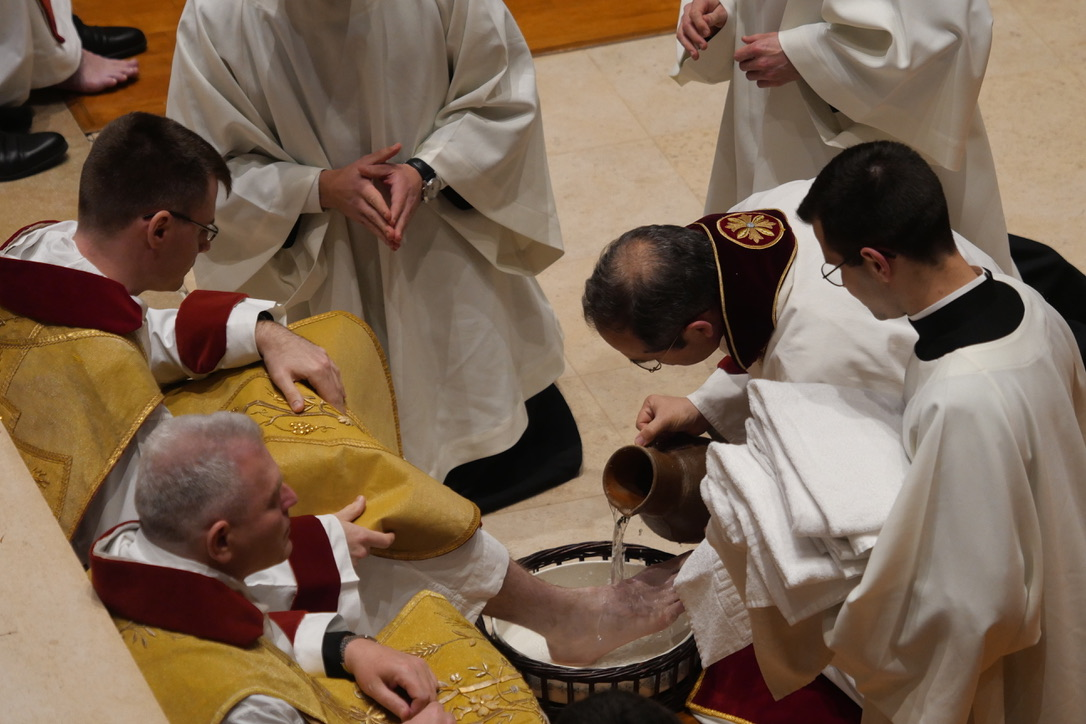
Maundy, catholic church in France, Community of Saint Martin (2024)

In a notable break from the 1955 norms, Pope Francis washed the feet of two women and Muslims at a juvenile detention center in Rome in 2013. In 2016 it was announced that the Roman Missal had been revised to permit women to have their feet washed on Maundy Thursday; previously it permitted only males to do so. In 2016 Catholic priests around the world washed both women's and men's feet on Holy Thursday and "their gesture of humility represented to many the progress of inclusion in the Catholic church."

At one time, most of the European monarchs also performed feet washing in their royal courts on Maundy Thursday, a practice continued by the Austro-Hungarian Emperor and the King of Spain up to the beginning of the 20th century (see Royal Maundy). In 1181 Roger de Moulins, Grand Master of the Knights Hospitaller issued a statute declaring, "In Lent every Saturday, they are accustomed to celebrate maundy for thirteen poor persons, and to wash their feet, and to give to each a shirt and new breeches and new shoes, and to three chaplains, or to three clerics out of the thirteen, three deniers and to each of the others, two deniers".

=== Lutheran and Anglican ===
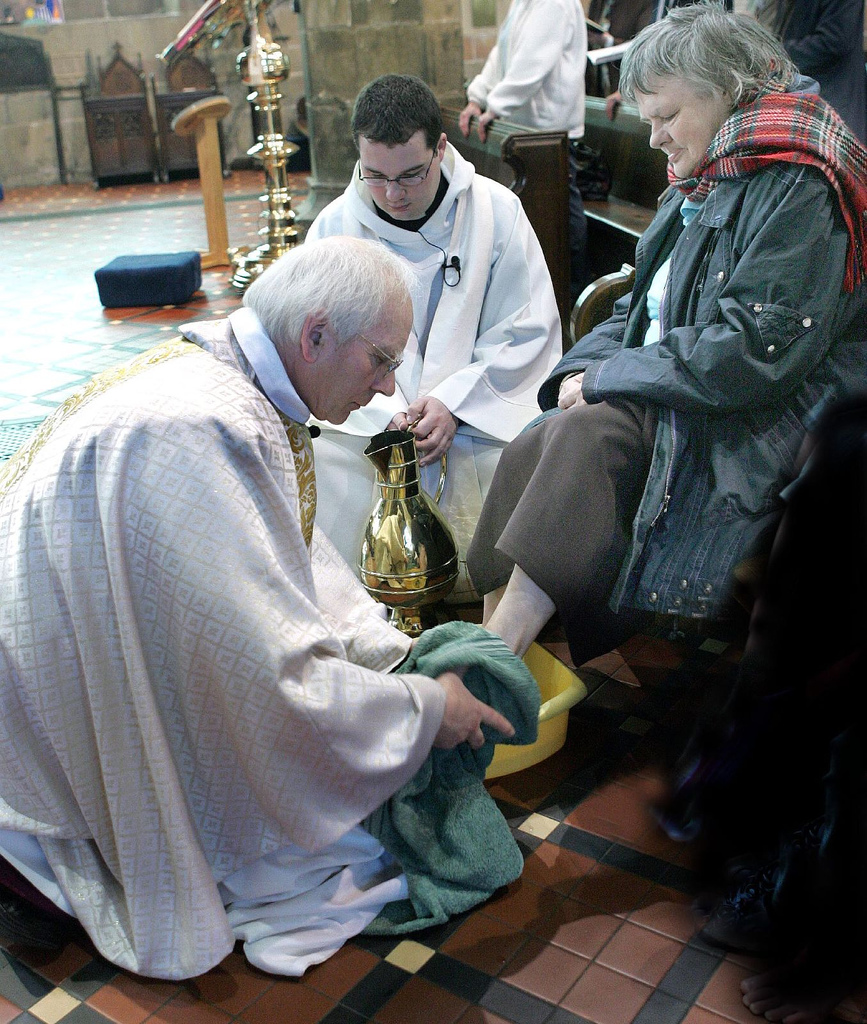
Foot washing by the Anglican bishop of St Asaph, Church in Wales, Maundy Thursday (2007)

Foot washing rites are practiced by the Lutheran and Anglican churches and is most often carried out during the liturgy of the Eucharist of Lord's supper on Maundy Thursday. The priest washes the feet of women and men in the congregation, as Christ did before the Last Supper, before the Eucharist, Stripping of the Altar and removal of the blessed sacrament to a place of repose.

Foot-washing is sometimes performed at ordination services where the Bishop may wash the feet of those who are to be ordained. It has at times been practiced in connection with baptism, and at times as a separate occasion. In the Anglican church the King of England, as Supreme Governor undertakes the commemoration of Royal Maundy instead of washing feet.

=== Eastern Orthodox and Byzantine Catholic ===
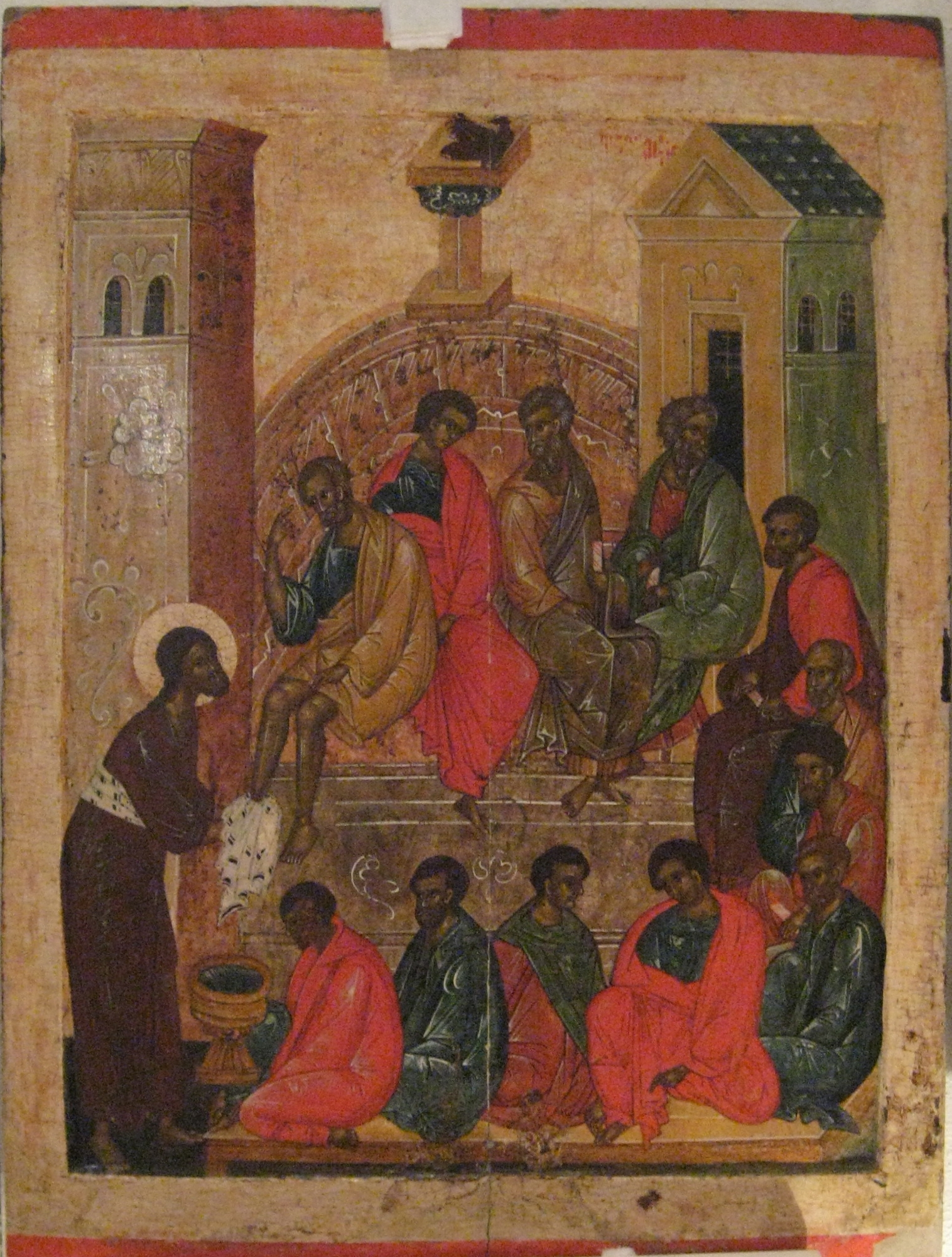
Orthodox icon of Christ washing the feet of the Apostles (16th century, Pskov school of iconography)

The Eastern Orthodox and Eastern Catholic Churches practice the ritual of the Washing of Feet on Holy and Great Thursday (Maundy Thursday) according to their ancient rites. The service may be performed either by a bishop, washing the feet of twelve priests; or by an Hegumen (Abbot) washing the feet of twelve members of the brotherhood of his monastery. The ceremony takes place at the end of the Divine Liturgy.

After Holy Communion, and before the dismissal, the brethren all go in procession to the place where the Washing of Feet is to take place (it may be in the center of the nave, in the narthex, or a location outside). After a psalm and some troparia (hymns) an ektenia (litany) is recited, and the bishop or abbot reads a prayer. Then the deacon reads the account in the Gospel of John, while the clergy perform the roles of Christ and his apostles as each action is chanted by the deacon. The deacon stops when the dialogue between Jesus and Peter begins. The senior-ranking clergyman among those whose feet are being washed speaks the words of Peter, and the bishop or abbot speaks the words of Jesus. Then the bishop or abbot himself concludes the reading of the Gospel, after which he says another prayer and sprinkles all of those present with the water that was used for the foot washing. The procession then returns to the church and the final dismissal is given as normal.

=== Oriental Orthodox ===
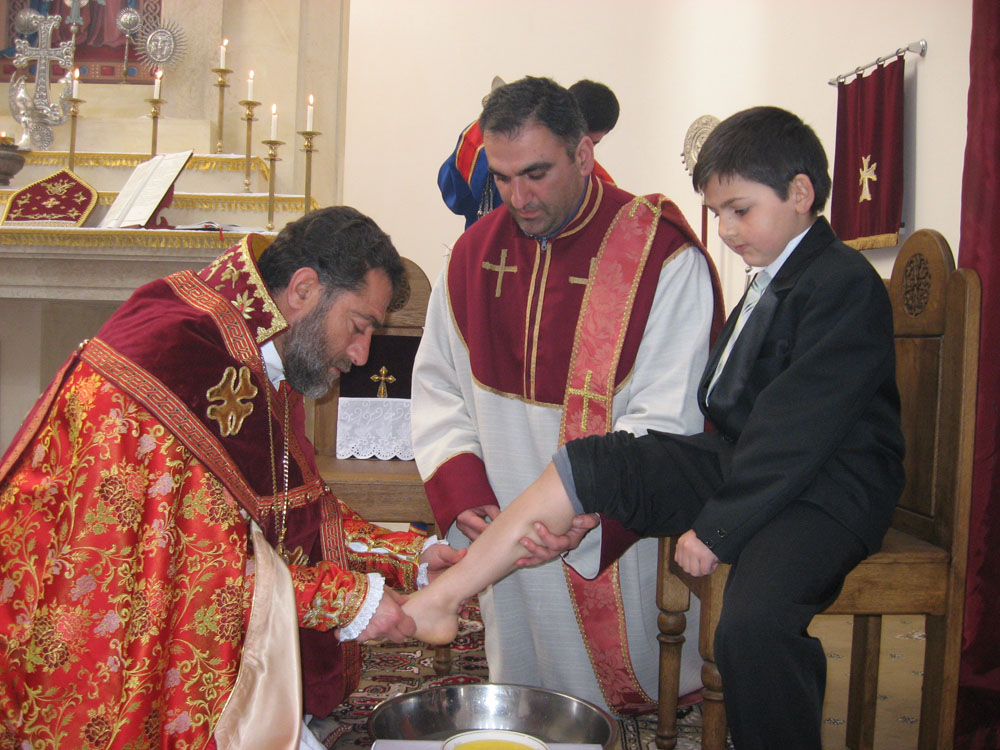
Bishop Sebouh Chouldjian of the Armenian Apostolic Church washing the feet of children

Foot washing rites are also observed in the Oriental Orthodox churches on Maundy Thursday.

In the Coptic Orthodox Church the service is performed by the parish priest. He blesses the water for the foot washing with the cross, just as he would for blessing holy water and he washes the feet of the entire congregation.

In the Syriac Orthodox Church, this service is performed by a bishop or priest. There will be some 12 selected men, both priests and the lay people, and the bishop or priest will wash and kiss the feet of those 12 men. It is not merely a dramatization of the past event. Further it is a prayer where the whole congregation prays to wash and cleanse them of their sins.

=== Anabaptist ===
Groups descending from the 1708 Schwarzenau Brethren, such as the Grace Brethren, Church of the Brethren, Brethren Church, Brethren in Christ, Old German Baptist Brethren, and the Dunkard Brethren regularly practice foot washing (generally called "feetwashing") as one of three ordinances that compose their Lovefeast, the others being the holy kiss, the Eucharist and a fellowship meal. Historically related groups such as the Amish and most Mennonites also wash feet, tracing the practice to the 1632 Dordrecht Confession of Faith. For members, this practice promotes humility towards and care for others, resulting in a higher egalitarianism among members.

=== Moravian ===
The Moravian Church has historically practiced footwashing (pedelavium). This reflected the emphasis Moravians place on practicing customs of the early Church, such as the Lovefeast. In 1818, the practice was made no longer compulsory, though it continues in the present-day. Traditionally, Moravian Christians practiced footwashing before partaking in the Lord's Supper, although in most Moravian congregations, these rites are observed chiefly on Maundy Thursday.

=== Methodist ===
In certain Methodist connexions, such as the Missionary Methodist Church and the New Congregational Methodist Church, feetwashing is practiced at the time that the Lord's Supper is celebrated. In other Methodist denominations, such as the Free Methodist Church and Methodist Protestant Church, feetwashing is practiced on Maundy Thursday, and may be done at other times, such as when General Conference is held. The tradition of the Church of the United Brethren in Christ, one of the ancestors of the United Methodist Church and descendant Global Methodist Church, practices feetwashing when communion is observed; as such, some United Methodist and Global Methodist churches continue this tradition, especially those congregations of Evangelical United Brethren patrimony.

=== Baptist ===
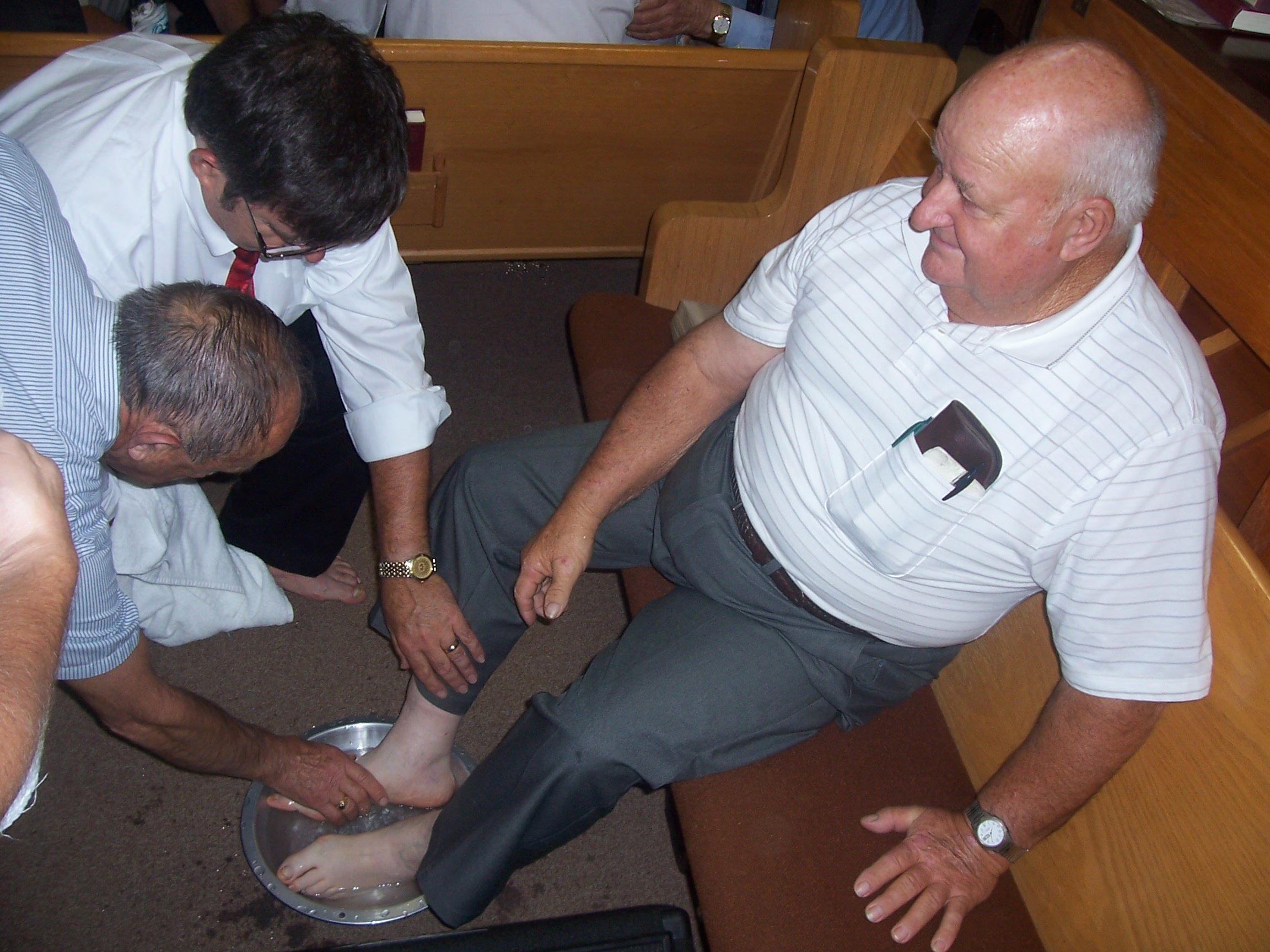
The Friday Night Communion and Foot Washing Service at the Nolynn Association of Separate Baptists in Christ (2009)

Many Baptists observe the literal washing of feet as a third ordinance. The communion and foot washing service is practiced regularly by members of the Separate Baptists in Christ, General Association of Baptists, Free Will Baptists, Primitive Baptists, Union Baptists, Old Regular Baptist, and Christian Baptist Church of God. Feet washing is also practiced as a third ordinance by many Southern Baptists, General Baptists, and Independent Baptists.

=== Pentecostal ===
Various Pentecostal denominations practice the ordinance or ritual of footwashing, in connection with the sacrament of the Lord's Supper or Communion, in the past. Often, foot washing is held as an optional service separate from communion on a different date. When celebrated in conjunction with the Sacrament of the Lord's Supper, or communion, the Pastor, or designated minister, will read the scriptural text, out of the Gospel of St. John, then instruct the men to assemble in one location of the church, and the women to assemble in another location of the church – where basins with water and towels have already been suitably prepared in front of a pew, or row of chairs. Each member takes turns sitting in a chair or pew while another kneels before him or her and washes their feet. Customs may vary. Sometimes the foot washer places both of the other persons feet into the water, scooping water over them with his/her hand, simply holding them, sometimes the feet are held over the basin while water is poured over them, and in some congregations, only one foot is made bare and has water poured over it/washed. Often, the person whose feet are being washed lays a hand/or hands upon the shoulder of the person washing their feet and he or she will pray for the person washing their feet. The foot washer also prays for humility and for the person they are washing. When all have participated in washing the feet of others and having their feet washed, a benediction and dismissal of the service is conducted. Members are often instructed to continue their service to others in the church and to the world at large. After the dismissal, participates usually participate in helping clean up the area, basins, etc.

=== Latter-day Saint Movement ===
In the mid-1830s, Joseph Smith introduced the original temple rites of the Latter Day Saint movement in Kirtland, Ohio, which primarily involved foot washing, followed by speaking in tongues and visions. This foot washing took place exclusively among men, and was based upon the Old and New Testament. After Joseph Smith was initiated into the first three degrees of Freemasonry, this was adapted into the whole body Endowment ritual more similar to contemporary Mormon practice, which shares some similarities to Masonic temple rites, and does not specifically involve the feet. In 1843, Smith included a foot washing element in the faith's second anointing ceremony in which elite married couples are anointed as heavenly monarchs and priests.

The observance of washing the saints' feet is quite varied, but a typical service follows the partaking of unleavened bread and wine. Deacons (in many cases) place pans of water in front of pews that have been arranged for the service. The men and women participate in separate groups, men washing men's feet and women washing women's feet. Each member of the congregation takes a turn washing the feet of another member. Each foot is placed one at a time into the basin of water, is washed by cupping the hand and pouring water over the foot, and is dried with a long towel girded around the waist of the member performing the washing.

=== Restorationist ===
The True Jesus Church includes footwashing as a scriptural sacrament based on John 13:1–11 along with the other two sacraments, Baptism and the Lord's Supper. Members of the church practice footwashing to have a part with Christ (John 13:8).

Most Church of God denominations also include footwashing in their Passover ceremony based on John 13:1–11.

=== Seventh-day Adventist ===
Most Seventh-day Adventist congregations schedule an opportunity for foot washing preceding each quarterly (four times a year) Communion service. As with their "open" Communion, all believers in attendance, not just members or pastors, are invited to share in the washing of feet with another: men with men, women with women, and frequently, spouse with spouse. This service is alternatively called the Ordinance of Foot-Washing or the Ordinance of Humility. Its primary purpose is to renew the cleansing that only comes from Christ, but secondarily to seek and celebrate reconciliation with another member before Communion/the Lord's Supper.

== See also ==
- Christ Washing the Disciples' Feet (Tintoretto)
- Washing of feet and farewell (The Last Supper in Christian Art)
- Water and religion
- Ablution in Christianity
