= Agape feast =

Communal meal shared among Christians

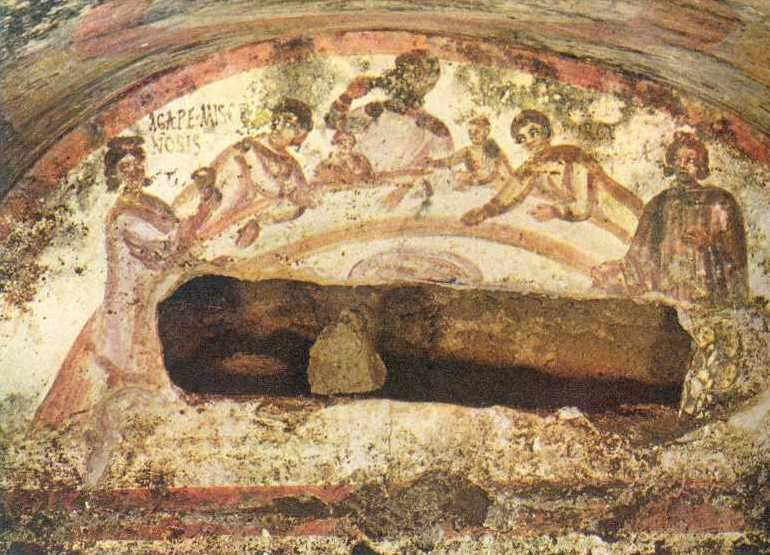
Fresco of a banquet (Note: The word Agape in the inscription has led some to interpret the scene as that of an agape feast. However, the phrase within which the word appears is "Agape misce nobis" ('Agape, mix for us', i.e., prepare the wine for us), making it more likely that Agape is the name of a woman holding the cup. A very similar fresco and inscription elsewhere in the same catacomb has, in exactly the same position within the fresco, the words "Misce mi Irene" ('Mix for me, Irene'). A reproduction of this other fresco can be seen at Catacombe dei Ss. Marcellino e Pietro, where it is accompanied by the explanation (in Italian) "One of the most frequently recurring scenes in the painting is that of the banquet, generally interpreted as a symbolic representation of the joys of afterlife, but in which it may be possible to discern a realistic presentation of the agapae, the funeral banquets held to commemorate the dead person." An article by Carlo Carletti on L'Osservatore Romano of 1 November 2009 recalls that the same catacomb has in fact a whole series of similar frescos of banquets with men reclining at a banquet and calling on a maid to serve them wine. The names Agape and Irene were common among slaves and freedwomen at the time, but the fact that these particular names reoccur twelve times in the catacomb suggests that they were chosen not just as names for the maids but to evoke the ideas that the two names signify: love and peace.) at a tomb in the Catacomb of Saints Marcellinus and Peter, Via Labicana, Rome.

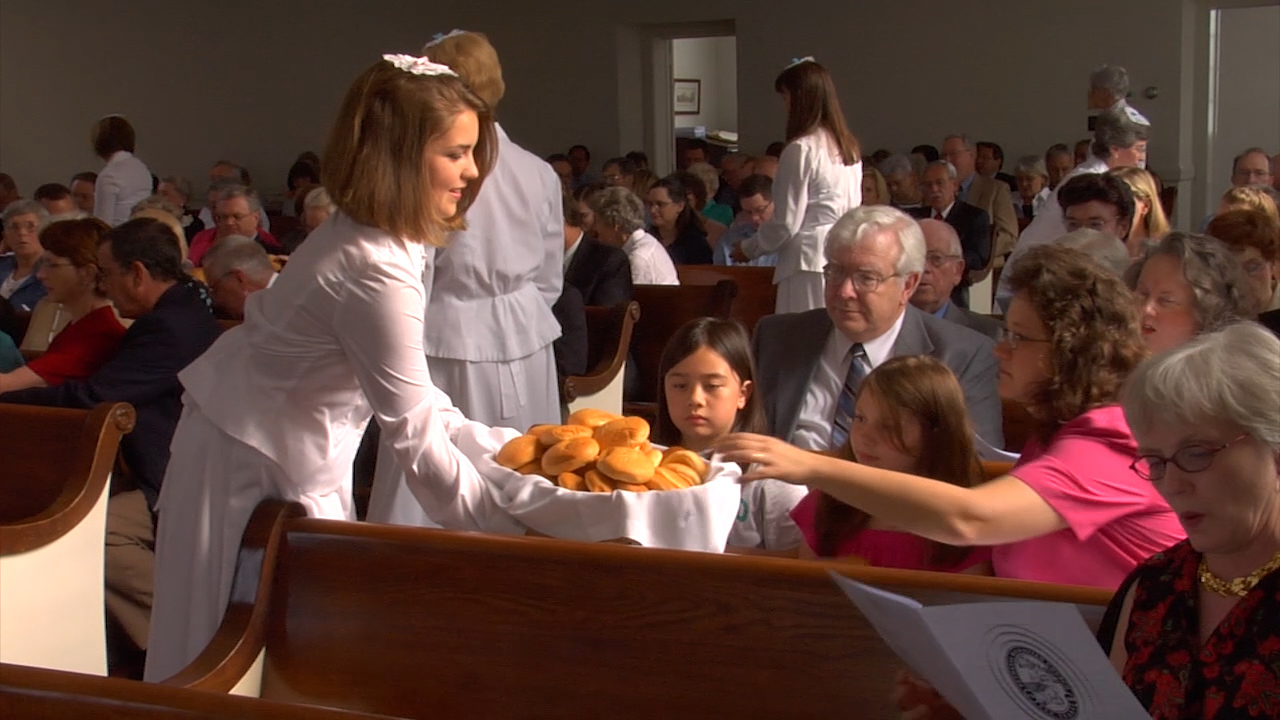
A Moravian diener serves bread to fellow members of her congregation during the celebration of a lovefeast at Bethania Moravian Church in North Carolina.

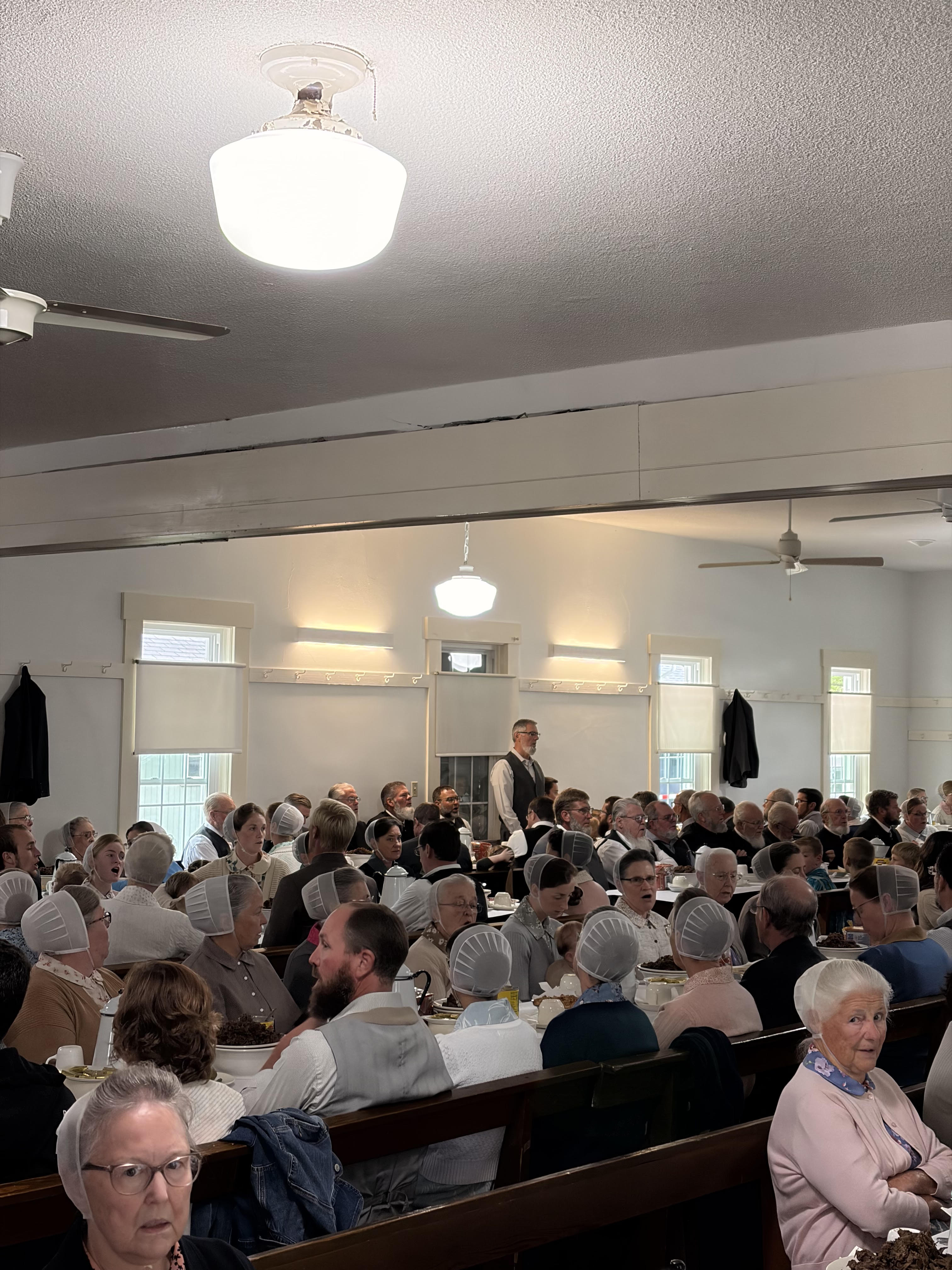
A Schwarzenau Brethren celebration of the lovefeast at the Bear Creek Congregation of the Old German Baptist Brethren Church, New Conference

An agape feast or lovefeast (Note: Also spelled love feast or love-feast, sometimes capitalized) is a kind of communal meal shared among Christians. The name comes from the Greek word ἀγάπη (agape), which implies the highest form of love described in the New Testament.

Agape feasts originated in the early Church and were a time of fellowship for believers. The Eucharist used to be also present during the lovefeasts in the earliest times, although at some point, beginning in the latter 1st century AD and 250 AD, the Eucharist was separated from it. Thus, in modern retrievalist celebrations of the agape feasts tradition, terms such as "Lovefeast" refer to meals distinct from the Eucharist. Such lovefeasts, celebrated within the Eastern Orthodox tradition and also in pietistic traditions, seek to strengthen fraternal bonds between parishioners.

The practice of sharing an "agape" meal is mentioned in Jude 1:12 and has been said to be a "common meal of the early church". References to these communal meals are found in 1 Corinthians 11:17–34 and in Saint Ignatius of Antioch's Letter to the Smyrnaeans, where the term agape is used, and in a letter from Pliny the Younger to Trajan, (ca. 111 AD) in which he reported that the Christians, after having met "on a stated day" in the early morning to "address a form of prayer to Christ, as to a divinity", would "reassemble, to eat in common a harmless meal" later in the day. Similar communal meals are also mentioned in the Coptic tradition–often identified as the Apostolic tradition attributed to Hippolytus of Rome, who does not use the term agape–and in works of Tertullian, who does. The connection between such substantial meals and the Eucharist had virtually ceased by the time of Cyprian (who died 258 AD), when the Eucharist was celebrated with fasting in the morning and the agape in the evening. The Synod of Gangra in 340 AD makes mention of lovefeasts in relation to a heretic who had barred his followers from attending them.

Though still mentioned in the Quinisext Council of 692 AD, the agape meal fell into disuse soon after, except among the churches in Ethiopia and India. At the end of the 18th century, the Carmelite friar Paolino da San Bartolomeo reported that the ancient Saint Thomas Christians of India still celebrated the lovefeast, using their typical dish called appam. In addition, Radical Pietist groups originating in the eighteenth century, such as the Schwarzenau Brethren and the Moravian Church, celebrate the lovefeast. Methodist Churches also continue the practice.

Similar Christian communal meals have been revived or created more recently among other denominations, including Anglicanism, as well as the American house church movement. The modern lovefeast has often been used in ecumenical settings, such as between Methodists and Anglicans.

== History ==
=== Early Christianity ===
The earliest reference to a meal of the type referred to as agape is in Paul the Apostle's First Epistle to the Corinthians, although the term can only be inferred vaguely from its prominence in 1 Cor 13. Many New Testament scholars hold that the Christians of Corinth met in the evening and had a common meal including sacramental action over bread and wine. 1 Corinthians 11:20–34 indicates that the rite was associated with participation in a meal of a more general character. It apparently involved a full meal, with the participants bringing their own food but eating in a common room. Perhaps predictably enough, it could at times deteriorate into merely an occasion for eating and drinking, or for ostentatious displays by the wealthier members of the community, as happened in Corinth, drawing the criticisms of Paul:

"I hear that when you come together as a church, there are divisions among you, and to some extent I believe it. No doubt there have to be differences among you to show which of you have God's approval. When you come together, it is not the Lord's Supper you eat, for as you eat, each of you goes ahead without waiting for anybody else. One remains hungry, another gets drunk. Don't you have homes to eat and drink in? Or do you despise the church of God and humiliate those who have nothing?"

The term agape (ἀγάπη) is also used in reference to meals in Jude 1:12 and in a few manuscripts of 2 Peter 2:13.

Soon after the year 100 AD, Ignatius of Antioch refers to the agape feast. In Letter 97 to Trajan in 112 AD, Pliny the Younger mentions that Christians are known to assemble for a common meal which may be the agape meal: The rescheduling of the agape meal was triggered by Corinthian selfishness and gluttony. Tertullian too seems to write of these meals, though what he describes is not quite clear.

Clement of Alexandria (c. 150–211/216 AD) distinguished so-called agape meals of luxurious character from the agape (love) "which the food that comes from Christ shows that we ought to partake of". Accusations of gross indecency were sometimes made against the more indulgent banquets. Referring to Clement of Alexandria's Stromata (III, 2), Philip Schaff commented: "The early disappearance of the Christian agapæ may probably be attributed to the terrible abuse of the word here referred to, by the licentious Carpocratians. The genuine agapæ were of apostolic origin (2 Pet. ii. 13; Jude 12), but were often abused by hypocrites, even under the apostolic eye (1 Corinthians 11:21). In the Gallican Church, a survival or relic of these feasts of charity is seen in the pain béni; and, in the Eastern Orthodox Church in the ἀντίδωρον (antidoron) or eulogiæ, also known as prosphora distributed to non-communicants at the close of the Divine Liturgy (Eucharist), from the loaf out of which the Lamb (Host) and other portions have been cut during the Liturgy of Preparation."

Augustine of Hippo also objected to meals in his native North Africa, typically in funerary or commemorative settings, in which some indulged to the point of drunkenness, and he distinguished them from proper celebration of the Eucharist: "Let us take the body of Christ in communion with those with whom we are forbidden to eat even the bread which sustains our bodies." He reports that even before the time of his stay in Milan, the custom had already been forbidden there.

Canons 27 and 28 of the Council of Laodicea (364) restricted the abuses of taking home part of the provisions and of holding the meals in churches. The Third Council of Carthage (393) and the Second Council of Orléans (541) (Note: Several sources mention a prohibition of the agape by the Second Council of Orleans in AD 541. More numerous are the sources (which do not speak of the agape) that put the Second Council of Orleans in AD 533.) reiterated the prohibition of feasting in churches, and the Trullan Council of 692 decreed that honey and milk were not to be offered on the altar (Canon 57), and that those who held love feasts in churches should be excommunicated (Canon 74).

The ancient Saint Thomas Christians of India continued to celebrate their agapa feasts, using their typical dish called appam.

=== Medieval Georgia ===
In the medieval Georgian Orthodox Church, the term agapi referred to a commemorative meal or distribution of victuals, offered to clergymen, the poor, or passers-by, accompanying the funeral service on the anniversary of the deceased. The permanent celebration of these meals was assured by legacies and foundations.

=== Reformation ===
After the Protestant Reformation there was a move amongst some groups of Christians to try to return to the practices of the New Testament Church. One such group was the Schwarzenau Brethren (1708) who counted a Love Feast consisting of feet washing, the agape meal, and the Eucharist among their "outward yet sacred" ordinances. Another was the Moravians led by Count Zinzendorf who adopted a form consisting of the sharing of a simple meal, and then testimonies or a devotional address were given and letters from missionaries read.

John Wesley, the founder of Methodism, travelled to America in the company of Moravians and greatly admired their faith and practice. After his conversion in 1738 he introduced the Love Feast to what became known as the Methodist movement. Due to the lack of ordained ministers within Methodism, the Love Feast took on a life of its own, as there were very few opportunities to take Holy Communion. As such, the Primitive Methodists celebrated the Love Feast, before it lessened in the nineteenth century as the revival cooled.

== Practice by denomination ==
=== Oriental Orthodox ===
At least some of the Oriental Orthodox churches continue the tradition of this meal, including the Saint Thomas Christians of India. Their Lovefeasts are attended by individuals who travel great distances for it, and are presided over by a priest. They are often held when a new priest is ordained, and those in attendance bring gifts for him. The Ethiopian Orthodox Church has also continued to celebrate the agape feast, which is held every Saturday, and many Coptic Orthodox churches celebrate it as well.

=== Brethren ===
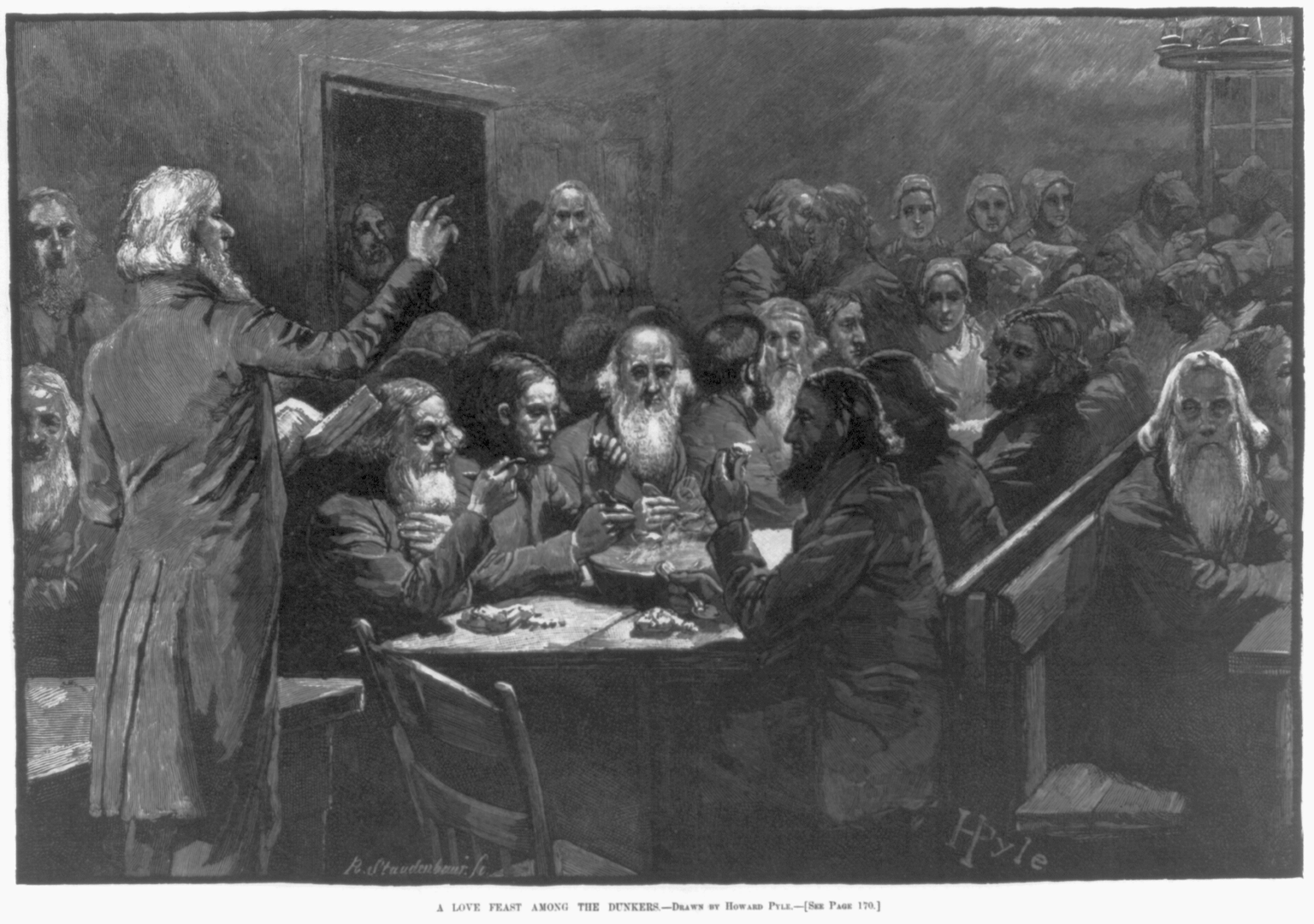
Traditional Love Feast among the Schwarzenau Brethren, 1883.

The Schwarzenau Brethren groups (the largest being the Church of the Brethren) regularly practice agape feasts (called "Love Feasts"), which include feetwashing, a supper, and communion, with hymns and brief scriptural meditations interspersed throughout the worship service.

Groups that descend from the Schwarzenau Brethren such as the Church of the Brethren, Brethren Church, Old German Baptist Brethren, and Dunkard Brethren regularly practice a Lovefeast based on New Testament descriptions of the Last Supper of Christ. The Grace Brethren, an offshoot of the Schwarzenau Brethren, also practices the lovefeast. The Brethren combine the Agape meal (often consisting of lamb or beef and a bowl of soup) with a service of feetwashing before the meal and communion afterward. The term "Lovefeast" in this case generally refers to all three ordinances, not just the meal. Influenced by German Radical Pietists during the early eighteenth century, the Lovefeast was instituted among Brethren before Moravians adopted the practice.

=== Moravian ===
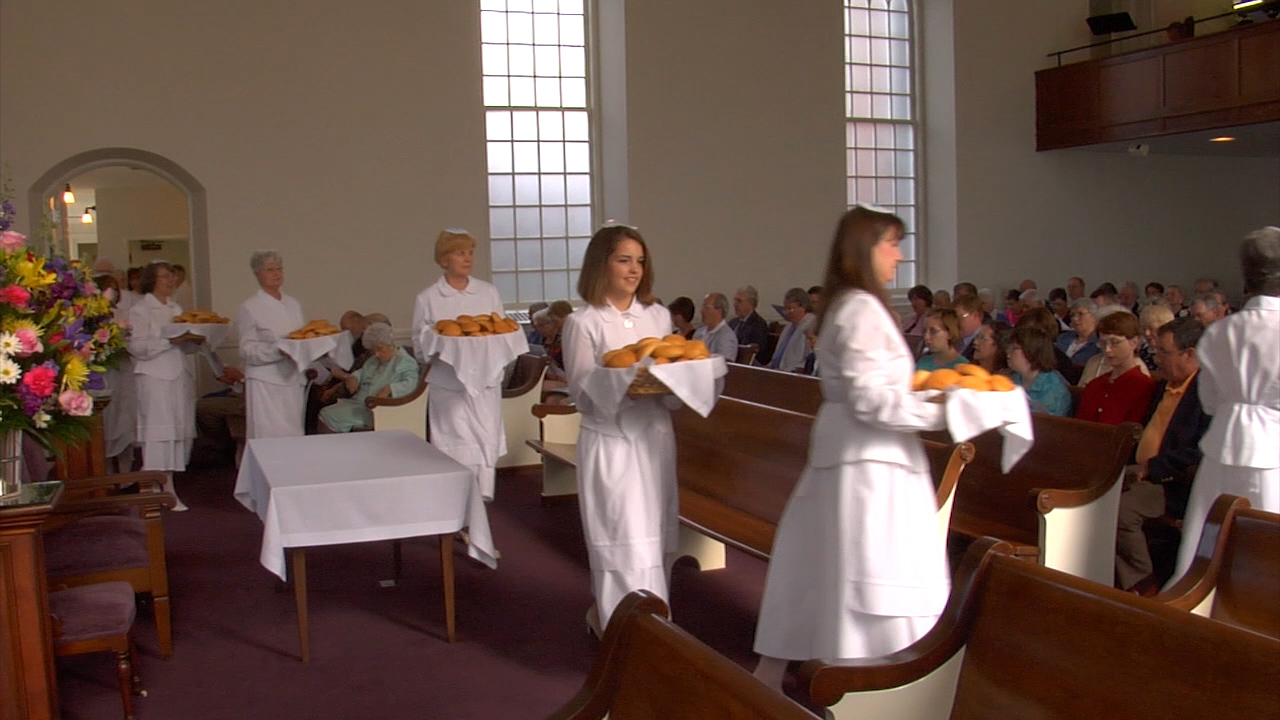
Moravian dieners serve bread to fellow members of their congregation during the celebration of the lovefeast at Bethania Moravian Church in North Carolina.

The lovefeast of the Moravian Church is based on the Agape feast and the meals of the early churches described in the Bible in the Acts of the Apostles, which were partaken in unity and love. Traditionally for European, Canadian, and American lovefeasts, a sweetened bun and coffee (sweetened milky tea in Germany, the Netherlands, and England) is served to the congregation in the pews by dieners (from the German for 'servers'); before partaking, a simple table grace is said. The foods and drinks consumed by the congregation may vary according what is available. Services in some Colonial-era lovefeasts, for example, used plain bread and water.

The Moravian lovefeast also concentrates on the singing of hymns and listening to music, which may come from the organ or choir. The songs and hymns chosen usually describe love and harmony. The congregation can talk quietly with their fellow brothers and sisters in Christ about their spiritual walk with God. Christmas Eve lovefeasts can become particularly spectacular in the congregation's choice of music and instrumentation. Many churches have trombone choirs or church bands play before a lovefeast as a call to service.

A Moravian congregation may hold a lovefeast on any special occasion, such as the date their church was founded, but there are certain established dates that Lovefeasts are regularly observed. Some of these notable dates include New Year's Eve (on which the Watchnight service is observed), Good Friday, the Festival of 13 August (the 1727 date on which the Moravian Church was renewed), and Christmas Eve, where each member of the congregation receives a lighted candle at the end of the service in addition to the bun and coffee.

=== Methodist ===
Methodists also practice lovefeasts, often quarterly, as well as on the evenings of major feast days. They are also held during camp meetings. In Methodist theology, lovefeasts are a "means of grace" and "converting ordinance" that John Wesley believed to be an apostolic institution. One account from July 1776 expounded on attendees' experiences of new birth and entire sanctification at a lovefeast:

We held our general love-feast. It began between eight and nine on Wednesday morning, and continued till noon. Many testified that they had 'redemption in the blood of Jesus, even the forgiveness of sins.' And many were enabled to declare that it had 'cleansed them from all sin.' So clear, so full, so strong was their testimony that while some were speaking their experience hundreds were in tears, and others vehemently crying to God for pardon or holiness. About eight our watch-night began. Mr. J. preached an excellent sermon: the rest of the preachers exhorted and prayed with divine energy. Surely, for the work wrought on these two days, many will praise God to all eternity

The liturgy for a lovefeast traditionally includes the following elements:

- Hymn
- Prayer
- Grace (sung)
- Bread distributed by stewards
- Collection for the poor
- Circulation of the loving-cup
- Address by the presiding minister
- Testimonies and verses of hymns
- Closing exhortation by the minister
- Hymn
- Benediction

In certain Methodist connexions, such as the Missionary Methodist Church and the New Congregational Methodist Church, footwashing is practiced too.

In the Wesleyan Methodist Church, lovefeasts consisted of bread and water that filled the loving-cup. These lovefeasts were said to "promote piety, mutual affection and zeal". Unlike the Eucharist in the Methodist tradition, lovefeasts are traditionally fenced, being only for members of Methodist churches, though non-members are permitted to attend once. Several Methodist hymns were written for this Christian ritual, including Charles Wesley's "The Love-Feast", penned in 1740:

Come and let us sweetly join
Christ to praise in hymns divine;
Give we all, with one accord.
Glory to our common Lord.
Hands and hearts and voices raise;
Sing as in the ancient days;
Antedate the joys above,
Celebrate the feast of love.

The Christian liturgical books of the African Methodist Episcopal Church, African Methodist Episcopal Zion Church, Christian Methodist Episcopal Church, and United Methodist Church all have services for the Lovefeast.

Congregations of the Primitive Methodist Church hold Lovefeasts in the form of large potluck-style meals among members of their congregations.

¶108 of the Discipline of the Evangelical Wesleyan Church states that "A Love feast shall be held on each circuit at least once in three months. It shall ordinarily consist of bread-breaking, praise, and testimony."

¶244 of the Discipline of the Allegheny Wesleyan Methodist Connection stipulates that one of the duties of pastors is "to hold love-feasts".

=== Eastern Orthodox ===
A number of Eastern Orthodox Christian parishes will have an agape meal (Turkish: sevgi ziyafeti), commonly known as coffee hour (Spanish: café comunitario), on Sundays and feast days following the Divine Liturgy, and especially at the conclusion of the Paschal Vigil.

=== Roman Catholic ===
The agape is a common feature used by the Catholic Neocatechumenal Way in which members of the Way participate in a light feast after the celebration of the Eucharist on certain occasions. Otherwise, there is a strong tradition of love-feasts only occasionally called "agape" and with a lot of local specifics: Big festivals, like a parish's patron saint or Corpus Christi, are usually celebrated with a parish festival with a lot of food and drink. Otherwise, while Americans have a "coffee and doughnuts" tradition after the Sunday Mass, and while the early-morning Rorate Mass is usually followed by a communal breakfast, most parishes restrict themselves to attend, as a group, a local restaurant, café or pub. A holy hour, for instance, is usually followed by a "happy hour". (This is also where the German Frühschoppen tradition comes from.) Probably the principal way to celebrate the love-feast (usually without doing so intentionally) is the festive Sunday family dinner.

=== Adventist ===
The Creation Seventh Day Adventists partake of an agape feast as a part of their New Moon observances, taking the form of a formal, all-natural meal held after the communion supper.

== Bibliography ==
- "Lovefeast". Moravian.org. The Moravian Church in North America. Archived from the original on 18 May 2012.
- Bowman, Carl F. Brethren Society: The Cultural Transformation of a Peculiar People. Baltimore: Johns Hopkins University Press.
- Stutzman, Paul Fike. Recovering the Love Feast: Broadening Our Eucharistic Celebrations. Eugene, Oregon: Wipf and Stock, 2011.
- "Love Feasts as the Center of the Church Life: by Charles Debelak".
