= Christian Congregation (Restoration Movement) =

- Classification: Protestant
- Theology: Universalist
- Governance: Congregationalist
- Founder: Barton Warren Stone, John Chapman, John L. Puckett, Isaac V. Smith
- Origin: 1798; Ohio River Valley
- Congregations: 1,496
- Members: 122,181
- Official website: http://www.netministries.org/see/churches.exe/ch10619

The Christian Congregation is an evangelical non-denominational and non-creedal church that began as an informal evangelistic organization along the Ohio River Valley in 1798 by followers of Barton Warren Stone and his Restoration Movement. Some sources cite Stone as the actual founder. Its church governance is Congregationalist in structure. While never intending to formally establish a church, the Christian Congregation, nevertheless, established its first formally organized congregation when former ministers of the Christian Church in Kokomo, Indiana, John L. Puckett, John Chapman, and Isaac V. Smith, desiring to unite with the movement on a non-creedal and non-denominational basis, incorporated the Christian Congregation in the State of Indiana in 1887.

The church charter was revised in 1898 and on October 18 of that year, the church was reincorporated under the new charter. Although Puckett, Chapman, and Smith, were responsible for the formal organization of the Christian Congregation, Puckett is considered the actual founder. The first official congregation was founded by Puckett in Kokomo. Puckett not only founded the congregation but served as its pastor. Under Puckett's leadership, the congregation purchased the Spice Run Cemetery in Kokomo for the purpose of providing a burial place for paupers changing the name to Christian Congregation Church Cemetery and eventually Puckett Cemetery.

Remaining faithful to the Restoration Movement's non-creedal position, the Christian Congregation adopted John 13:34-25, "A new commandment I give to you, that you love one another, even as I have loved you, that you also love one another. By this all men will know that you are My disciples, if you have love for one another," as a philosophical and theological statement giving testimony that the church is founded not upon doctrinal agreement, creeds, church claims, names, or rites, but solely upon the individual's relationship with Jesus Christ. Taking this philosophy seriously, Puckett's congregation not only provided free burials in their cemetery but also demonstrated the love of Christ by providing for members of the congregation who experienced medical emergencies, financial hardships, food and clothing needs, or other hardships. Detailed and accurate records were kept to avoid abuse of the system.

The basis of this Christian fellowship is love toward one another specifically demonstrated in the fact that the Christian Congregation was the first Restoration Movement church body that had accredited female ministers serving as pastors: May Puckett-Foster and Ida Wygants. The theological persuasion of the church is Universalist. Ethically activated, this philosophy has led to a central emphasis upon respect for all life. The Christian Congregation is opposed to abortion, capital punishment, and war. With love being its central tenet and belief that Christ's church transcends all national and racial boundaries, the Christian Congregation has within its ranks a wide range of beliefs that ranges from fundamentalists and Pentecostals to liberals and humanists. Consequently, no representative statements can be made regarding God, Jesus, sin, salvation, and the Bible. The church is governed by a General Superintendent and a board of trustees.

Relationships between the governing body and the congregations are purely advisory. Congregations are mostly located in Kentucky, North and South Carolina, Virginia, Pennsylvania, Ohio, Indiana, Tennessee, and Texas. Ministers and laity may also refer to themselves as Disciples of Christ reflecting roots in the Restoration Movement. For many years the church was headquartered in La Follette, Tennessee with The Rev. Dr. Ora Wilbert Eads, who was also a Unitarian-Universalist minister, serving as General Superintendent. Dr. Eads assumed the role after the death of the former General Superintendent O. J. Read in 1961 until his own death in 2008. Due to the loose structure of the church, formal organization temporarily ceased to exist and attempts are currently being made to restructure the church under the leadership of Wayne Eads. The current website is temporary until restructure.

Expressing concern regarding its future and lack of activity since Dr. Eads' passing, a small group of Christian Congregation ministers continues the evangelistic labors of Stone, Chapman, Puckett, and Smith as the Christian Congregation (Disciples of Christ) furthering the original mission and vision of a Restoration Movement, non-creedal church body embracing the following Five Cardinal Principles of early Restoration Movement leaders:

- Jesus Christ is the only Head of the Church
- The Holy Bible is sufficient for faith and practice
- The right of private judgment and the liberty of conscience
- Christian character the only test for church membership
- Christian unity

== See also ==
- Christian Congregation (Pentecostal)
