= Christian Congregation in Ireland =

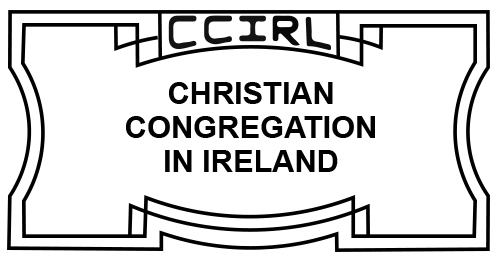
- Classification: Protestant
- Theology: Pentecostal
- Governance: Congregationalist
- Origin: 2004
- Members: 390
- Official website: http://www.ccirl.ie

The Christian Congregation in Ireland is a non-sectarian, non-denominational fellowship of assemblies with roots in the Italian Pentecostal revival in Chicago, United States of America, which began in 1907, as part of the larger Christian Congregation (Pentecostal).

Doctrinally holds the Bible as fount of faith and guidance for life; believes Jesus Christ as the only Savior whose atonement work dispenses the saving Grace; practices the adult water baptism and holy supper.

Currently, the church in Ireland has 5 houses of worship and approximately three hundred and ninety members. This fellowship of churches under the present name besides having affiliated churches in about fifty countries, with approximately 3 million members, 2.5 million being in Brazil.
