= Christian Congregation (Pentecostal) =

Religious organization

- Classification: Protestant
- Theology: Finished Work Pentecostal
- Governance: Congregationalist
- Full communion: Assemblies of God in Italy; Canadian Assemblies of God; International Fellowship of Christian Assemblies
- Origin: 1907
- Members: 5 million
- Official website: christiancongregationintheworld.org

The Christian Congregation is an international non-denominational fellowship of assemblies with roots in the Italian Pentecostal revival in Chicago, which began in 1907. It can be found, for example, in Brazil, Argentina, Paraguay, the United States, Mozambique, Italy, Portugal and Ireland. There are approximately 3 million members, 2.5 million being in Brazil.

== History ==
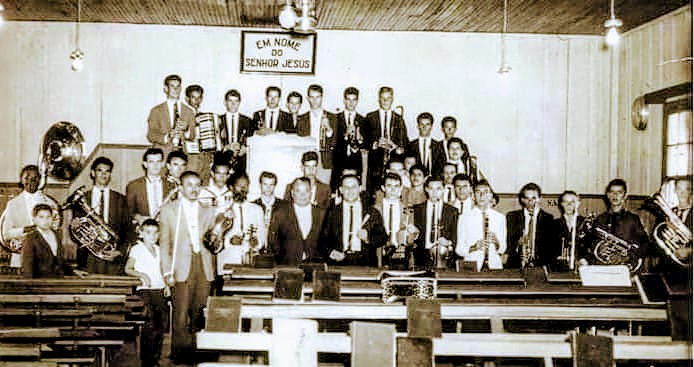
Musicians of the Christian Congregation, in Telêmaco Borba, Paraná, Brazil (1950).

In 1907, several groups of Italian evangelicals were brought together in Chicago. Initially, they began to gather in their homes, devoid of any denomination and without any propaganda or a particular form of communication. Followed, encouraging pioneers like Louis Francescon, Rosina Balzano, Pietro Ottolini, Giacomo Lombardi, Lucia de Francesco Menna, Luigi Terragnoli, Umberto Garrazzi, Agostino Lencioni, Pietro Menconi, Giovanni Perrou and many others, to evangelize in the United States. Also abroad as in Canada, Italy, Argentina and Brazil. Consequently, many churches were founded in those places. In September 1908 Giacomo Lombardi went on a mission to Italy, where he started the movement over there. In 1909 Lombardi, Lucia Menna and Louis Francescon departed for Buenos Aires, evangelizing Michelangelo Menna and family in the countryside of that province. March 8, 1910, Louis Francescon and Giacomo Lombardi left Buenos Aires and went to São Paulo, Brazil. On April 18 Francescon left for Santo Antônio da Platina city and Lombardi returned to Buenos Aires. In order to keep fellowship and maintain an orderly progress, in April 1927, a convention of various congregations was held in Niagara Falls and the 12 Articles of Faith were adopted. Currently, the Christian Congregation is a multiethnic body, with the preaching of biblical Christianity, sharing communion with churches of like doctrine around the globe and having sister churches in all continents. In 2003, the International Convention of Christian Congregations was celebrated, establishing common principles of ecclesiastical management, however, with no national organization prevailing over the other.

== Doctrine ==
Doctrinally holds the Bible as fount of faith and guidance for life; believes Jesus Christ as the only Savior whose atonement work dispenses the saving Grace; practices the adult water baptism and holy supper.

== International fellowship ==
In 1980 the various fellowships of the Christian Congregations came together through elders, like Miguel Spina.

=== United States ===
Christian Congregation in the United States
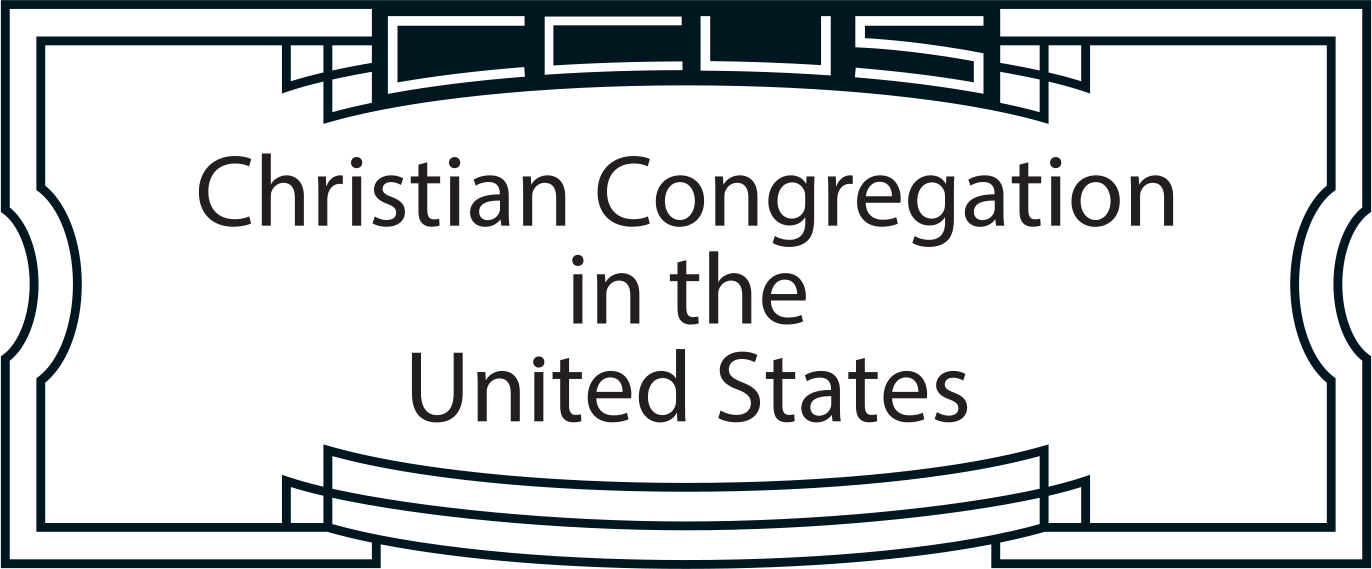
- Governance: Congregationalist
- Origin: 1980 (organized)
- Members: 2,900
- Official website: ccus.org

Currently, the church in the United States has approximately seventy houses of worship and two thousand nine hundred members. This fellowship of churches under the present name began to hold yearly meetings in 1980 and it has no headquarters, but convenes yearly in rotation basis in Arlington Heights; Illinois, Alhambra, California; and Snyder, near to Buffalo, New York. It has affiliated churches in Canada and Mexico.

== Gallery ==
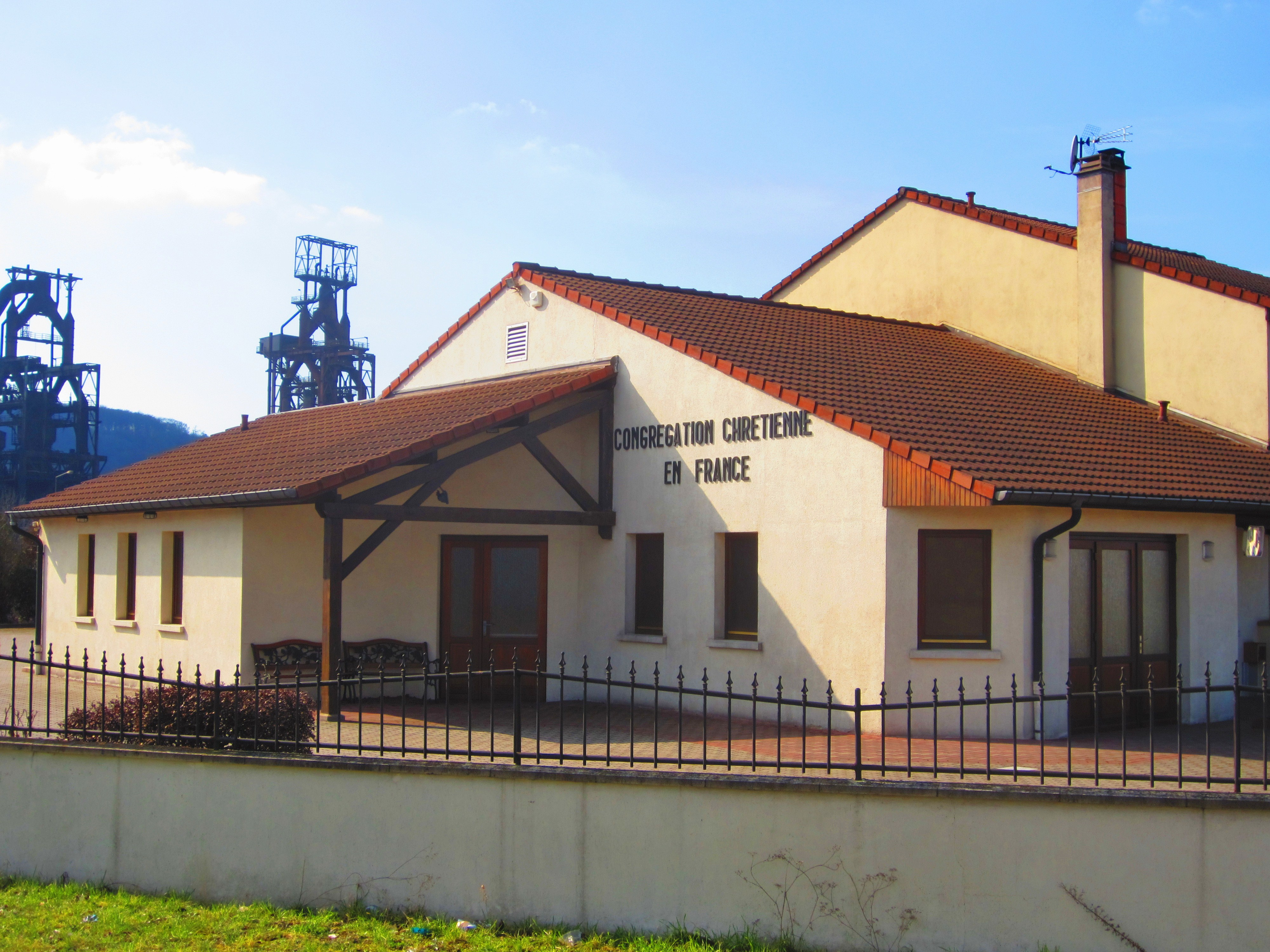
Christian Congregation in France, in Hayange.

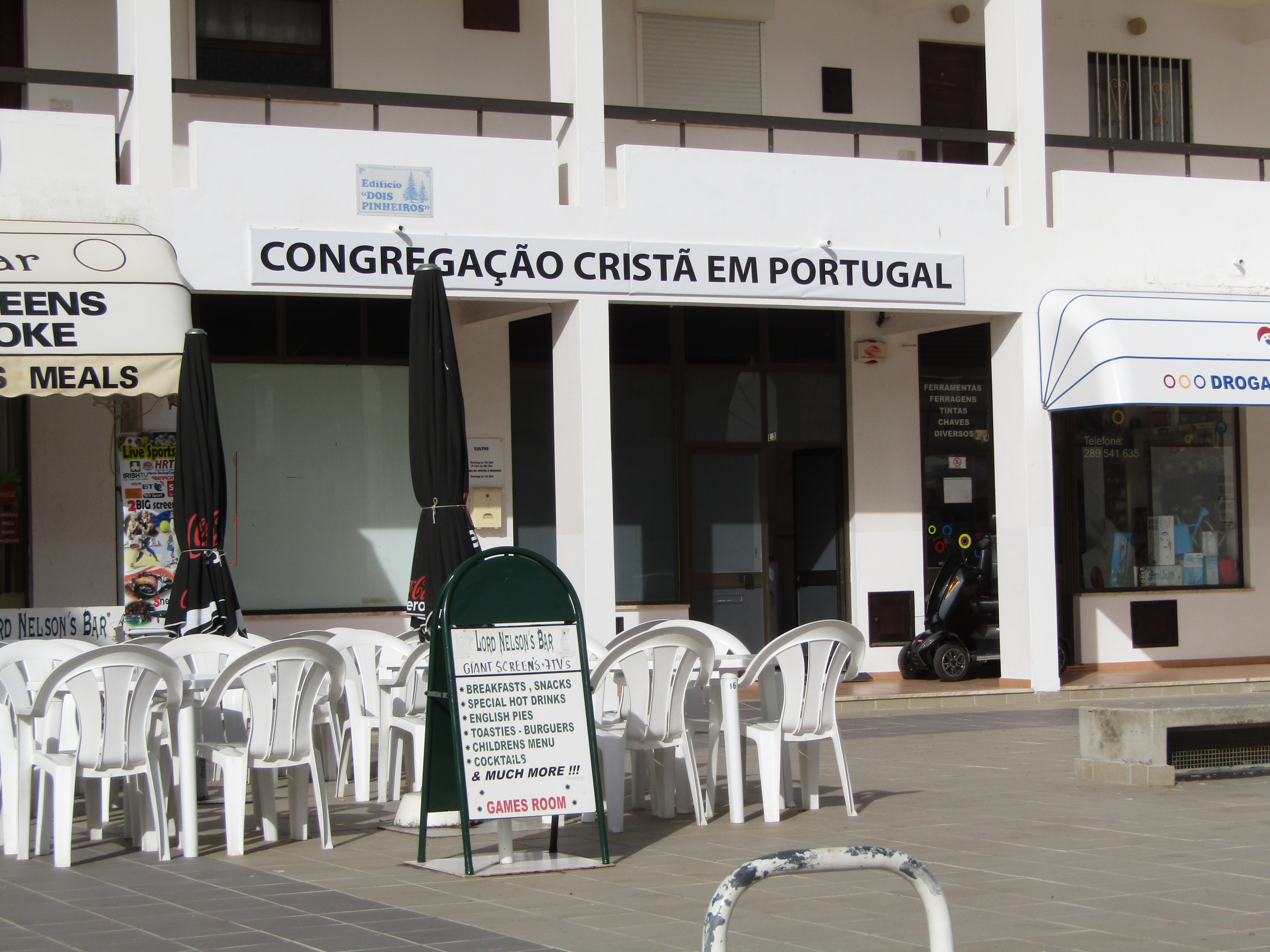
Christian Congregation in Portugal, in Albufeira.

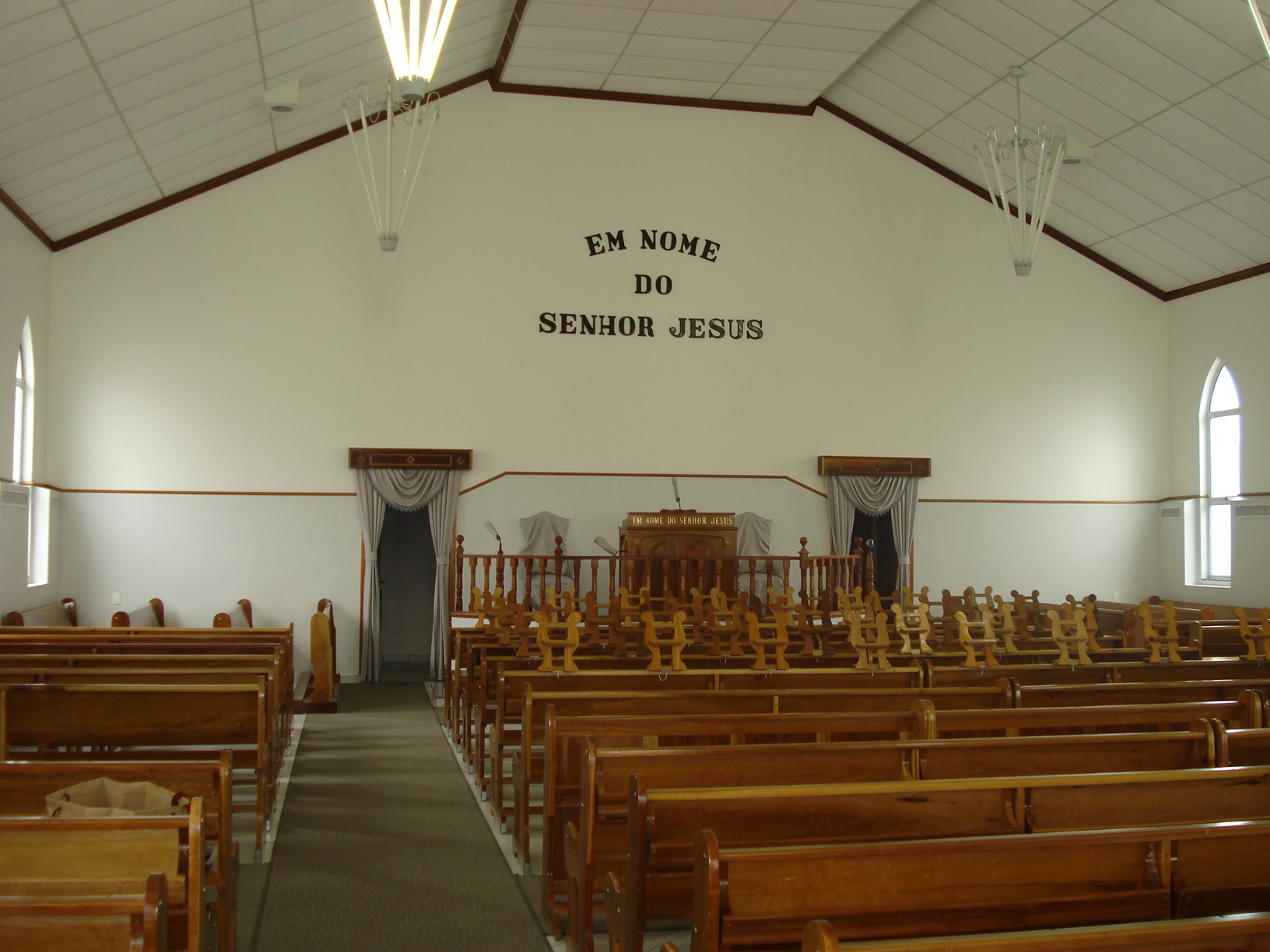
Christian Congregation in Brazil, in Santo André.

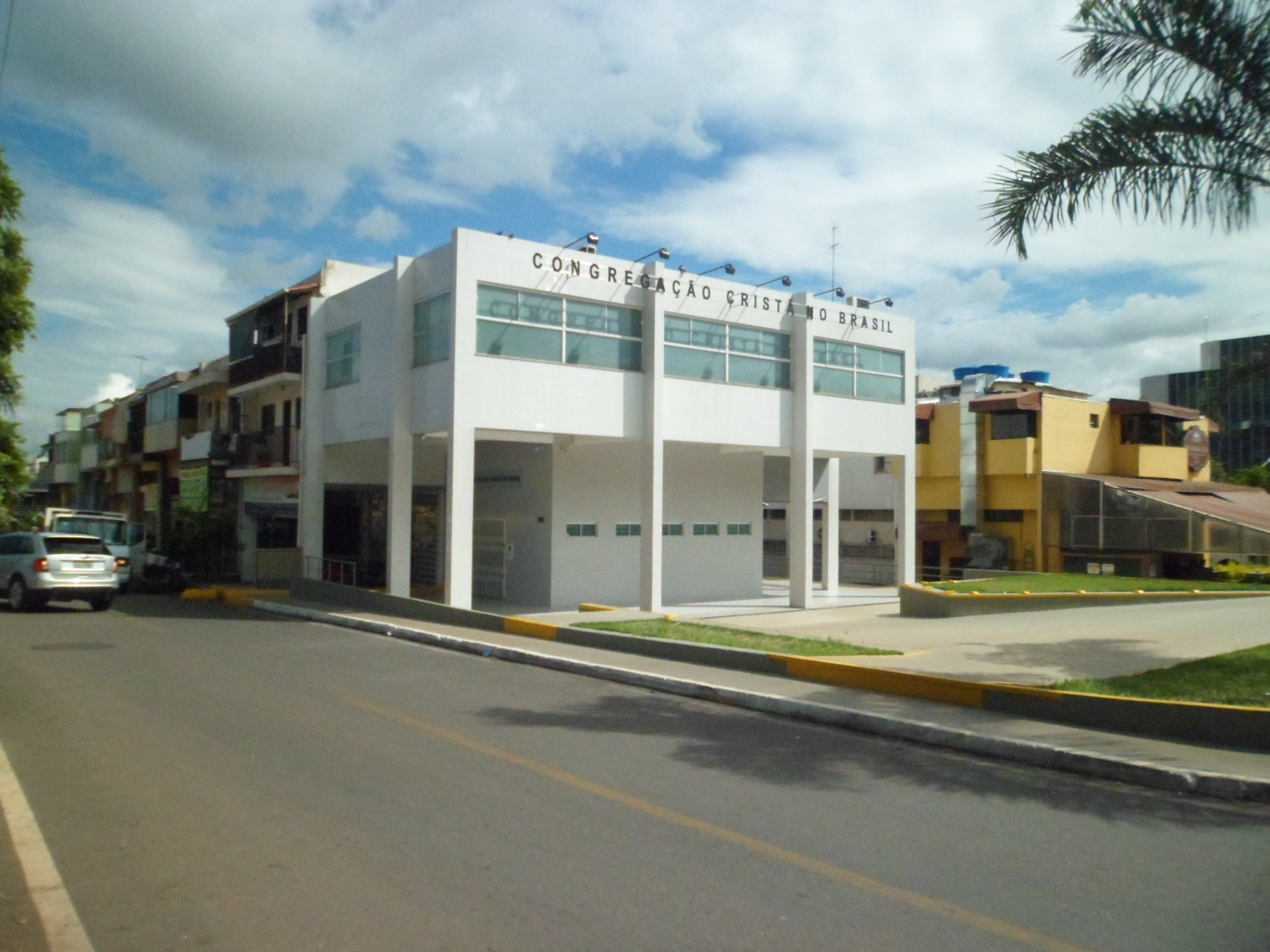
Christian Congregation in Brazil, in Brasília.

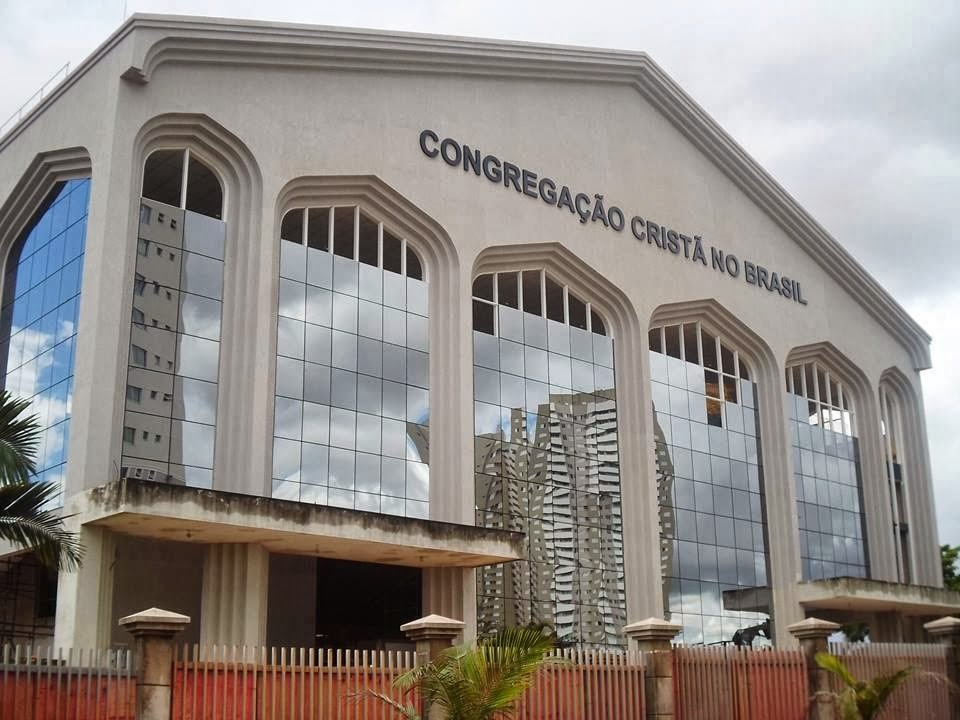
Christian Congregation in Brazil, in Goiânia.

== See also ==
- Christian Congregation in Brazil
- Christian Congregation (Restoration Movement)

== Bibliography ==
- Alves, Leonardo M. Christian Congregation in North America: Its Inception, Doctrine, and Worship. Dallas, 2006.
