= Missionary Methodist Church =

Methodist Christian denomination

- Classification: Methodism
- Orientation: Holiness movement
- Theology: Wesleyan-Arminian
- Polity: Connexionalism
- Separated from: Wesleyan Methodist Church (1913)
- Congregations: 14
- Official website: www.mmc-oa.org

The Missionary Methodist Church is a Methodist denomination in the holiness movement.

The foundation of the Missionary Methodist Church is part of the history of Methodism in the United States. In 1913, a schism occurred in the Wesleyan Methodist Church over the issues of tithing, women's ordination, and the wearing of jewelry. Leading the formation of the Missionary Methodist Church in Forest City, North Carolina, was H. C. Sisk (1866–1945).

The Missionary Methodist connexion, which has fourteen churches, holds an annual camp meeting at Poarch Chapel Missionary Methodist Church.
