= Cavey =

Cavey may refer to:

- Bruxy Cavey (born 1965), Canadian pastor and author
- John M. Cavey (1907–1982), American politician and lawyer
- Captain Caveman, a fictional character nicknamed "Cavey"
- Cavey Jr, the son of Captain Caveman
