= Niagara Christian Community of Schools =

Private school in Ontario, Canada

Niagara Christian Collegiate

Location
- 2619 Niagara River Pkwy; Fort Erie, Ontario; Fort Erie, Ontario, L2A 5M4; Canada

Information
- Type: middle, secondary
- Established: 1932
- School district: Ontario
- Principal: Meredyth Campbell
- Grades: Grade 6–12
- Student to teacher ratio: 8:1
- Colours: Blue and White
- Mascot: Navigator
- Newspaper: The Collegian
- Yearbook: Niagara Torch
- Website: www.niagaracc.com

Niagara Christian Collegiate (NCC) is a private school located on a 122-acre campus on the banks of the Niagara River, just outside Fort Erie, Ontario, Canada. The school was founded in 1932 by the Brethren in Christ Church, an Anabaptist denomination that emerged from the Radical Pietistic movement. The site it is now situated on was bought in 1938. The purchase (included 122 acres (0.49 km^{2}) and Belmont Hall) was for $13,000.

NCC is a ministry-inspected private school that grants the Ontario Secondary School Diploma (OSSD). The curriculum for students in grades 6 through 12 focuses on a holistic educational approach, with a student-teacher ratio of 8:1 and individualized attention from its Christian faculty. The school offers traditional day-student programs, full dormitory boarding, and homestay options during the academic year, as well as summer programs and camps.

Approximately half of NCC's student body consists of international students, representing over 15 countries, including Brazil, China, Ghana, Hong Kong, Japan, Mexico, Nigeria, Rwanda, Taiwan, Tunisia, the UK, and the United States. This international component has been a part of the school's enrollment since 1969, fostering a diverse and multicultural environment.

== History ==
=== Early Years and Foundation ===
The Belmont Club House was built in Fort Erie, Ontario, between 1926 and 1927. Originally conceived as an elaborate club for the wealthy with plans for a golf course and private airport, it now stands as Belmont Hall. On January 4, 1932, the school’s journey began with eleven students registering for an eight-week winter Bible school at a Brethren in Christ church in Springville, Ontario. The school moved in 1934 to a large house in Gormley, Ontario. In 1938, the Brethren in Christ Ontario Joint Council purchased the Belmont Club along with 122 acres for $13,000, and the school, then called Ontario Bible School, moved to its permanent location along the Niagara Parkway. By 1948, a new dining hall and gymnasium were constructed, and in 1951, the school was renamed Niagara Christian College. By 1952, student athletes had begun competing against other Christian schools and local church teams.

=== Growth and Major Events ===
In 1969, NCC welcomed its first international student from Hong Kong, a foundational moment that would lead to a significant increase in international enrollment. On April 21, 1971, the school faced a setback when its barn and auditorium-gymnasium were destroyed by arson. However, with strong community support, a new gymnasium-auditorium building (now the gymnasium and dining hall) was officially opened that same year in December. The school also began hosting its first Heritage Day on October 22, 1977. This annual fundraising and social event, a highlight for many alumni, featured activities like apple butter making, a car show, and various vendors. Although it finished its long run in the mid-2010s, it left a lasting legacy. In 1982, alumnus E. Morris Sider published Here Faith and Learning Meet: The Story of Niagara Christian College. The school's name was updated to Niagara Christian Collegiate in 1995. The growing student body was accommodated with the construction of a new boys' dormitory in 2000 and a girls' dormitory in 2004.

=== Recent History and Campus Development ===
In 2006, NCC merged with Erie Christian Academy (ECA) to become Niagara Christian Community of Schools, opening an elementary school for grades 6–12. The campus expanded in 2011 with the purchase of an adjacent convent, which became the International Study Centre and library. The elementary school closed in 2012, and the school's name returned to Niagara Christian Collegiate. In 2015, the former elementary school building was renovated into a second boys' dormitory called "the Annex" to accommodate the growing number of international students. A portion of Belmont Hall was also renovated to create a new music space. Like many other schools, NCC was affected by the COVID-19 pandemic, moving to online learning in March 2020. More recently, on October 1, 2022, NCC celebrated its 90th anniversary with a tree-planting ceremony and the launch of the Campus Beautification Campaign. Later that year, from December 23–26, the school and the surrounding region were hit by a major winter storm, but the campus community remained safe and the facilities were able to be maintained.

== Academics ==
Niagara Christian Collegiate (NCC) is a private school that is inspected by the Ministry of Education and is authorized to grant the Ontario Secondary School Diploma (OSSD). The school enrolls students in grades 6 through 12.

NCC offers specialized English as a Second Language (ESL) courses taught by certified instructors. New international students are assessed upon arrival to determine their English proficiency level and are placed into classes to prepare them for secondary school studies and future post-secondary education. The University Preparation Program at NCC is designed to help students prepare for the transition to university.

== School Life ==
NCC offers both day-student and full-time boarding programs. In addition to the academic year, NCC also runs summer programs and camps. Since 1969, the school has hosted international students, with students from 12 countries currently enrolled.

== Notable alumni ==
- Dr. E. Morris Sider, former faculty member, Historian, Author, father of the Brethren in Christ Archives, History professor, Messiah University
- Dr. Wendy Willmore, missionary surgeon, Former Co-director Arusha PAACS General Surgery residency program, Director ICU Arusha Lutheran Medical Centre.
- Dr. Henry Regier, Professor in the Department of Zoology from 1966 to 1995 at the University of Toronto, Member of the Order of Canada, Director of the Institute for Environmental Studies from 1989 to 1994, co-winner of a Nobel Peace Prize for responsible documentation of the risks of climate change.
- Dr. Lucille Marr, Chaplain and Academic Dean, The Presbyterian College, Montreal.
- Simon Tang, Board of Director at NCC, adjunct faculty at The University of Toronto, Certified Public Accountant in the United States, Chartered Accountant in Ontario.
- Viriginia Wong, Landscape Project Designer
