= The Meeting House =

Coordinates: 43.5112°N 79.6851°W

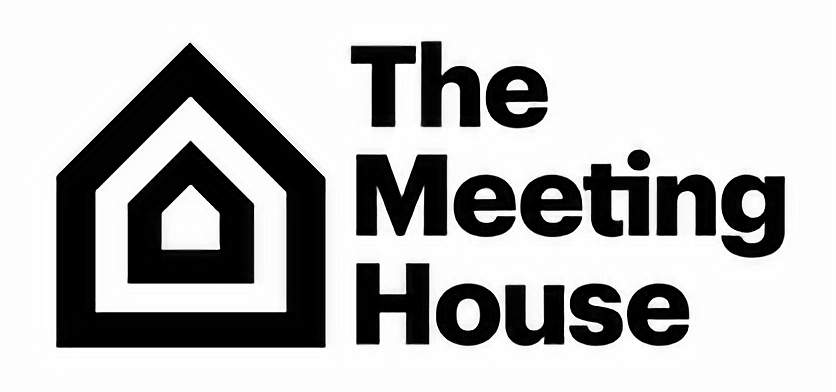
- Location: Oakville, Ontario
- Country: Canada
- Denomination: River Brethren, Anabaptism
- Website: themeetinghouse.com

History
- Founded: 1985
- Founder(s): Craig and Laura Sider

The Meeting House was an Anabaptist church located in the Greater Toronto Area suburb of Oakville, Ontario. A member of the Be in Christ Church of Canada, the Canadian branch of the Brethren in Christ Church, at its height it consisted of nineteen regional sites that met mostly in cinemas, each of which had a lead pastor with a team of elders and part-time staff. It was started in 1985 by Craig and Laura Sider and a board of overseers. From 1997 its senior teaching pastor was Bruxy Cavey during whose tenure the congregation grew to an average weekly attendance of around 5,000—ranked by the Hartford Institute of Religion as the third-largest church in Canada—and expanded to multiple sites in southern Ontario. Cavey stepped down in late 2021 after claims of sexual abuse were substantiated against him. The church paused all public ministry in late June 2024 as it had been denied coverage for abuse liability insurance and employment practices liability. It ceased operations at the end of August, with its remaining sites rebranding as the "BIC Church Collective", a loose association of churches that shared preaching and support functions.

== History ==
In 1985, Craig and Laura Sider moved to Oakville to start Upper Oaks Community Church. They were supported by the Brethren in Christ Canada.

In 1996, Craig and Laura accepted a leadership position with the Brethren in Christ in Pennsylvania. Bruxy Cavey became the teaching pastor, and the church met at Iroquois Ridge High School. Shortly afterward, the church changed its name to "The Meeting House".

In 2018, the attendance was about 5,000 people each Sunday morning. As of 2020, the church reported an average of 9,800 weekly livestream views.

As well as the main location and headquarters in Oakville, Ontario, The Meeting House had about 20 remote locations in Ontario, most around the Greater Toronto Area. Remote locations were referred to as "parishes" and met usually in rented premises, mostly movie theatres. The locations had their own staff including pastors and worship groups. While much of the service at each remote location was specific to that location, the teaching was generally relayed from the Oakville location, either by live link or delayed a week. Regular attendees were encouraged to also join a Home Church. Home churches met in homes every week or every two weeks on weekdays. Each Home Church was attached to a parish.

As well as the official parishes, there was a global community of churches that met and make use of the livestreamed teaching of The Meeting House.

== Leadership ==
The Church was led by a board of overseers, and until 2022, senior pastor Darrell Winger, at which time Karmyn Bokma assumed the role of interim senior pastor.

Bruxy Cavey was the primary teaching pastor from 1996 to 2021, but resigned in March 2022 after an independent investigation determined that he had committed sexual misconduct.

Danielle Strickland was hired in 2019 as an additional teaching pastor. She is the author of eight books including Better Together, The Ultimate Exodus and The Liberating Truth. In March 2022, she announced her resignation "in solidarity with the victim of abuse" by Cavey.

On March 25, 2022, the church announced that Winger would be stepping down. Winger stated that he believed the church needed "new leaders" as it moved into a "season of lament and refinement". On April 14, 2022, the church announced that interim senior leaders would be Karmyn Bokma and Matt Miles, as Senior Pastor and Senior Director respectively.

== Teachings ==
The Meeting House teaching aligned with Anabaptist teachings. They emphasized a lifestyle of compassion, peace, simplicity, and the priority of community. The Meeting House had a particular emphasis on the irreligious nature of the teachings of Jesus. Their core beliefs were outlined in the articles of faith and doctrine of their denomination.

Teaching (sermons) produced on the church's main Oakville campus were either simulcast or sent out on a one-week delay to its remote locations, most of which met in cinemas. These sermons often took the form of series, which focussed on specific books, people, or themes from the Bible.

The Meeting House also produced the "After Party" podcast. This was a live broadcast at 12:00pm EST each Sunday, and featured a changing lineup of pastors, spiritual leaders and scholars who discussed the sermon from earlier in the day. This often involved content which was cut from the sermon, as well as congregation-submitted questions.

== Sexual assault charges, convictions and allegations ==
In 2012, former youth pastor Kieran Naidoo was arrested and charged as part of a large scale child pornography investigation by the Ontario Provincial Police. He was charged with four counts of luring, four counts of sexual exploitation, invitation to sexual touching, and possession of child pornography. Naidoo was later convicted. In January 2021, he was again arrested and charged with sexual exploitation regarding an incident that had occurred between 2002 and 2005. Toronto police stated that they believe there may be additional victims.

In 2014, youth pastor David Churchill was charged with sexual assault and sexual exploitation. The church later stated that Churchill was convicted.

In December 2021, Bruxy Cavey was accused of sexual misconduct and subsequently placed on leave of absence from his role as Teaching Pastor. Cavey was subsequently forced to resign on March 3, 2022, after the conclusion of an independent external investigation into the allegations. A former member, known by the pseudonym "Hagar," came forward to another teaching pastor, Danielle Strickland, with claims that she and Cavey had been in a sexual relationship from 2013 to 2018. Strickland then brought the accusations to the Overseers Board. The independent investigation into Cavey's conduct determined that he had engaged in a sexual relationship with "Hagar" which had begun as a "pastoral counselling relationship" and lasted for "a number of years". The investigation concluded that Cavey's behaviour "amounted to sexual harassment", and that he had "abused his power and authority" in violation of both the church's handbook and Be In Christ's Handbook of Faith and Life. The Overseers Board said that if Cavey had not "accepted responsibility for his actions" and resigned, he would have been fired. Cavey's pastoral credentials were also revoked by the Be In Christ Church of Canada. As scathing as the final report was, Strickland felt it did not go far enough, believing that Cavey had committed clergy sexual abuse. She resigned shortly before the church released its findings "in solidarity with the victim of abuse". In a statement, Maggie John, Chair of the Overseers Board, stated that both Strickland and "Hagar" wanted the church "to use stronger language". As of March 2022, the church had removed all recordings of Cavey's teachings from its website as a result of his misconduct.

On March 12, 2022, the Meeting House announced that it had engaged a victim advocate to receive concerns of sexual misconduct by a staff member of the church.

In a town hall on March 31, 2022, the church announced that it had received additional allegations against Cavey, and historical concerns related to Naidoo. These allegations had not yet been investigated. At the Town Hall, Overseer Carol Ann Stephen acknowledged "the harm and hurt that has happened" in the church and Ottawa Lead Pastor Eric Versluis spoke about the challenge of the church trying to discern who they are without Cavey.

On May 21, 2022, the church announced that it had received allegations against Tim Day, who had served as Senior Pastor of the church for 14 years. Day was accused of sexual misconduct and abuse.

On June 6, 2022, the Hamilton Police Service announced that they had arrested Cavey and charged him with sexual assault. In their announcement, the police stated that they "believe there may be more victims", encouraging them to come forward. Cavey was released with conditions pending a court appearance. Two additional charges were brought against Cavey, but the initial charges were stayed due to delays in bringing the case to trial, and the other charges were withdrawn on September 5, 2024.

On June 7, 2022, at a Town Hall event, the church disclosed that they had received 38 reports about clergy sexual misconduct and abuse by former pastors Naidoo, Churchill, Cavey, and Day, along with other leaders and staff. At the event, Jennifer Hryniw, Co-Chair of the Overseers Board, acknowledged that there had been a pattern of "prioritizing the care and well-being of offenders over victims," describing multiple stories where victims "felt shamed and rejected by the church, while the offender was supported through so-called restoration."

In March 2024, The Walrus reported that the church was facing lawsuits from three former members alleging that they had been sexually abused by Churchill and Naidoo a decade earlier. The plaintiffs alleged that The Meeting House "created the risk of sexual assault that allowed" the abuse to occur, and failed to "properly supervise" and "instruct" ministers about the risks of such behaviour.

In late June 2024 The Meeting House suspended all public ministry until July 31 at the earliest after being informed that it would lose its "Abuse Liability (AL) and Employment Practices Liability (EPL) coverage" at the end of the month. After a month of relying on pre-recorded teachings, The Meeting House resumed live ministry by way of a livestreamed teaching on YouTube on August 4, 2024. The church suspended operations on August 29, 2024. Its nine remaining sites reorganized as the "BIC Church Collective", sharing preaching and back-office functions.
