= Old Order River Brethren =

Denomination of Anabaptist Christianity

- Type: Protestant
- Classification: Anabaptist
- Orientation: River Brethren
- Origin: c. 1778; Pennsylvania, U.S.
- Congregations: 5 (2014)
- Members: ~550 (2014)

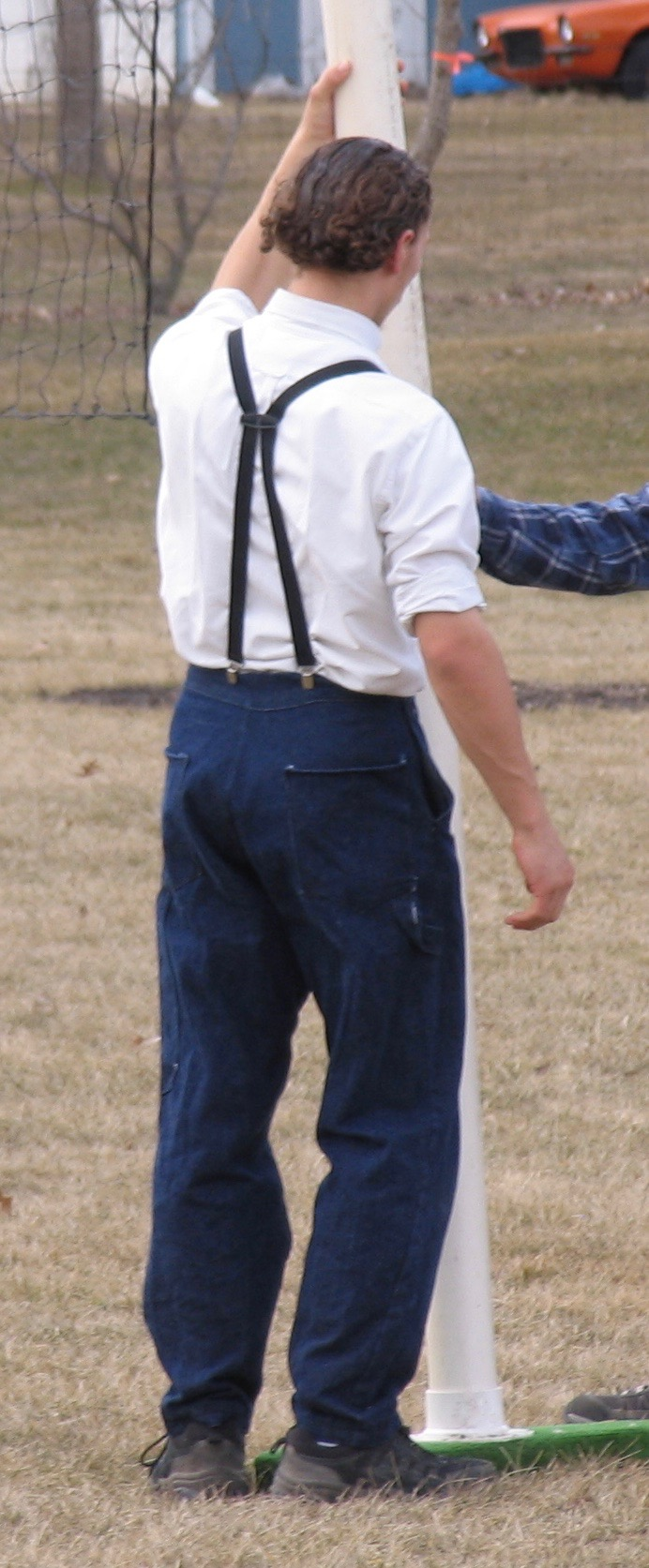
Old Order River Brethren young man

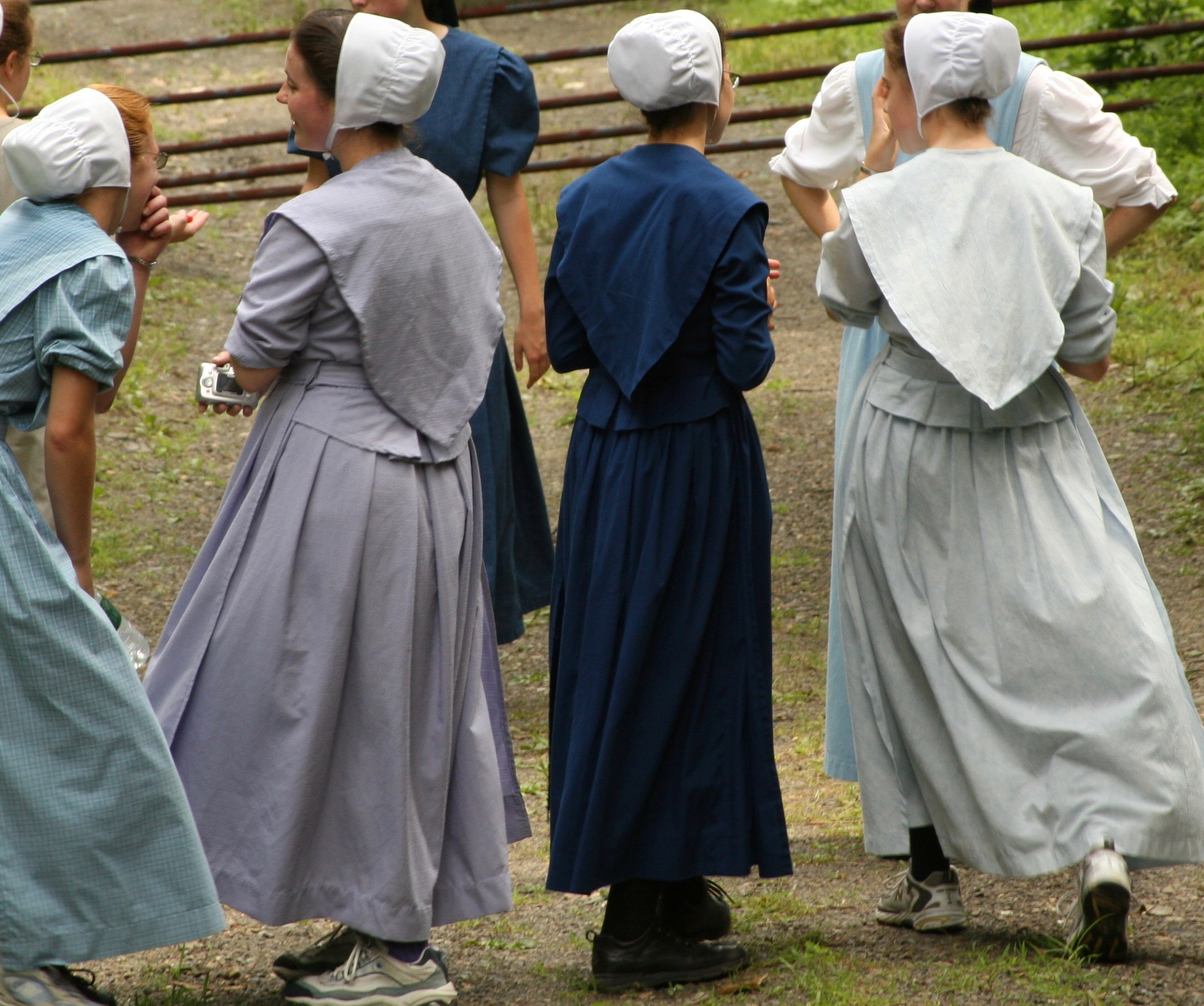
Old Order River Brethren young women

The Old Order River Brethren, formerly sometimes known as York Brethren or Yorkers, are a River Brethren denomination of Anabaptist Christianity with roots in the Radical Pietist movement. As their name indicates, they are Old Order Anabaptists.

== History ==
The denomination began about 1778 in Pennsylvania. They share their early history with the Brethren in Christ Church. A group of brethren living near the Susquehanna River, who had previously separated from the Mennonites fellowshiped with German Baptist Brethren but eventually became known as the River Brethren. In 1856, there was a three-way split among the River Brethren, with the Yorkers (because most of the members in 1843 were located in York County, Pennsylvania) establishing a separate, more conservative group.

The York Brethren believed that the majority of the River Brethren churches were becoming too lax in their standard of Biblical non-conformity and non-resistance, and desired to return to older Scriptural doctrines and traditions. With the increase of more progressive and modernizing groups in Christendom following the industrial revolution, and the emergence of clarifying naming of other traditional Old Order groups among the plain people such as Amish (Old Order Amish forming 1862–1878), the Mennonites (Old Order Mennonites, 1872–1901) and the German Baptist Brethren (Old German Baptist Brethren 1882) in the late 1800s they defined themselves also as "Old Order".

Between 1921 and 1961 four splits occurred in the group, mostly regarding the use of cars, leaving the Old Order River Brethren divided into five subgroups. Three of the five groups reunited between 1969 and 1977 so that there are three subgroups currently.

== Religious practice ==
Traditionally meetings for worship are held in the homes and barns of the members. In recent times, meetinghouses and public buildings are sometimes used for church services. Ministers are un-salaried, with no formal training for preachers. Ministers are chosen from among the godly men of the congregation who fulfil the Scriptural description of church leaders in 1 Timothy 3.1–13, and Titus 1.5 – 3.11. A congregation traditionally has a bishop, two ministers, and one or two deacons.

Testimonies are an integral part of every worship service, which opens by allowing all members, male and female to share personal testimonies, answers to prayer, or songs. There is no separate Sunday School, but all members learn, worship and study the Bible together.

The weekend long Lovefeast observance of Communion is practiced which includes preaching, singing, self examination, communal meals, and foot washing.

Believer's baptism is practiced after conversion, most often during the teen years. Baptism is by trine immersion in the name of the Father, the name of the Son, and the name of the Holy Spirit, in natural, outdoor water (often a pond, a river or a stream), as with other plain Brethren. Outdoor baptism is practiced regardless of weather.

Old Order River Brethren wear a conservative form of plain dress. Male members wear beards (usually with moustaches), long pants usually of dark colors and often with suspenders, and wear button-up shirts with sleeves. Female members wear opaque white cotton head coverings, along with long cape dresses in solid-color cloth or very small print. The women's dress has a Mennonite type or attached cape on front, and a Brethren style, or loose cape back. As among many other plain groups, they do not require their children to dress according to the church member dress pattern until conversion, baptism and church membership; which is usually in their teens or 20s. Prior to this, children and youth wear modest, gender-conforming clothing.

In 1919 the Old Order River Brethren forbade the use of automobiles and thus the use of horse-drawn vehicles was generally maintained until the Musser group allowed cars in 1951 and the Strickler group in 1954. A third smaller and shrinking subgroup, called the "Old Church", still uses horse and buggy transportation.

Television is not allowed, but electricity, telephones and limited internet are accepted. Members who feel called to a certain occupation which requires college education are not uncommon, but most of these are in service-oriented occupations, such as medical and dental training. This is seen as continuing the ministry that Jesus had among the sick and needy, when He walked on earth.

During the 20th century the Pennsylvania German was replaced by English, which has been used exclusively in services since about the 1940s. Only a few members still spoke the Pennsylvania German of their ancestors by the 1990s.

== Members and congregations ==
Year	Membership
1935	472
1960	~340
1986	327
2000	388
2019	~500

During the 20th century several settlements of the Old Order River Brethren in Pennsylvania, Ohio, Indiana, and Ontario dwindled and finally became extinct. For 1935 and 1937 the Association of Religion Data Archives lists 472 members for the Old Order Yorker River Brethren, that is the Old Order River Brethren. In 1960 there were 340 members.

In 1986 there were 327 members in three subgroups, the Strickler group with 172 members, located in Lancaster and Franklin counties, Pennsylvania, and Dallas County, Iowa, the Horst group with 121 members in Lancaster and Franklin counties and the "Old Church" with 34 members in Franklin County.

In the year 2000 all groups of the Old Order River Brethren had together 328 members, organized in three subgroups and five congregations. The Strickler group had three districts, Franklin with 86 members, Lancaster with 83 and Dallas Center in Iowa with 33, all together 202 members. The Horst group had one district in Franklin County with 109 members, and the Old Church also one in Franklin County with 17 members. The horse and buggy people have relocated to Clay County, Kansas, between 2000 and 2010. In the 2010s a new congregation was planted near Berkeley Springs, West Virginia.

The total population of all Old Order River Brethren groups including children and young not yet baptized members was between 530 and 535 around the year 2000. In 2014 all Old Order River Brethren groups together had about 550 members in five congregations, of which the "Old Church" had only about half a dozen members.

Poet and historian G. C. Waldrep (born 1968) is a member of the Old Order River Brethren, as well as author Stephen Scott (1948 – 2011) until his death.

== Publishing ==
The Old Order River Brethren publish a newsletter called The Golden Chain. In 1984 Sonlight River Brethren School was started in Lancaster County.

== Literature ==
- Margaret C. Reynolds: Plain Women: Gender and Ritual in the Old Order River Brethren, University Park, PA, 2001.
- Laban T. Brechbill: History of the Old Order River Brethren, Wrightsville, PA, 1972.
- Laban T. Brechbill: Doctrine of the Old Order River Brethren, 1967.
- Myron Dietz: The Old Order River Brethren, in "Brethren in Christ History and Life 6", June 1983, pages 4–35.
- Stephen E. Scott: The Old Order River Brethren Church, in "Pennsylvania Mennonite Heritage I", July 1978, pages 13–22.
- Donald B. Kraybill: Concise Encyclopedia of Amish, Brethren, Hutterites and Mennonites, Baltimore, 2010.
- Donald B. Kraybill and Nelson Hostetter: Anabaptist World USA, Scottdale, PA, and Waterloo, ON, 2001.

== Links ==
- Beulah S. Hostetler: An Old Order River Brethren Love Feast in Pennsylvania Folklife, Winter 1974·1975 Vol. XXIV, No. 2, pages 8–20.
