= Skevikarna =

Swedish Radical Pietist Christian community

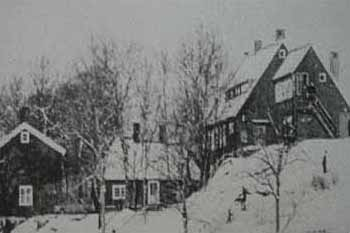
Skevik's farm on the island Värmdön in the Stockholm archipelago outside Stockholm

Skevikare, or Skevikarna, was a Swedish Radical Pietist Christian community. It was founded in c. 1722 in Finland when it was under Swedish rule by the "Eriksson brothers", two Swedish-speaking Finnish Swedish Army officers.

After initial prosecution by the Lutheran Orthodox authorities, they went on exile in Denmark, Germany, and the Netherlands during 11 years. In 1745 they were allowed to return to Sweden, where they established the community on the island Värmdön in the Stockholm archipelago outside of Stockholm.

After having been accepted by the authorities, they received many visitors, including two of Sweden's kings, showing them the respect they were denied for so many years. After Pietism was accepted as a legitimate expression of Lutheranism by the state church authorities, the Skevikare community eventually disestablished around 1830.

The literature produced by the community remains preserved by the Royal Library in Stockholm.

== History ==
Their history is one of the most intriguing of the Radical Pietistic movement in Scandinavia. It started about 1720 with the "Eriksson brothers" among the Swedish-speaking population of west Finland. These two former officers in the Swedish Army preached the Pietist spirituality, why they were soon brought before court, having denied some of the doctrines of the Lutheran Church of Sweden.

After a seven-year-long trial they arrived in Stockholm in 1733 to be officially exiled. But instead of awaiting the final decision, they asked for permission to leave the country immediately together with their 60 followers, which was accepted.

=== Exile ===
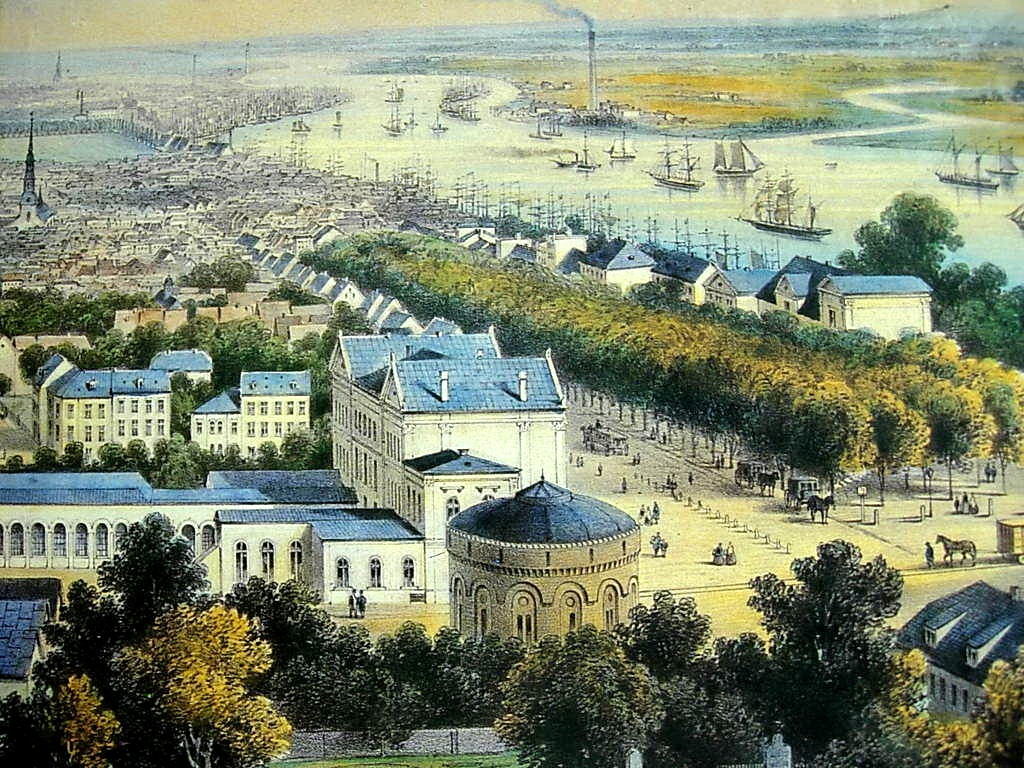
View over Altona (1850)

They first left for Copenhagen, Denmark, but were not welcomed. So, a sailing ship was bought, and the whole community went aboard. At that time their movement had grown to about 90 persons, some coming over from Sweden and Finland, others joining in Denmark. Then for several years, they had to stay on the ship, sailing up and down the coasts of Denmark and Norway, very seldom allowed to anchor at any harbour. At one time they were being shot at from a town. Another time a woman needed to go ashore to get help to give birth to her child, which she was denied. At winter, they had to anchor outside a desolate coast and dig caves on the shore for the elderly to live in, because of the coldness aboard the ship. Finally, they came to Altona (then belonging to Denmark), a town where many Pietists and Mennonites were living, and could settle there. But not for long. They were too radical even for Altona, and had to leave, not finding a resting place anywhere. So they went to the Netherlands, and had about the same story there.

=== The Skevik period ===
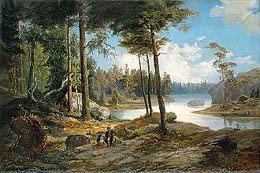
View from Värmdö (1865), oil painting by King Karl XV (1826–1872)

After 11 years of exile hardships living as strangers and pilgrims, they were allowed to return to Sweden in 1745. A wealthy salesman who admired them bought them a farm on the Värmdö island outside of Stockholm. At this farm, called Skevik, from which they got their name, they finally settled, and stayed there for the rest of their lives. From there they secretly distributed a lot of Pietistic and mystic literature, keeping in contact with other like-minded Christians all over Northern Europe.

During this time they had many visitors, among them even two of Sweden's kings, showing them the respect they were denied for so many years.

With the end of the Skevikare community around 1830, the Radical Pietistic movement in Sweden ceased.

== Practices ==
By the locals they were known also as the Främlingarna ('Strangers'), which they also called themselves, and were described as "hermits" wearing hooded coats and having long, loose hanging hair spread over their shoulders. When members of their community had died, they usually came to one of Stockholm's graveyards at night, leaving the body on the ground inside the church area's outer wall. Then the priest would bury the corpse the next day. This practice lead to the people of Stockholm beginning to tell ghost stories about that place at nights.

== Legacy ==
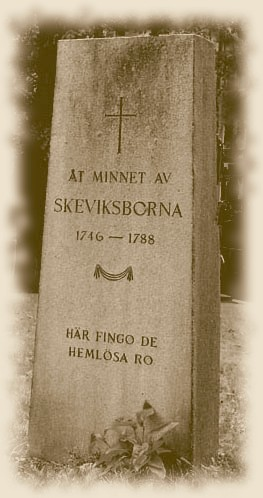
Memorial stone for the Skevikarna outside of Church of Saint John in Stockholm

There is also a large cave-like formation on Värmdö island, where the Skevikarna used to gather for prayer and meditation. This cave was used in a scene in Ingmar Bergman's movie The Seventh Seal (1957).

After the movement's demise, the farm was handed over to the local authorities, and the memory of the Skevikarna faded away. However, about half a century later, a newly arrived priest to the island was handed an old handwritten journal by a parishioner. When the priest sat down at home later in the evening, to read the book, he found that the Skevikarna had recorded their exile story, and he later made it into a small booklet.

Much of their handwritten literature is preserved at the Royal Library in Stockholm and in Uppsala.

== See also ==
- Radical Pietism
- Ephrata Community
