= Hindustani Covenant Church =

- Classification: Protestant
- Orientation: Evangelical, Congregationalist
- Polity: Congregationalist
- Moderator: Rev Dr Steven David
- Associations: IFFEC, National Council of Churches in India
- Region: Present in 12 states: Andaman and Nicobar Islands, Andhra Pradesh, Bihar, Goa, Gujarat, Haryana, Jammu and Kashmir, Karnataka, Maharashtra, Odisha, Uttar Pradesh and Uttarakhand
- Founder: Mission Covenant Church of Sweden
- Origin: 17 October 1963 in Pune
- Congregations: 111 (2012)
- Members: 22976 (2012)
- Ministers: 119 (2012)
- Aid organization: Social projects in many places through Covenant Social Service
- Hospitals: 2
- Secondary schools: 3

Hindustani Covenant Church (HCC) is an evangelical, congregationalist denomination in India. It has 111 local congregations and is represented in twelve states. The highest authority is the Church Council, which meets once a year and consists of representatives from all congregations. The Church Council elects the Executive Committee. The Church Headquarters is in Pune. Ministers are educated at Union Biblical Seminary (UBS) in Pune, which educates ministers to a number of denominations.

== History ==
At the World Mission Conference in Tambaram, India, in December 1938, the Mission Covenant Church of Sweden President Axel Andersson and the missionary Gustaf Ahlbert examined the possibilities to start mission work in India. Already in 1939 the MCCS decided to start mission work among Turkish peoples and Muslims in India and the following year the first missionaries arrived in Mumbai. The mission work was registered under the name of the Swedish Hindustani Mission. Later on work was also taken up in Pune and Sholapur. The first person baptised was a refugee from Xinjiang, Noor Muhammed, a physician who was given the name Luke. He helped with the translation of the Old Testament into Uighur. On October 19, 1963, 22 delegates from the three congregations in Pune, Mumbai and Sholapur, among them 6 missionaries, assembled and founded the Hindustani Covenant Church (HCC). Rev. B. Thoma became its first moderator and remained at this post up to his retirement in 1986 when he was succeeded by the present moderator, Rev Steven David.

== Social work ==
HCC has a quite large social work. This is coordinated by a body called Covenant Social Service (CSS). Social work has comprised humanitarian aid in case of catastrophic events like floodings and earth quakes, community development, health care and education. In 1981, HCC founded St. Luke's Medical Society (SLMS), in order to provide health care. SLMS has two hospitals, a smaller one in Nannaj near Sholapur and another one in Aurad, near Gulbarga in Karnataka. HCC also works with education. The Church runs three High schools, in Gulbarga, Nannaj and Sholapur and one Junior College of Science in Solapur. There are also a number of informal education projects for the poorest children. Besides, CSS offers courses leading to certain professions in order to help people to find a sustainable livelihood.

== See also ==
Christianity in India
