= Brethren in Christ Church Society =

Church in India

Brethren in Christ Church Society is a Protestant denomination of India, founded by James Ard. It is focused on Bihar. It is limited to states in the east of India. The church has thousands of members. Several dozens of parishes are within the church. They are part of the Brethren in Christ Church, a Mennonite group.

== Sources ==
- "Brethren in Christ". Adherents.com. Archived from the original on 11 December 2003.
