= United Zion Church =

- Type: Protestant
- Classification: Anabaptist
- Orientation: River Brethren
- Origin: 1855
- Congregations: 12 in US (2010)
- Members: 721 in US (2010)

The United Zion Church is a River Brethren Christian denomination with roots in the Mennonite Church and the Radical Pietistic movement.

A body that became known as River Brethren began about 1778 in Pennsylvania. They were a group of brethren near the Susquehanna River that had separated from the Mennonites. As such groups of brethren were often named by their location, they were called River Brethren. The majority of churches descending from the River Brethren are known as the Brethren in Christ Church.

Bishop Matthias Brinser was excluded from the River Brethren in 1855, and he organized his followers into a separate group, originally known as United Zion's Children. The reason for the exclusion of Brinser and his followers was that he had led them in building a meeting house for worship. The church incorporated as United Zion Church in 1954. They are similar in doctrine and practice to the Brethren in Christ Church. Church organization allows for settling basic matters at the district conference, with a general conference being the highest level of church authority.

As of 2010, the church consisted of 721 members in 12 congregations in three Pennsylvania counties. There are two overseas churches located in Santiago, Chile. These churches began as a single church plant in 1988 in the Maipú suburb of Santiago. This church was locally given the name Fuente de Vida.
