= Brethren in Christ Church =

River Brethren Christian denomination

- Classification: Protestant
- Orientation: Anabaptist
- Theology: River Brethren
- Associations: National Association of Evangelicals Mennonite World Conference
- Origin: c. 1778; Marietta, Pennsylvania
- Separations: Calvary Holiness Church (1964)

Brethren in Christ U.S. logo

The Brethren in Christ Church (BIC) is a River Brethren Christian denomination. Falling within the Anabaptist tradition of Christianity, the Brethren in Christ Church has roots in the Mennonite church, with influences from the revivals of Radical Pietism and the holiness movement. They have also been known as River Brethren and River Mennonites. The Canadian denomination, which formerly shared a name with its American counterpart, is now called Be In Christ.

== History ==
The Brethren in Christ have their headquarters in Pennsylvania. It loosely shares an early connection with the United Brethren back to 1767. The Brethren in Christ trace their denomination back to a group of Mennonites who lived just north of Marietta, Pennsylvania, on the east side of the Susquehanna River. As they met to study the Bible and to worship God in the 1770s, the people of this group who became known as the River Brethren searched early church history and developed a conviction that believer's baptism by triune immersion was the scriptural form of baptism. The River Brethren of the 18th century also held to a firm reliance on the centrality of Jesus in Scripture, especially the literal application of the Sermon on the Mount, in Matthew 5–7.

Being Anabaptists, the River Brethren emphasized the beliefs of nonresistance and nonconformity to the world. Their origin in the Radical Pietistic revivals led the River Brethren to emphasize "the conversion experience, a strong devotional life, and testimony." Jacob Engle is noted as one of the early leaders (sometimes considered the "founder" of the BIC Church). The first confessional statement of this group was formulated around 1780, after the stressful time of the American Revolution.

During the American Civil War, when required by the Union government of the United States to register as a body that held peaceful, non-combatant non-resistance values, the name "Brethren in Christ'" was adopted. "River Brethren" remained the term of popular usage into the 20th century for the American members of the denomination while "Dunkers" was the popular moniker given to the Canadian denomination members until the 1930s.

The denomination still holds strongly to its pursuit of peace, but within the denomination there are many different interpretations of how this peaceful lifestyle should be lived out. Many live out social pacifism, while others do not view Christ's call to peace as an antiwar statement, but as a call to live peacefully on an interpersonal level. The history of the denomination is replete with stories of conscientious objection.

Other branches of the River Brethren include the Old Order River Brethren (org. 1843), the United Zion Church (org. 1855), and the Calvary Holiness Church.

About the turn of the 20th century, the Brethren in Christ was influenced by the holiness movement.

Members of the Brethren in Christ Church founded Messiah College in 1909 (Grantham, Pennsylvania), and the Niagara Christian College (later Niagara Christian Community of Schools) in 1932 as a Christian preparatory school in Ontario, Canada.

== Beliefs ==
The church's current Articles of Faith and Doctrine were adopted in 1986 and emphasize the understanding of the inspired scriptures by the church in community with the illumination of the Holy Spirit, the "centrality of Christ" in the divine revelation, the necessity of holiness, nonviolence and the importance of community. The church believes that God the Father, God the Son, and God the Holy Spirit reveals Himself through the divine record of scripture and that salvation through the death and resurrection of Jesus Christ is received through the response of personal faith and repentance. Baptism by triune immersion and the Lord's supper are considered ordinances of the church. Foot washing, the dedication of children, prayer for the sick, laying on of hands, and anointing with oil are important accepted practices but are not called ordinances.

A distinctive of the Brethren in Christ, together with other Anabaptist denominations, is the practice of "Community Hermeneutics" in which the interpretation of the scriptures is to be done by the church in community, rather than being the responsibility of the church hierarchy or that of the individual Christian.

== Status ==
At the denomination's 2006 General Conference, the Brethren in Christ Church in North America had about 295 churches in the United States and Canada. As of 2001, in the United States there were 20,739 members in 232 churches. Pennsylvania remains the hub of the denomination, with nearly half its congregations and a majority of its members. However, there are numerous congregations in other states, particularly Florida, Ohio, and California. Denominational headquarters is in Grantham, Pennsylvania, next to the Grantham BIC Church and Messiah University.

There are 1,100 churches in 23 countries with a worldwide membership of around 80,000. The BIC church maintains some connection to its Mennonite-influenced heritage by partnering in ministry with the Mennonite Central Committee.

The church organization is divided into seven regional conferences (each represented by a bishop who sits on the Leadership Council) and one subconference. The conferences are as follows: Allegheny, Atlantic, Great Lakes, Midwest, Pacific, Southeast, and Susquehanna; the subconference is centered around Miami, Florida, and focuses on Hispanic ministries. Messiah University in Grantham, and Niagara Christian Collegiate in Fort Erie, Ontario, Canada, are affiliated with the BIC.

The church is also has affiliations with a number of camps, conference centers, and ministries, as well as Evangel Publishing House in Nappanee, Indiana, and Christian Light Bookstores in Indiana, Maryland, Pennsylvania, and Ohio.

=== BIC Canada ===
In 2012, the Canadian Conference of the Brethren in Christ and the General Conference of the Brethren in Christ recognized the advantage for both of being independent Churches. Both approved a separation affirmation. The result was the development of BIC Canada and the BIC in the US. They continue to work collaboratively with each other and yet recognize their distinctive national identities and structures. In 2017, BIC Canada changed its name to "Be in Christ Church of Canada."

Be In Christ Canada has three different expressions of churches: Community Churches, The Meeting House, and Reunion.

== Noted Brethren in Christ people ==
- Jay Smith, Christian apologist
- Bruxy Cavey, author and former pastor
- Harold Albrecht, Canadian former Member of Parliament for the riding of Kitchener—Conestoga in Ontario, founder of Pathway Community Church in Kitchener, Ontario.

== See also ==
- Brethren in Christ Church Society
