= International Federation of Free Evangelical Churches =

Federation of minor Protestant denominations

- Abbreviation: IFFEC
- Classification: Evangelical Christianity (Pietistic and Radical Pietistic)
- Region: 33 countries
- Headquarters: Witten, Germany
- Origin: 1948
- Members: 700,000
- Official website: iffec.org

International Federation of Free Evangelical Churches (IFFEC) is an international federation of evangelical free churches that trace their roots to the Radical Pietist movement (which split off/diverged from Pietistic Lutheranism). The member federations predominantly originate from Europe and the Americas.

== History ==
The history of the Federation has roots in a 19th century European pietist movement. IFFEC was founded in Bern, Switzerland, in 1948 by unions of free evangelical churches from various countries.

== Statistics ==
According to a census published by the association in 2023, it had 31 national member associations, with 700,000 members in 33 countries.

The two largest member federations are the Evangelical Covenant Church and the Evangelical Free Church of America in the United States. The two largest European federations are Uniting Church in Sweden and Bund Freier Evangelischer Gemeinden, Germany. The two largest federations in Asia are both in India, Evangelical Free Church of India, and Hindustani Covenant Church.

== Beliefs ==
The Federation has a confession of faith based on the beliefs of the Believers' Church.
