= River Brethren =

Certain Anabaptist Christian groups

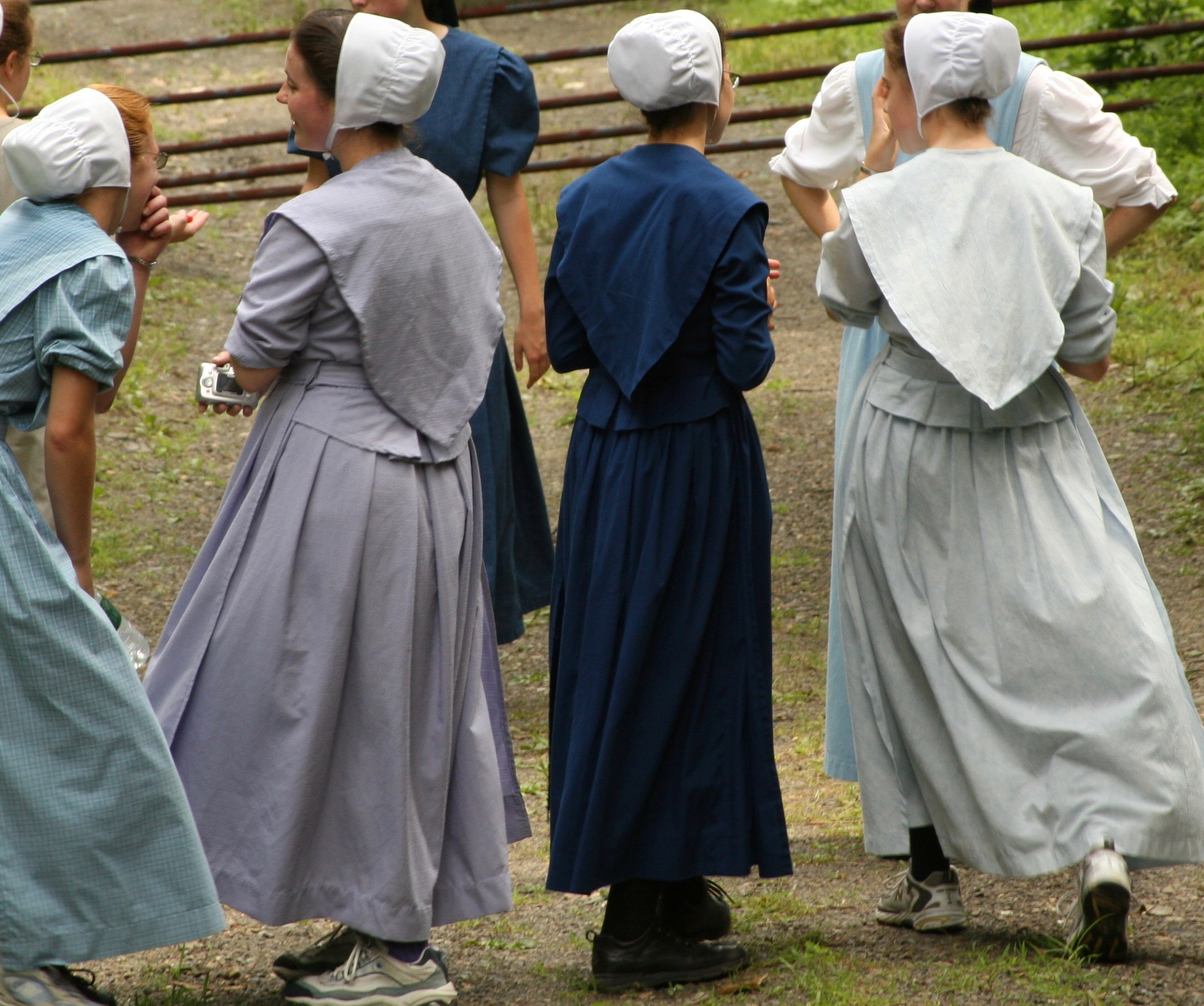
Old Order River Brethren women

The River Brethren are a group of historically related Anabaptist Christian denominations originating in 1770, during the Radical Pietist movement among German colonists in Pennsylvania. In the 17th century, Mennonite refugees from Switzerland had settled their homes near the Susquehanna River in the northeastern United States.

Their religious guides, Jacob and John Engle, joined with the revival, and their followers were often known by their locality: a group of brethren from north of Marietta, Pennsylvania, on the east side of the Susquehanna River came to be known as the River Brethren.

The initial spiritual leader of the brethren was Martin Boehm, evangelical preacher, who was excluded from the Mennonite Church. He later became bishop of the Church of the United Brethren in Christ. The River Brethren distanced themselves from Boehm and the United Brethren movement.

Influenced by the Schwarzenau Brethren (named Dunkers), the River Brethren developed a conviction that trine (triple, in allusion to the Trinity) immersion, foot washing, adherence to plain dress, the wearing of a headcovering by women and teetotalism was the scriptural form of religion. They oppose war, alcohol, tobacco, and worldly pleasures.

Nevertheless, they maintained their identity and did not join the Dunker movement. Jacob Engle is one of the early leaders who promoted trine immersion. The first confessional statement of this group was formulated around 1780.

As of 2010, there were four bodies of River Brethren in about 300 congregations:

- Brethren in Christ Church
- Calvary Holiness Church
- Old Order River Brethren (also called Yorker Brethren)
- United Zion Church

Common to the Radical Piestic tradition, the River Brethren hold experience meetings, in which "members [are seen] testifying of God's work in their lives in bringing them to salvation and daily living." When a member has a conversion experience, he or she begins taking part in the experience meeting and then requests baptism. The Old Order River Brethren continue the practice of plain dress.

Several factions of the River Brethren withdrew in the middle of the 19th century, including the Yorker Brethren and the United Zion Church, while the main body took the name Brethren in Christ, by which a group of Mennonites is also known.

There were about 11,000 members in the United States and Canada in 1992. They carry out missionary work in Asia and Africa.
