= Radical Pietism =

Pietists who broke with Lutheranism

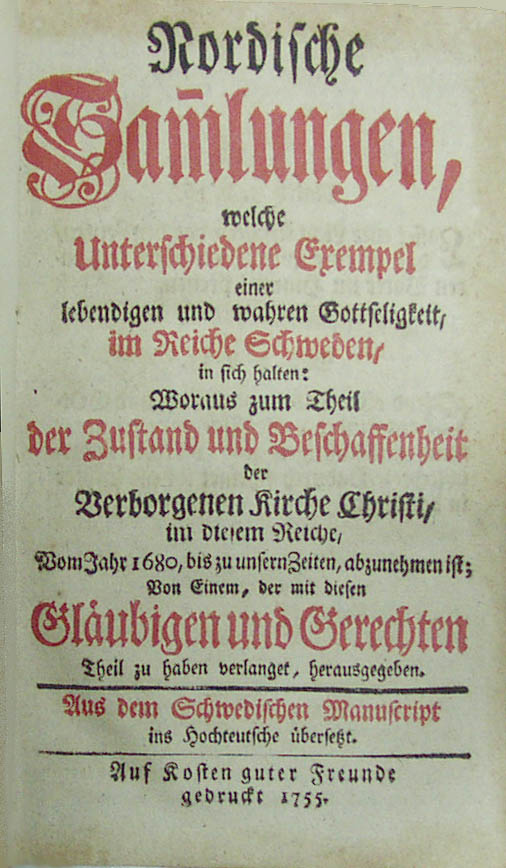
Title page from "Nordische Sammlungen", a work in German, covering the martyrdom of several Radical Pietists in Sweden

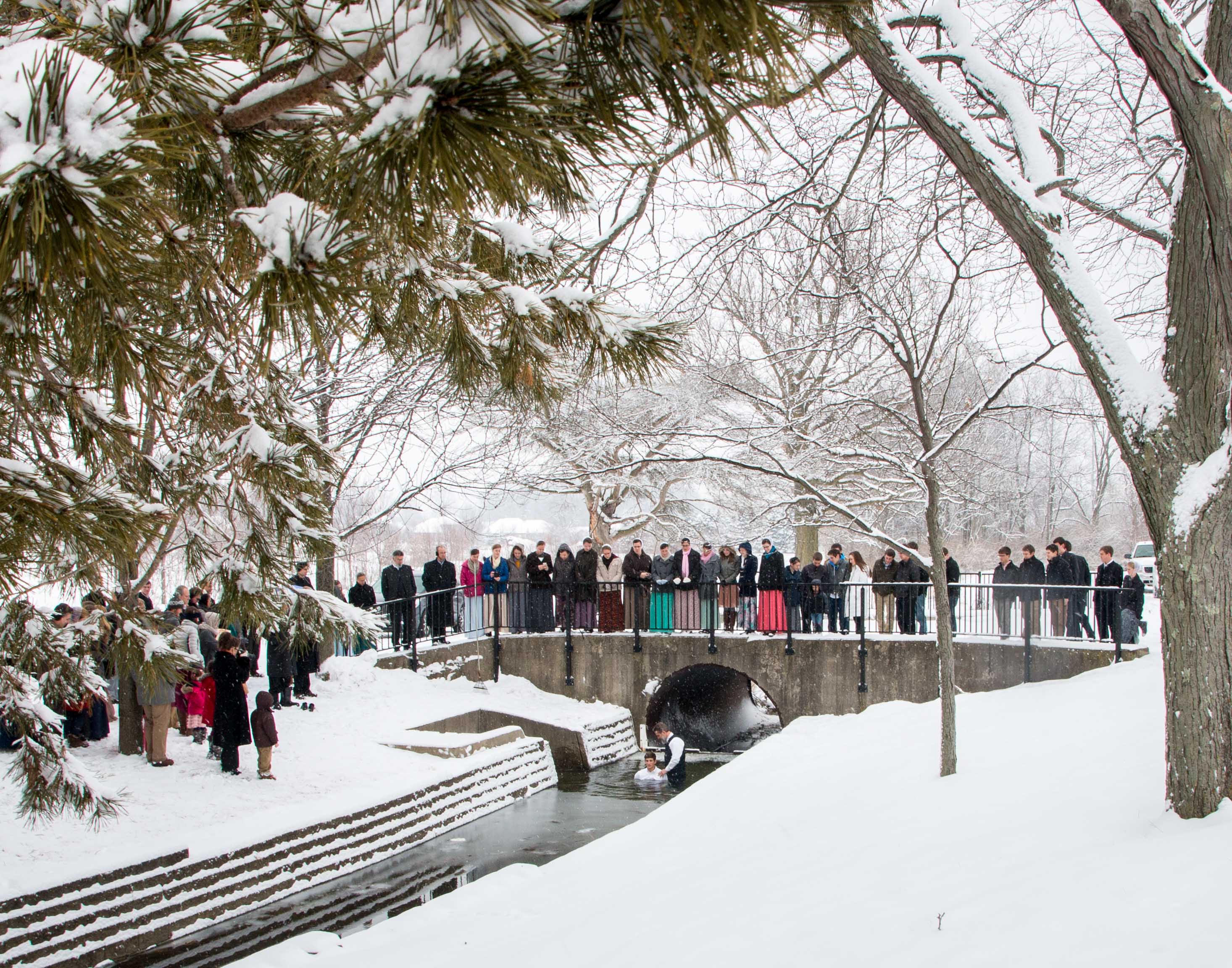
The Schwarzenau Brethren ordinance of baptism by trine immersion is celebrated by the Salem Congregation of the Old German Baptist Brethren Church, New Conference

Radical Pietism are those Christian churches that have decided to break with denominational Lutheranism to emphasize certain teachings regarding holy living. Radical Pietists contrast with Church Pietists, who chose to remain within their Lutheran denominational settings. Radical Pietists distinguish between true and false Christianity and hold that the latter is represented by established churches. They separated from established churches to form their own Christian denominations.

Radical Pietism emphasizes the need for a "religion of the heart," instead of the head, and is characterized by ethical purity, inward devotion, charity, and asceticism. Leadership emphasized the sanctification of adherents instead of sacramentalism. The Pietistic movement developed in Germany and was led by those who believed a deeper emotional experience was incompatible with what they saw as a preset adherence to form, no matter how genuine. It stressed a personal experience of salvation and a continuous openness to new spiritual illumination.

Many of the Radical Pietists are influenced by the writings of Jakob Böhme, Gottfried Arnold, and Philipp Jakob Spener, among others. They teach that personal holiness (piety), spiritual maturity, Bible study, prayer, and fasting are essential toward "feeling the effects" of grace.

Churches in the Radical Pietist movement include the Mennonite Brethren Church, Community of True Inspiration (Inspirationalists), the Baptist General Conference, members of the International Federation of Free Evangelical Churches (such as the Evangelical Covenant Church and the Evangelical Free Church), the Templers, the River Brethren (inclusive of the Brethren in Christ Church, the Calvary Holiness Church, the Old Order River Brethren and the United Zion Church), as well as the Schwarzenau Brethren.

== Beliefs ==
Unlike Pietistic Lutherans, Radical Pietists believe in separation from the established Lutheran Churches. They believe that Christians can live through direct empowerment of the Holy Ghost rather than relying on a complex hierarchy. Churches in the tradition of Radical Pietism teach the necessity of the New Birth in which one has a personal conversion experience to Christ. Radical Pietists emphasize the importance of holy living and thus frequently practice fasting and prayer. They also believe in non-resistance and thus "forbid Christians to shed blood."

With regard to baptism, many Radical Pietists, such as the Schwarzenau Brethren, hold to the teaching of trine (triple) baptism: "that the original and apostolic form of baptism was to immerse the candidate forward into the water three times (once in the name of the Father, once in the name of the Son, and once in the name of the Spirit)." Radical Pietists, such as the Schwarzenau Brethren and the River Brethren, also practice the lovefeast, which includes footwashing and the holy kiss, as well as closed communion. The Radical Pietistic communities do not believe in the swearing of oaths. They resolve problems in the community at the congregational level under church councils presided by elders, rather than in civil courts. Members who sin openly are visited by the elders and encouraged to repent of their transgressions.

== Active communities ==
Churches in the Radical Pietist movement include the Baptist General Conference, the Community of True Inspiration (Inspirationalists), members of the International Federation of Free Evangelical Churches (such as the Evangelical Covenant Church and the Evangelical Free Church), the Mennonite Brethren Church, the Templers, the River Brethren, and the Schwarzenau Brethren.

=== Baptist General Conference/Converge ===
Converge, formerly known as the Baptist General Conference, emerged as a result of Radical Pietism spreading in Sweden. The denomination emerged among Radical Pietists who separated from state churches and emphasizes the doctrines of "believer's baptism, a believer's church, free access to read and study Scripture, the importance of prayer and other spiritual disciplines, and a lifestyle that exhibited separation from sin."

=== North American Baptist Conference ===
The North American Baptist Conference emerged in a similar way to the Baptist General Conference but in the United States and Canada for German-speaking immigrants.

=== Community of True Inspiration ===
The Community of True Inspiration, today based in the Amana Colonies, are known for their reliance upon Werkzeuge who are men and women inspired by the Holy Spirit. The Inspirationists' temporal affairs continue to prosper because of their "balanced combination of agriculture, tourism, and the manufacture of Amana refrigerators." Adherents belonging to the Community of True Inspiration practice their Radical Pietistic faith relatively unchanged for hundreds of years.

=== International Federation of Free Evangelical Churches ===
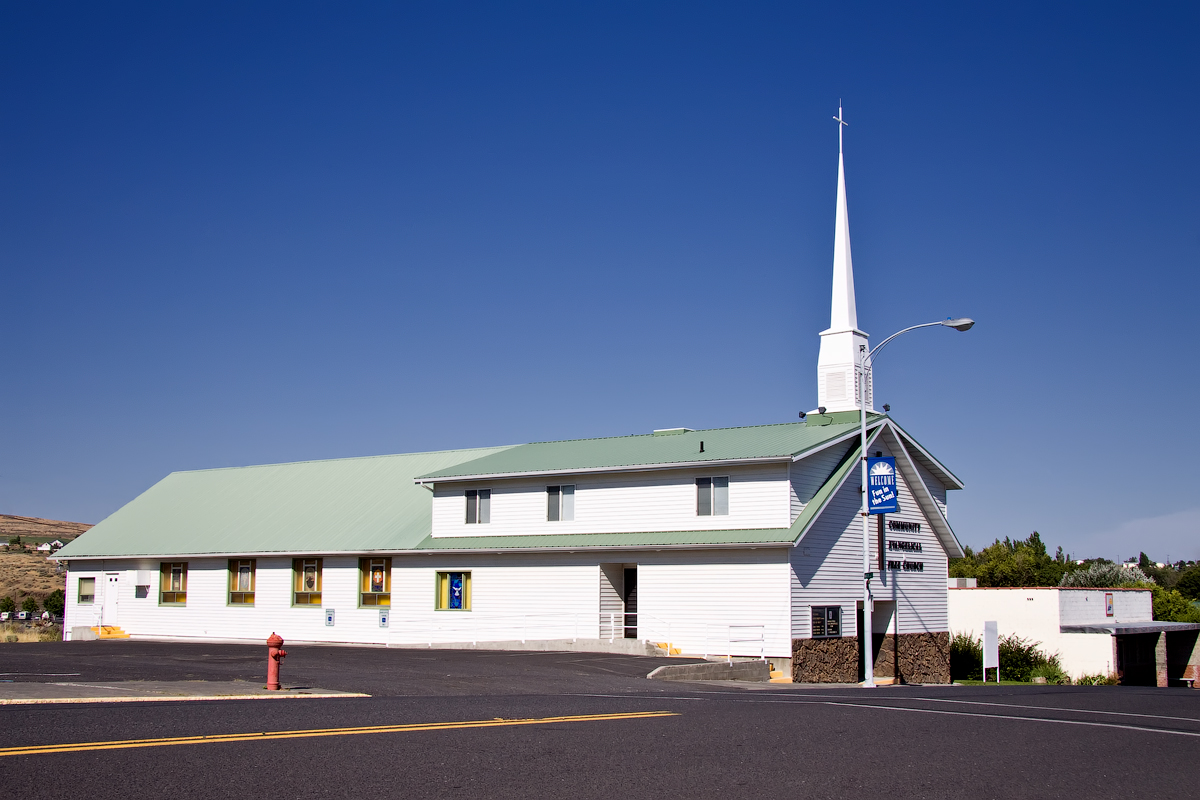
Community Evangelical Free Church of Soap Lake, Washington

The Evangelical Covenant Church and the Evangelical Free Church are denominations in the Radical Pietistic tradition that were founded by Scandinavian immigrants to the Americas (see Mission Friends). They, along with other Radical Pietistic churches, founded the International Federation of Free Evangelical Churches as an association of denominations around the world that "share the same Pietist approach to the faith and accept the Bible as their only creed".

=== Mennonite Brethren ===
The Mennonite Brethren Church emerged among Russian Mennonites who accepted Radical Pietism. The belief in evangelism heralded by Radical Pietists causes the Mennonite Brethren to be characterized by their emphasis on missionary work. As with other Radical Pietists, the Mennonite Brethren emphasize a personal conversion experience.

=== River Brethren ===
==== Brethren in Christ Church and Calvary Holiness Church ====
The Brethren in Christ Church emerged in Lancaster County after a group of Mennonites came under the influence of Radical Pietistic preachers who "emphasized spiritual passion and a warm, personal relationship to Jesus Christ." They teach "the necessity of a crisis-conversion experience" as well as the existence of a second work of grace that "results in the believer resulting in the ability to say no to sin". The Brethren in Christ Church entered into a schism in 1964 resulting in the formation of the Calvary Holiness Church, which continues to emphasize the wearing of a headcovering by women, plain dress, temperance, footwashing, and pacifism. Calvary Holiness Church is considered to be a part of the conservative holiness movement.

==== Old Order River Brethren ====
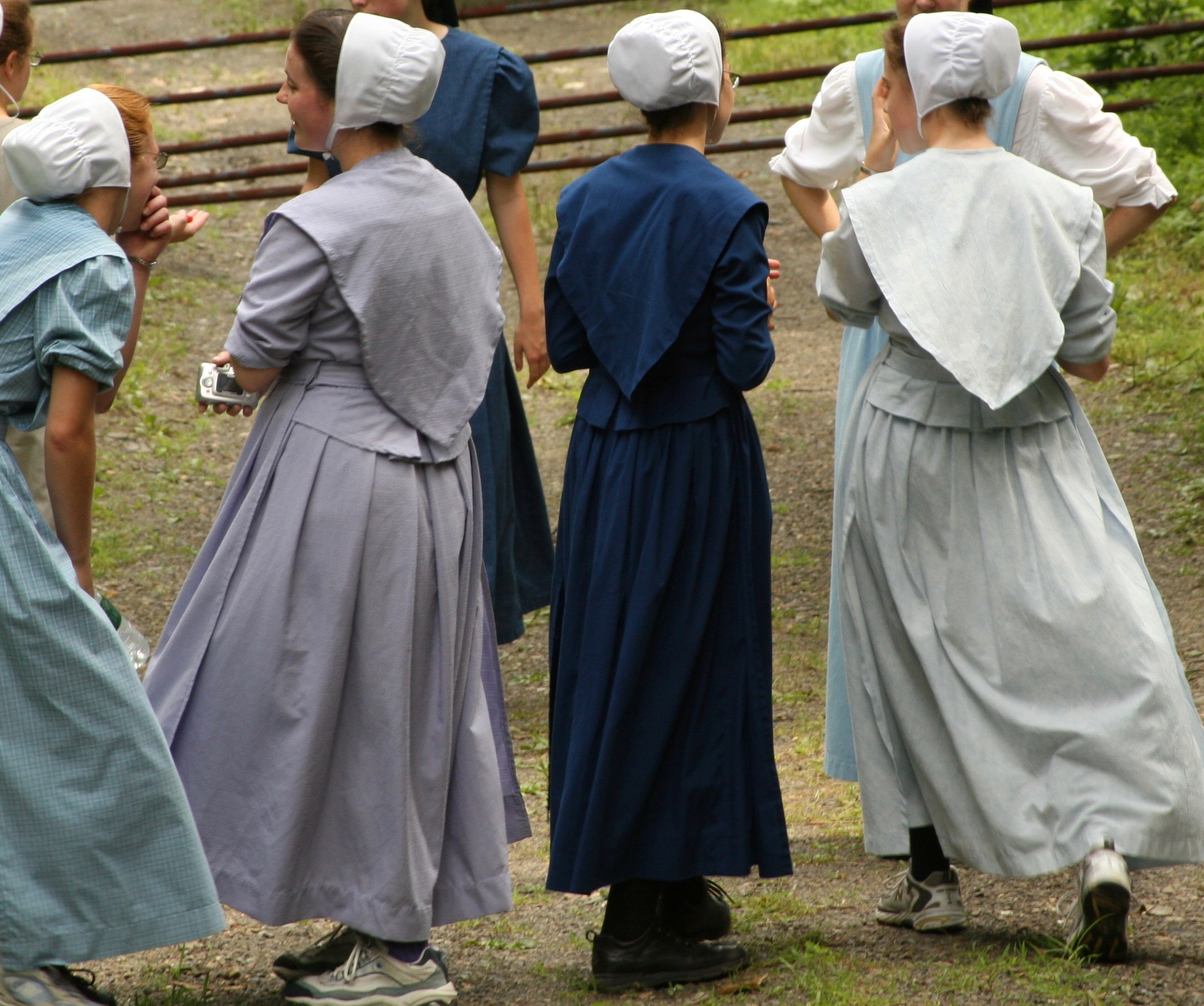
Women belonging to the Old Order River Brethren, an Anabaptist denomination in the Radical Pietistic tradition

The Old Order River Brethren are an Anabaptist group in the Radical Pietistic tradition who are distinguished by their practice of plain dress and abstaining from what they see as worldly entertainment, such as television sets. The Old Order River Brethren separated from other streams of the River Brethren (the Brethren in Christ and the United Zion Church) to herald the doctrines of nonresistance and nonconformity to the world; it is the most conservative in the River Brethren tradition. The River Brethren hold experience meetings, in which "members [are seen] testifying of God's work in their lives in bringing them to salvation and daily living." When members have a conversion experience, they begin to take part in the experience meeting and later request baptism.

==== United Zion Church ====
The United Zion Church is a Radical Pietist denomination in the Anabaptist, specifically River Brethren, tradition. It separated from the mainstem of the River Brethren due to its allowance of meetinghouses, rather than worshipping in homes.

=== Schwarzenau Brethren ===
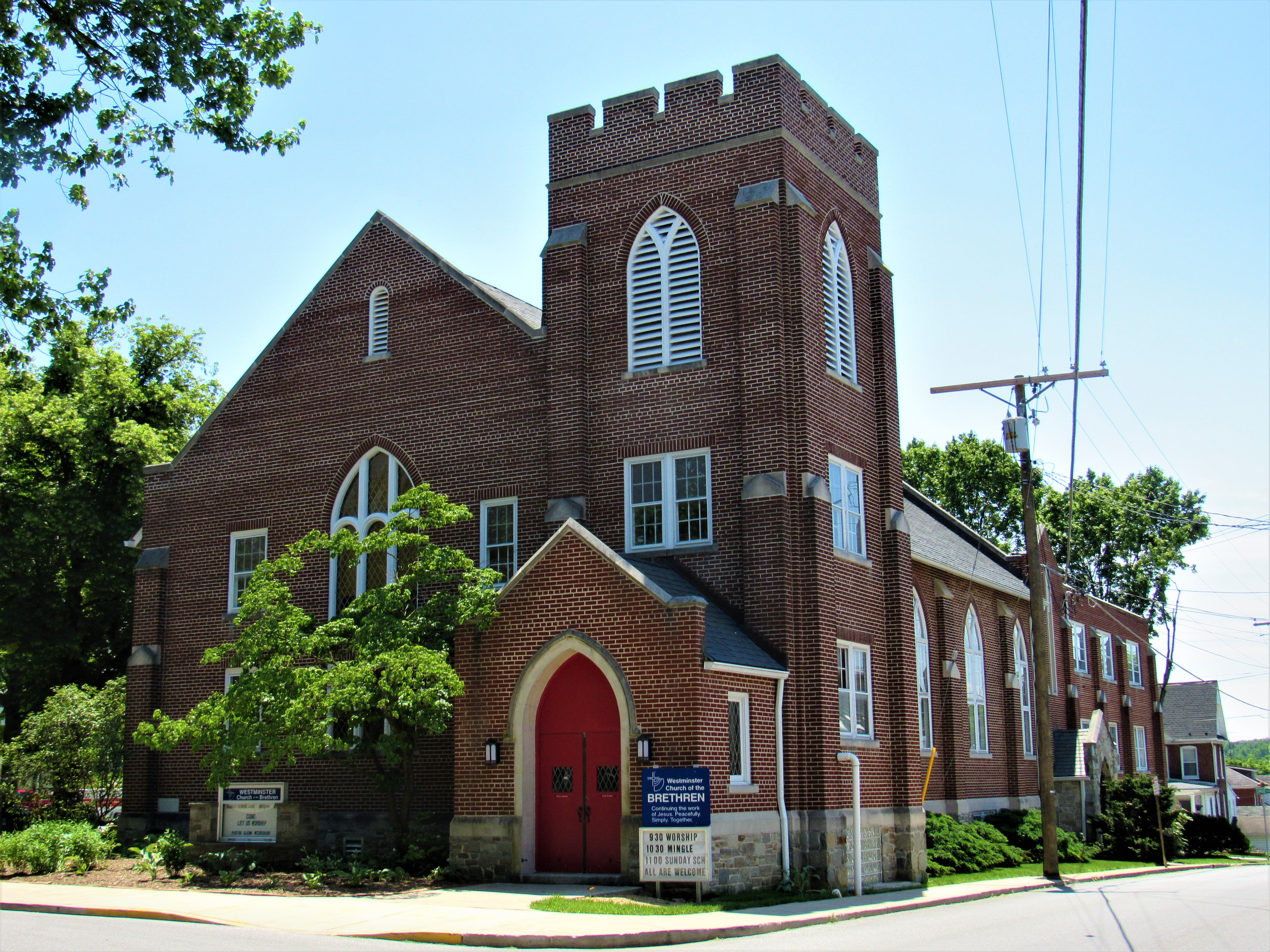
A church belonging to the Church of the Brethren, a Schwarzenau Brethren denomination that is a part of the Radical Pietistic tradition.

A Radical Pietistic community known as the Schwarzenau Brethren originated in 1708; Schwarzenau Brethren include Old Order Schwarzenau Brethren, conservative Schwarzenau Brethren—the Dunkard Brethren Church, and mainline Schwarzenau Brethren (the Church of the Brethren and The Brethren Church). They are known for their frequent celebration of the lovefeast, which for them consists of footwashing, supper, the holy kiss, and the Eucharist.

=== Temple Society ===
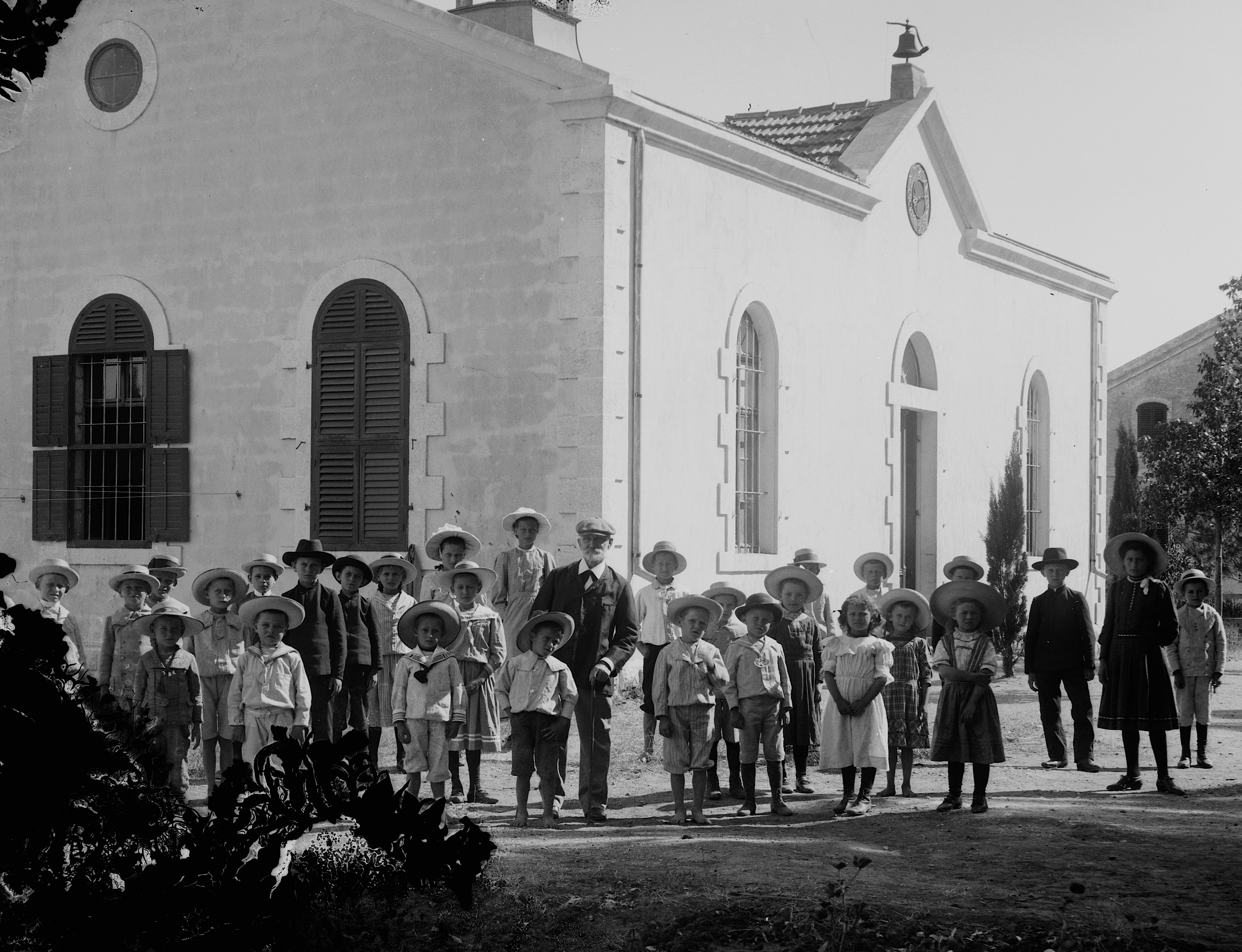
Templers, a Radical Pietistic community that lived in Palestine before being relocated to Australia.

The Templers are a Radical Pietistic community that emerged in Germany. They promote small groups to study the Bible and emphasize preparing for the Second Coming of Christ. Many Templers migrated to Russia, Palestine, and later to Australia where the Church is known as the Temple Society Australia.

== Communitarian living ==
A common trait among some radical Pietists is that they formed communities where they sought to revive the original Christian living of the Acts of the Apostles. Other Radical Pietists "preferred a largely solitary life of prayer, living in modest cottages or even more primitive dwellings in the hills outside of the town."

Jean de Labadie (1610–1674) founded a communitarian group in Europe which was known, after its founder, as the Labadists. Johannes Kelpius (1673–1708) led a communitarian group who came to America from Germany in 1694. Conrad Beissel (1691–1768), founder of another early pietistic communitarian group, the Ephrata Cloister, was also particularly affected by Radical Pietism's emphasis on personal experience and separation from false Christianity. The Harmony Society (1785–1906), founded by George Rapp, was another German-American religious group influenced by Radical Pietism. Other groups include the Zoarite Separatists (1817–1898), and the Amana Colonies (1855-today).

In Sweden, a group of radical pietists formed a community, the "Skevikare," on an island outside of Stockholm, where they lived much like the Ephrata people for nearly a century. Eric Jansson was another Swedish Radical Pietist who formed a separatist community, the utopian Bishop Hill Colony, after emigrating to Illinois.

Radical Pietism's role in the emergence of modern religious communities has only begun to be adequately assessed, according to Hans Schneider, professor of church history at the University of Marburg, Germany. However, that statement refers to the early era of Radical Pietism up to around 1715, and the later era has since been covered by numerous studies.

== Endtime expectations, breakdown of social barriers ==
Two other common traits of radical Pietists were their strong endtime expectations and their breakdown of social barriers. They were very influenced by prophecies gathered and published by John Amos Comenius and Gottfried Arnold. Events like comets and lunar eclipses were seen as signs of threatening divine judgements. In Pennsylvania, Johannes Kelpius even installed a telescope on the roof of his house, where he and his followers kept watch for heavenly signs proclaiming the return of Christ.

As for social barriers, the familiar pronoun thou (du) was commonly used among the radical Pietists in Germany and Sweden. They also strongly abandoned class designation and academic degrees. Some of the barriers between men and women were also broken down. Many radical Pietist women became well known as writers and prophets, as well as leaders of Philadelphian communities.

== Legacy ==
Radical Pietism heavily influenced the development of the Methodist Churches, as well as the Moravian Church.

Neo-Lutheranism was a Lutheran revival in reaction against Pietism, and the Pietist movement in Germany declined in the 19th century. Radical Pietism had an influence on Anglicanism, especially as practiced in the United States, because of German immigrants especially to Pennsylvania and, combined with the influences of Presbyterianism and Puritanism, eventually led to the development of the so-called Third Great Awakening and the emergence of radical Evangelicalism and Pentecostalism peculiar to Christianity in the United States as it developed during the late 19th to the early 20th centuries.

Karl Barth, who initially supported Pietism, later criticized radical Pietism as creating a move towards unorthodoxy.

John Milbank, speaking from the perspective of radical orthodoxy, sees his criticism as misguided by overlooking how the radical Pietists criticized modern philosophy from a theological perspective by questioning the legitimacy of philosophy as "autonomous reason," which ultimately led to the demise of Kantianism. That was later seen by Milbank as the impetus for the quick rise and failure of the defenses of critical reason by Fichte, Schelling, and Hegel. All of that is seen as culminating in the especially radical pietism in Kierkegaard, especially in his criticism of Hegel. Further, he saw the theological content of radical Pietism as forcing post-Kantian idealisms to remain somewhat theological and characterizing certain central elements of modern philosophy, including "the priority of existence over thought; the primacy of language; the 'ecstatic' character of time; the historicity of reason; the dialogical principle; the suspension of the ethical; and the ontological difference."

== See also ==
- Conservative Anabaptism
- Conservative Friends
- Conservative holiness movement
- Läsare
- Methodism
- Moravian Church
- Nyevangelism
- Unity of the Brethren (Texas)
- Assemblies of God in Brazil
- Fellowship of Christian Assemblies
- Mission Friends
