= Bruxy Cavey =

Canadian writer (born 1965)

- Teaching pastor (former)
- Church: The Meeting House
- In office: 1997–2022
- Other posts: Author of The End of Religion and Reunion

Personal details
- Born: Timothy Bruce Cavey; February 21, 1965 (age 61) Montreal, Quebec, Canada
- Denomination: Anabaptism (Be in Christ Church of Canada) (credentials revoked)
- Occupation: Author, former pastor
- Education: York University; Tyndale University

Timothy Bruce Cavey (born 1965), known as Bruxy Cavey, is a Canadian author and former pastor. He is the author of The End of Religion and Reunion. Cavey has been a guest professor teaching university-level courses around North America, particularly Tyndale University, Messiah College, and Fresno Pacific University Biblical Seminary. He was a pastor at The Meeting House church in Oakville, Ontario, for 25 years, but was asked to resign from his role as teaching pastor in March 2022 after a third-party investigation revealed his years-long sexual abuse of a member of his church. According to the Toronto Star, a church official stated that the investigation found his conduct to be an abuse of power and that it amounted to sexual harassment. In June 2022, Cavey was arrested and charged with sexual assault.

== Early life ==
Born in 1965, Cavey was one of five children. After his family moved to Toronto, he was enrolled in People's Church Christian Academy. In the 1980s, Cavey participated in street evangelism, including via preaching, acting out skits, break dancing and performance art. Cavey started his own performing group, "4 Crying Out Loud!" with similar style to his street evangelism days.

== Education and ministry ==
Cavey attended York University, graduating with a Bachelor of Arts degree in psychology. At Ontario Theological Seminary, now Tyndale University, he obtained a master's degree in theological studies. After seminary he worked for World Vision as a speaker, promoting and fundraising for the organization. In 1991, Cavey became the pastor of Heritage Fellowship Baptist Church in Ancaster after he had spoken there while promoting World Vision. The church grew from under 200 to over 1100 attendees during his tenure.

=== The Meeting House ===
In 1997, Cavey became the senior pastor at Upper Oaks Community Church based in Oakville, Ontario. The church grew over 35 percent annually and hired more pastoral staff, so Cavey transitioned into a teaching pastor role. During that time the church's name was changed to The Meeting House to reflect the denomination's Anabaptist roots. By 2002, The Meeting House was overcrowded, and they had to set up an overflow area with a screen. Church members who travelled from neighbouring cities requested support to watch the service on a screen in their home town. A plan was set in motion to create the church's first regional site in Hamilton, Ontario. Each parish had their own staff and live music, showing the sermon from the week before at the main site in Oakville. Cavey and the Meeting House had a broad international following through Cavey's Twitter, blog, and the church's free sermon resources including podcasts and downloadable videos of sermons and content.

== Alleged sexual abuse, sexual misconduct and sexual assault ==
Cavey was accused of sexual abuse and subsequently placed on leave of absence from his role as teaching pastor in December 2021. After the conclusion of an independent investigation into his conduct, the Meeting House Board forced Cavey's resignation on March 3, 2022. The investigation into Cavey's conduct determined that he had sexually harassed a member of his congregation, and this started in a "pastoral counselling relationship" and lasted for "a number of years". The investigation concluded that Cavey "abused his power and authority". Cavey's pastoral credentials were also revoked by his denomination, the Be in Christ Church of Canada. On March 19, 2022, the church announced that two more people had made allegations against Cavey. On August 14, 2022, the church clarified that "the actions substantiated in the first investigation constitute sexual abuse by a church leader" and apologised to the first victim for not publicly identifying Cavey's abuse in March 2022. The findings of the investigations into the additional allegations provided that "two sets of claims of sexual abuse by a church leader have been substantiated" and the third claim was found to be substantiated as "sexual misconduct". The investigations revealed that one of his victims was underaged when the abuse took place.

On June 6, 2022, the Hamilton Police Service announced it had arrested Cavey on May 31, 2022, and charged him with Sexual Assault. He was released with conditions and appeared in court June 27, 2022. On August 13, 2022, a detailed account of his abuse of one of his victims was published.

Cavey published a confession on his blog and hired Megan Savard, the lawyer who represented former Hedley frontman Jacob Hoggard, to defend him. His trial was scheduled for February 2024. On July 22, 2024, the first of three sexual assault charges against Cavey, was stayed after a two-year delay, with Justice Michael K. Wendl ruling that the lengthy delay violated Cavey's right to a timely trial. This decision was based on defense arguments citing the Charter of Rights and Freedoms' stipulations for trial timelines. The other two charges were withdrawn as the crown did not feel there was a reasonable chance of conviction.

== Books ==
In 2007 Cavey published his best-known book, The End of Religion. In it Cavey argues that Jesus was abolishing religion, rather than establishing a new one, and explores the implications for Christians today. In 2020 he published an updated version with five new chapters. In 2017 he published Reunion: The Good News of Jesus for Seekers, Saints, and Sinners.

=== Published works ===
- The End of Religion: Encountering the Subversive Spirituality of Jesus (2007) ISBN 1-6000-6067-6
- (re)union: The Good News of Jesus for Seekers, Saints, and Sinners (2017) ISBN 1-5138-0139-2
- The End of Religion: Encountering the Subversive Spirituality of Jesus | Expanded Edition (2020) ISBN 1-5138-0550-9
