= Methodism =

Denomination of Protestant Christianity

Methodism, also called the Methodist movement, is a Protestant Christian tradition whose origins, doctrines and practice derive from the life and teachings of John Wesley. George Whitefield and John's brother Charles Wesley were also significant early leaders in the movement. They were named Methodists for "the methodical way in which they carried out their Christian faith". Methodism originated as a revival movement within the Church of England in the 18th century, though Methodism diverged from Anglicanism and became a separate denomination after Wesley's death. The evangelical movement spread throughout the British Empire, the United States and beyond due to vigorous missionary work, and today has about 50 million adherents worldwide. (Note: This figure reported in 2013 is an estimate by the World Methodist Council and includes members of united and uniting churches with Methodist participation. It represents approximately 60 million committed members and a further 20 million adherents.) Most Methodist denominations are members of the World Methodist Council. (Note: In Methodist nomenclature, denominational bodies are customarily referred to as "connexions" or "connections".)

Wesleyan theology, formulated by John Wesley and codified by the systematic theologian John William Fletcher, is upheld by the Wesleyan Methodist denominations; it focuses on sanctification and the transforming effect of the Holy Spirit on the character of a Christian, exemplified by living a victorious life over sin. Unique to Wesleyan Methodism is its definition of sin: a "voluntary transgression of a known law of God." Distinguishing doctrines include the new birth, imparted righteousness, and obedience to God manifested in performing works of piety. John Wesley held that entire sanctification was "the grand depositum", or foundational doctrine, of the Methodist faith, and its propagation was the reason God brought Methodists into existence. Methodists hold that the witness of the Holy Spirit assures the believer of having experienced the new birth, as well as entire sanctification. Scripture is considered the primary authority, but Methodists also look to Christian tradition, including the historic creeds. Wesleyan Methodists teach that Jesus Christ, the Son of God, died for all of humanity and that salvation is achievable for all. This is the Arminian doctrine, (Note: Arminianism is named after Jacobus Arminius, a Dutch theologian who was trained to preach Calvinism but concluded that some aspects of Calvinism had to be modified in the light of Scripture. Arminians as well as Calvinists appeal to Scripture and the early Church Fathers to support their respective views, however the differences remain – Arminianism holds to the role of free will in salvation and rejects the doctrines of predestination and unconditional election. John Wesley was perhaps the clearest English proponent of Arminian theology.) as opposed to the Calvinist position that God has predestined the salvation of a select group of people. However, Whitefield and several other early leaders of the movement were considered Calvinistic Methodists and held to the Calvinist position.

The movement has a wide variety of forms of worship, ranging from high church to low church in liturgical usage, in addition to tent revivals and camp meetings held at certain times of the year. Denominations that descend from the British Methodist tradition are generally less ritualistic, while worship in American Methodism varies depending on the Methodist denomination and congregation. Methodist worship distinctiveness includes the observance of the quarterly lovefeast, the watchnight service on New Year's Eve, as well as altar calls in which people are invited to experience the new birth and entire sanctification. Services of worship may include the opportunity for congregants to share prayer requests, praise reports, and salvation testimonies. Its emphasis on growing in grace after the new birth (and after being entirely sanctified) led to the creation of class meetings for encouragement in the Christian life. Methodism is known for its rich musical tradition, and Charles Wesley was instrumental in writing much of the hymnody of Methodism.

In addition to evangelism, Methodism is known for its charity, as well as support for the sick, the poor, and the afflicted through works of mercy that "flow from the love of God and neighbor" evidenced in the entirely sanctified believer. These ideals, the Social Gospel, are put into practice by the establishment of hospitals, orphanages, soup kitchens, and schools to follow Christ's command to spread the gospel and serve all people. Methodists are historically known for their adherence to the doctrine of nonconformity to the world, reflected by their traditional standards of a commitment to sobriety, prohibition of gambling, regular attendance at class meetings, and weekly observance of the Friday fast.

Early Methodists were drawn from all levels of society, including the aristocracy, (Note: This social analysis is a summary of a wide variety of books on Methodist history, articles in The Methodist Magazine, etc. Most of the Methodist aristocracy were associated with Selina Hastings, Countess of Huntingdon, who invited Methodist preachers to gatherings that she hosted. Methodists were leaders among Christians at that time who reached out to the poorest of the working classes. A number of soldiers were also Methodists.) but the Methodist preachers took the message to social outcasts such as criminals. In Britain, the Methodist Church had a major effect in the early decades of the developing working class (1760–1820). In the United States, it became the religion of many slaves, who later formed black churches in the Methodist tradition.

== History ==
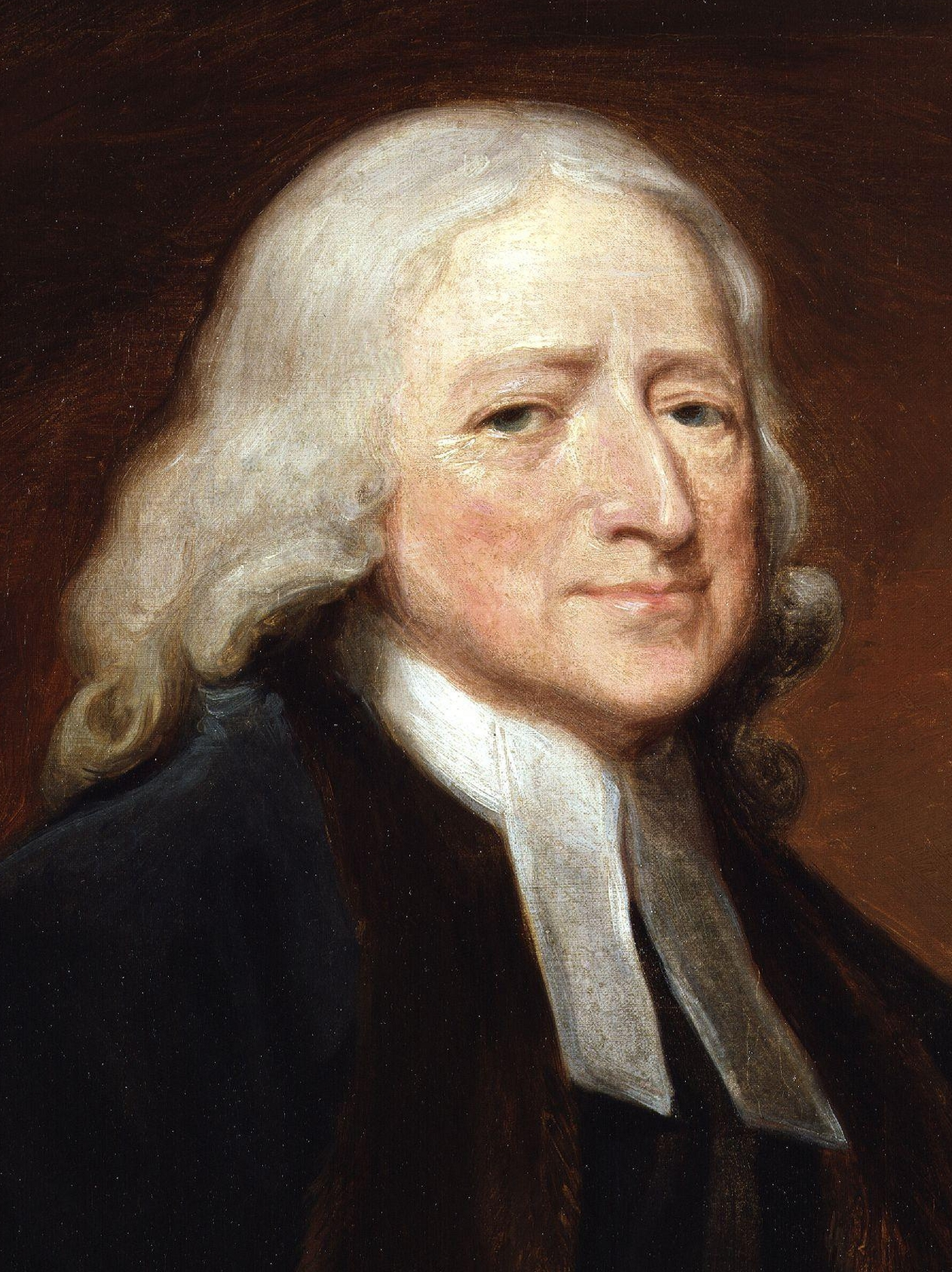
John Wesley

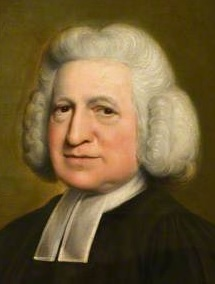
Charles Wesley

=== Development until John Wesley's death ===
The Methodist revival began in England with a group of men, including John Wesley (1703–1791) and his younger brother Charles Wesley (1707–1788), as a movement within the Church of England in the 18th century. The Wesley brothers founded the "Holy Club" at the University of Oxford, where John was a fellow and later a lecturer at Lincoln College. The club met weekly and they systematically set about living a holy life. They were accustomed to receiving Communion every week, fasting regularly, abstaining from most forms of amusement and luxury, and frequently visiting the sick and the poor and prisoners. The fellowship were branded as "Methodist" by their fellow students because of the way they used "rule" and "method" in their religious affairs.

In 1735, at the invitation of the founder of the Georgia Colony, General James Oglethorpe, both John and Charles Wesley set out for North America to be ministers to the colonists and missionaries to the Native Americans. Unsuccessful in their work, the brothers returned to England conscious of their lack of genuine Christian faith.

They sought help from Peter Boehler and other members of the Moravian Church. At a Moravian service in Aldersgate on 24 May 1738, John Wesley experienced what has come to be called his evangelical conversion, when he felt his "heart strangely warmed". He records in his journal: "I felt I did trust in Christ, Christ alone, for salvation; and an assurance was given me that He had taken away my sins, even mine, and saved me from the law of sin and death." Charles Wesley had reported a similar experience a few days previously. Considering this a pivotal moment, Daniel L. Burnett writes: "The significance of [John] Wesley's Aldersgate Experience is monumental ... Without it, the names of Wesley and Methodism would likely be nothing more than obscure footnotes in the pages of church history." The following year, John Wesley left the Moravians and founded the Methodist Societies of England. The yearly anniversary of his experience is celebrated by Methodists on Aldersgate Day. Wesley's Chapel, in nearby City Road, remains a major focal point of the worldwide Methodist charismatic movement.

The Wesley brothers immediately began to preach salvation by faith to individuals and groups, in houses, in religious societies, and in the few churches which had not closed their doors to evangelical preachers. John Wesley came under the influence of the Dutch theologian Jacobus Arminius (1560–1609). Arminius had rejected the Calvinist teaching that God had predestined an elect number of people to eternal bliss while others perished eternally. Conversely, George Whitefield (1714–1770), Howell Harris (1714–1773), and Selina Hastings, Countess of Huntingdon (1707–1791) were notable for being Calvinistic Methodists.

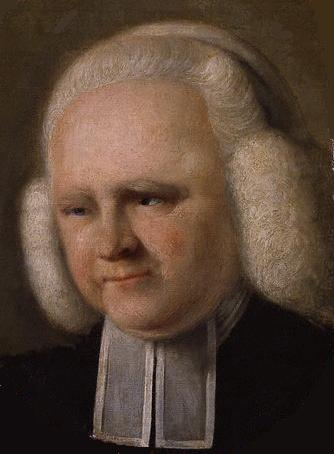
George Whitefield

Returning from his mission in Georgia, George Whitefield joined the Wesley brothers in what was rapidly becoming a national crusade. Whitefield, who had been a fellow student of the Wesleys and prominent member of the Holy Club at Oxford, became well known for his unorthodox, itinerant ministry, in which he was dedicated to open-air preaching – reaching crowds of thousands. A key step in the development of John Wesley's ministry was, like Whitefield, to preach in fields, collieries, and churchyards to those who did not regularly attend parish church services. Accordingly, many Methodist converts were those disconnected from the Church of England; Wesley remained a cleric of the Established Church and insisted that Methodists attend their local parish church as well as Methodist meetings because only an ordained minister could perform the sacraments of Baptism and Holy Communion.

Faced with growing evangelistic and pastoral responsibilities, Wesley and Whitefield appointed lay preachers and leaders. Methodist preachers focused particularly on evangelising people who had been "neglected" by the established Church of England. Wesley and his assistant preachers organized the new converts into Methodist societies. These societies were divided into groups called classes – intimate meetings where individuals were encouraged to confess their sins to one another and to build up each other. They also took part in love feasts which allowed for the sharing of testimony, a key feature of early Methodism. Growth in numbers and increasing hostility impressed upon the revival converts a deep sense of their corporate identity. Three teachings that Methodists saw as the foundation of Christian faith were:

1. People are all, by nature, "dead in sin".
2. They are justified by faith alone.
3. Faith produces inward and outward holiness.

Wesley's organisational skills soon established him as the primary leader of the movement. Whitefield was a Calvinist, whereas Wesley was an outspoken opponent of the doctrine of predestination. Wesley argued (against Calvinist doctrine) that Christians could enjoy a second blessing – entire sanctification (Christian perfection) in this life: loving God and their neighbours, meekness and lowliness of heart and abstaining from all appearance of evil. These differences put strains on the alliance between Whitefield and Wesley, with Wesley becoming hostile toward Whitefield in what had been previously close relations. Whitefield consistently begged Wesley not to let theological differences sever their friendship, and, in time, their friendship was restored, though this was seen by many of Whitefield's followers to be a doctrinal compromise.

Many clergy in the established church feared that new doctrines promulgated by the Methodists, such as the necessity of a new birth for salvation – the first work of grace, of justification by faith and of the constant and sustained action of the Holy Spirit upon the believer's soul, would produce ill effects upon weak minds. Theophilus Evans, an early critic of the movement, even wrote that it was "the natural Tendency of their Behaviour, in Voice and Gesture and horrid Expressions, to make People mad". In one of his prints, William Hogarth likewise attacked Methodists as "enthusiasts" full of "Credulity, Superstition, and Fanaticism". Other attacks against the Methodists were physically violent – Wesley was nearly murdered by a mob at Wednesbury in 1743. The Methodists responded vigorously to their critics and thrived despite the attacks against them.

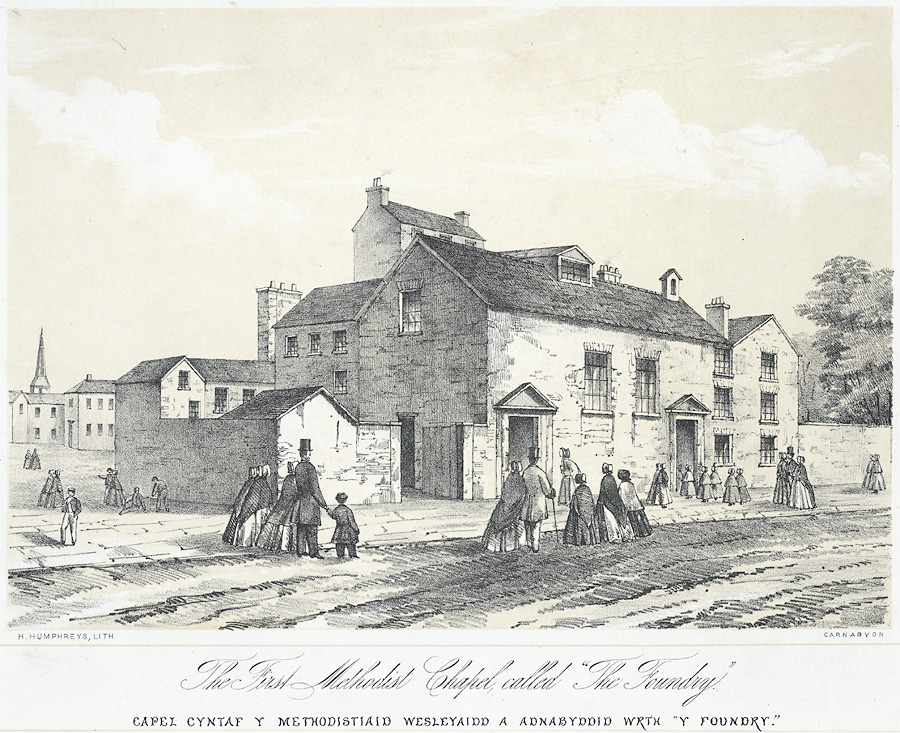
The first Methodist chapel, "The Foundery", London

Initially, the Methodists merely sought reform within the Church of England (Anglicanism), but the movement gradually departed from that Church. George Whitefield's preference for extemporaneous prayer rather than the fixed forms of prayer in the Book of Common Prayer, in addition to his insistence on the necessity of the new birth, set him at odds with Anglican clergy. By the 1760s, Methodism and Evangelical Anglicanism diverged, with differences between the two traditions becoming "distinctly apparent."

As Methodist societies multiplied, and elements of an ecclesiastical system were, one after another, adopted, the breach between John Wesley and the Church of England gradually widened. In 1784, Wesley responded to the shortage of priests in the American colonies due to the American Revolutionary War by ordaining preachers for America with the power to administer the sacraments. Wesley's actions precipitated the split between American Methodists and the Church of England (which held that only bishops could ordain people to ministry).

With regard to the position of Methodism within Christendom, "John Wesley once noted that what God had achieved in the development of Methodism was no mere human endeavor but the work of God. As such it would be preserved by God so long as history remained." Calling it "the grand depositum" of the Methodist faith, Wesley specifically taught that the propagation of the doctrine of entire sanctification was the reason that God raised up the Methodists in the world. In light of this, Methodists traditionally promote the motto "Holiness unto the Lord".

John William Fletcher became one of the key teachers of Methodist theology when he immigrated to England and became an Anglican minister; he is known as Methodism's systematic theologian. He was also instrumental in leading the Methodist movement. Fletcher referred to the second work of grace—entire sanctification—as the baptism in the Holy Spirit. On the baptism with the Holy Spirit, Fletcher wrote:

Lastly: if we will attain the full power of godliness, and be peaceable as the Prince of Peace, and merciful as our heavenly Father, let us go on to the perfection and glory of Christianity; let us enter the full dispensation of the Spirit. Till we live in the pentecostal glory of the Church: till we are baptized with the Holy Ghost: till the Spirit of burning and the fire of Divine love have melted us down, and we have been truly cast into the softest mould of the Gospel: till we can say with St. Paul, "We have received the Spirit of love, of power, and of a sound mind;" till then we shall be carnal rather than spiritual believers.

He was John Wesley's choice of successor to the Methodist movement, but died before Wesley. At the time of Wesley's death in 1791, there were over 500 Methodist preachers in British colonies and the new United States. Total membership of the Methodist societies in Britain was recorded as 56,000 that year, rising to 360,000 in 1836 and 1,463,000 by the national census of 1851.

=== Subsequent developments ===
Early Methodism experienced a radical and spiritual phase that allowed women authority in church leadership. The role of the woman preacher emerged from the sense that the home should be a place of community care and should foster personal growth. Methodist women formed a community that cared for the vulnerable, extending the role of mothering beyond physical care. Women were encouraged to testify their faith. However, the centrality of women's role sharply diminished after 1790 as Methodist churches became more structured and more male-dominated.

The Wesleyan Education Committee, which existed from 1838 to 1902, has documented the Methodist Church's involvement in the education of children. At first, most effort was placed in creating Sunday Schools. Still, in 1836 the British Methodist Conference gave its blessing to the creation of "Weekday schools".

Methodism has emphasized evangelism and missions. Wesleyan theology stresses missional living as normative for Methodist Christians. In particular, ordinands were asked by John Wesley "Will you visit from house to house?" with the assumed answer being "yes" as door-to-door evangelism was the expectation of Methodist clergy for the purpose of reaching people outside the walls of churches. Methodists have widely employed the use of Gospel tracts to disseminate the faith, with many of these Gospel tracts being focused on the New Birth. In 1894, the Methodist Episcopal Church published an encouragement for the faithful to use Gospel tracts, and for the faithful to support their publication: "The tract is a miniature Gospel, and the Gospel has been committed to the care of the Church." Additionally, Wesleyan Methodist literature, including texts published from the onset of the holiness movement, such as Sanctification by Beverly Francis Carradine (1890), Helps to Holiness by Samuel Logan Brengle (1896), My Utmost for His Highest by Oswald Chambers (1924), and Conditional Security (1985), has aided in the spread of the faith. Methodism spread throughout the British Empire and, mostly through Whitefield's preaching during what historians call the First Great Awakening (Evangelical Revival), in colonial America and in Britain. However, after Whitefield's death in 1770, American Methodism became decisively Wesleyan and Arminian. Revival services and camp meetings were used "for spreading the Methodist message", with Francis Asbury stating that they were "our harvest seasons". Henry Boehm reported that at a camp meeting in Dover in 1805, 1100 persons received the New Birth and 600 believers were entirely sanctified. Around the time of John Swanel Inskip's leadership of the National Camp Meeting Association for the Promotion of Christian Holiness in the mid to latter 1800s, 80 percent of the membership of the North Georgia Conference of the Methodist Episcopal Church, South professed being entirely sanctified.

The Methodist Missionary Society, formed in 1932 following Methodist Union in Great Britain, was influential is establishing the spread of Methodism in a number of countries (see Contemporary Methodist denominations below). Premises at 25 Marylebone Road in London, which later became Methodist Church House, were built in 1939 for the Methodist Missionary Society to foster the commissioning and reception of Mission Partners from many countries. (Note: The archive of the Methodist Missionary Society is held at the School of Oriental and African Studies in London.)

== Theology ==
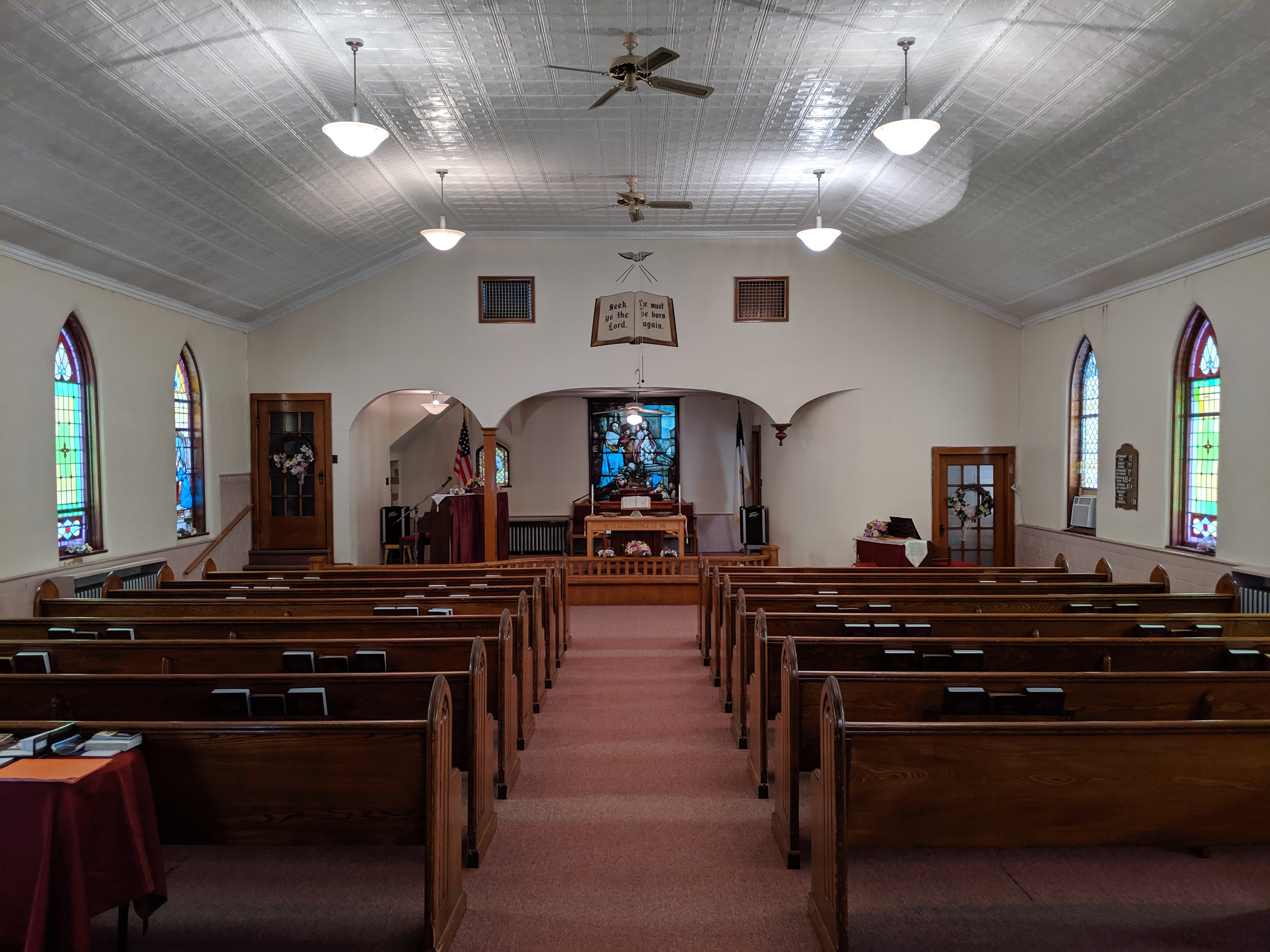
Artwork on the chancel arch of White Memorial Wesleyan Methodist Church in Struthers depicting the biblical verse on the New Birth (first work of grace): "Ye must be born again" (John 3:7), a core Methodist doctrine.

A traditional summary of Methodist teaching

All need to be saved.
All may be saved.
All may know themselves saved.
All may be saved to the uttermost.

— Catechism for the Use of the People Called Methodists.

Many Wesleyan Methodist bodies, such as the African Methodist Episcopal Church and the United Methodist Church, base their doctrinal standards on the Articles of Religion, John Wesley's abridgment of the Thirty-nine Articles of the Church of England that excised its Calvinist features. Some Methodist denominations also publish catechisms, which concisely summarise Christian doctrine. Methodists generally accept the Apostles' Creed and the Nicene Creed as declarations of shared Christian faith. Methodism affirms the traditional Christian belief in the triune Godhead (Father, Son and Holy Spirit) as well as the orthodox understanding of the person of Jesus Christ as God incarnate who is both fully divine and fully human. Methodism also emphasizes doctrines that indicate the power of the Holy Spirit to strengthen the faith of believers and to transform their personal lives.

Wesleyan Methodism is broadly evangelical in doctrine and is characterized by Wesleyan theology; John Wesley is studied by Methodists for his interpretation of church practice and doctrine. At its heart, the theology of John Wesley stressed the life of Christian holiness: to love God with all one's heart, mind, soul and strength and to love one's neighbour as oneself. One popular expression of Methodist doctrine is in the hymns of Charles Wesley. Since enthusiastic congregational singing was a part of the early evangelical movement, Wesleyan theology took root and spread through this channel. Martin V. Clarke, who documented the history of Methodist hymnody, states:

Theologically and doctrinally, the content of the hymns has traditionally been a primary vehicle for expressing Methodism's emphasis on salvation for all, social holiness, and personal commitment, while particular hymns and the communal act of participating in hymn singing have been key elements in the spiritual lives of Methodists.

=== Salvation ===
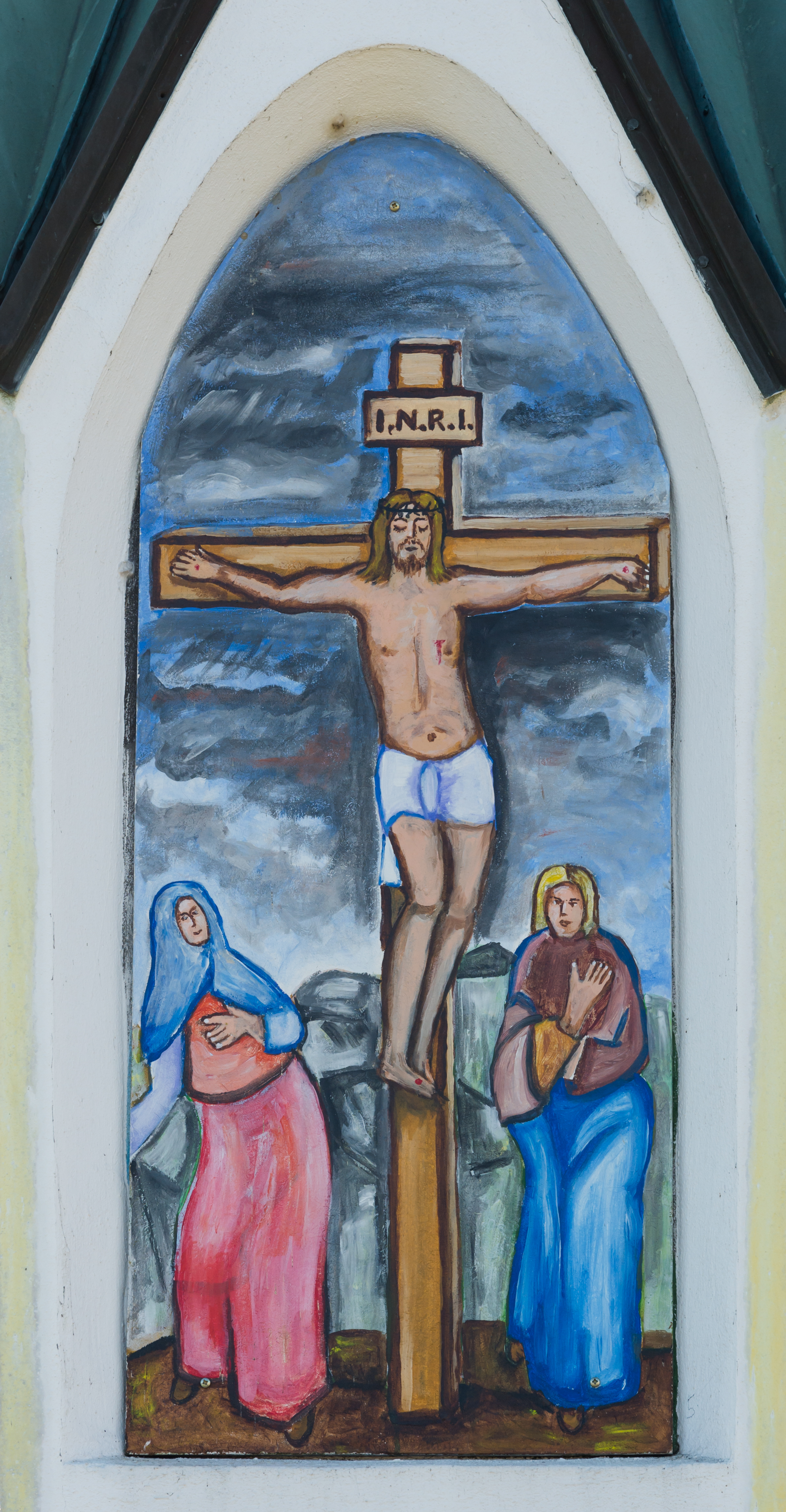
Methodists believe Jesus Christ died for all humanity, not a limited few: the doctrine of unlimited atonement.

Wesleyan Methodists identify with the Arminian conception of free will, as opposed to the theological determinism of absolute predestination. Methodism teaches that salvation is initiated when one chooses to respond to God, who draws the individual near to him (the Wesleyan doctrine of prevenient grace), thus teaching synergism. Wesleyan Methodists interpret Scripture as teaching that the saving work of Jesus Christ is for all people (unlimited atonement) but effective only to those who respond and believe, in accordance with the Reformation principles of sola gratia (grace alone) and sola fide (faith alone). John Wesley taught four key points fundamental to Methodism:

1. A person is free not only to reject salvation but also to accept it by an act of free will.
2. All people who are obedient to the gospel according to the measure of knowledge given them will be saved.
3. The Holy Spirit assures a Christian that they are justified by faith in Jesus (assurance of faith).
4. Christians in this life are capable of Christian perfection and are commanded by God to pursue it.

After the first work of grace (the new birth), Wesleyan Methodist soteriology emphasizes the importance of the pursuit of holiness in salvation, a concept best summarized in a quote by Methodist evangelist Phoebe Palmer who stated that "justification would have ended with me had I refused to be holy." Thus, for Wesleyan Methodists, "true faith ... cannot subsist without works." Methodist doctrine holds that the Christian life, subsequent to the New Birth (first work of grace), should be characterized by holy living, free from sin. Wesleyan Methodism, inclusive of the holiness movement, thus teaches that "justification [is made] conditional on obedience and progress in sanctification", emphasizing "a deep reliance upon Christ not only in coming to faith, but in remaining in the faith." John Wesley taught that the keeping of the moral law contained in the Ten Commandments, as well as engaging in the works of piety and the works of mercy, were "indispensable for our sanctification". In its categorization of sin, Methodist doctrine distinguishes between (1) "sin, properly so called" and (2) "involuntary transgression of a divine law, known or unknown"; the former category includes voluntary transgression against God, while the second category includes infirmities (such as "immaturity, ignorance, physical handicaps, forgetfulness, lack of discernment, and poor communication skills").

Wesley explains that those born of God do not sin habitually since to do so means that sin still reigns, which is a mark of an unbeliever. Neither does the Christian sin willfully since the believer's will is now set on living for Christ. He further claims that believers do not sin by desire because the heart has been thoroughly transformed to desire only God's perfect will. Wesley then addresses "sin by infirmities". Since infirmities involve no "concurrence of (the) will", such deviations, whether in thought, word, or deed, are not "properly" sin. He therefore concludes that those born of God do not commit sin, having been saved from "all their sins" (II.2, 7).

This is reflected in the Articles of Religion of the Free Methodist Church (emphasis added in italics), which uses the wording of John Wesley:

Justified persons, while they do not outwardly commit sin, are nevertheless conscious of sin still remaining in the heart. They feel a natural tendency to evil, a proneness to depart from God, and cleave to the things of earth. Those that are sanctified wholly are saved from all inward sin-from evil thoughts and evil tempers. No wrong temper, none contrary to love remains in the soul. All their thoughts, words, and actions are governed by pure love. Entire sanctification takes place subsequently to justification, and is the work of God wrought instantaneously upon the consecrated, believing soul. After a soul is cleansed from all sin, it is then fully prepared to grow in grace" (Discipline, "Articles of Religion", ch. i, § 1, p. 23).

Wesleyan Methodists also believe in the second work of grace – Christian perfection, also known as entire sanctification, which removes original sin, makes the believer holy and empowers them with power to wholly serve God. John Wesley explained, "entire sanctification, or Christian perfection, is neither more nor less than pure love; love expelling sin, and governing both the heart and life of a child of God. The Refiner's fire purges out all that is contrary to love." Methodist systematic theologian Daniel Steele noted "the possibility of instant and entire purification in this life" as a distinctive of the Methodist faith.

Wesleyan Methodist churches teach that apostasy can occur through a loss of faith or through sinning. If a person backslides but later decides to return to God, he or she must repent for sins and be entirely sanctified again (the Wesleyan-Arminian doctrine of conditional security).

=== Sacraments and rites ===
Methodists hold that sacraments are sacred acts of divine institution. Methodism has inherited its liturgy from Anglicanism, although Wesleyan theology tends to have a stronger "sacramental emphasis" than that held by evangelical Anglicans.

In common with most Protestants, Methodists recognize two sacraments as being instituted by Christ: Baptism and Holy Communion (also called the Lord's Supper). Most Methodist churches practice infant baptism, in anticipation of a response to be made later (confirmation), as well as baptism of believing adults. The Catechism for the Use of the People Called Methodists states that, "[in Holy Communion] Jesus Christ is present with his worshipping people and gives himself to them as their Lord and Saviour." In the United Methodist Church, the explanation of how Christ's presence is made manifest in the elements (bread and wine) is described as a "Holy Mystery". In certain Methodist connexions, such as the Missionary Methodist Church and the New Congregational Methodist Church, the rite of feetwashing is practiced at the time that the Lord's Supper is celebrated.

Methodist churches generally recognize sacraments to be a means of grace. John Wesley held that God also imparted grace by other established means such as public and private prayer, Scripture reading, study and preaching, public worship, and fasting; these constitute the works of piety. Wesley considered means of grace to be "outward signs, words, or actions ... to be the ordinary channels whereby [God] might convey to men, preventing [i.e., preparing], justifying or sanctifying grace." Specifically Methodist means, such as the class meetings, provided his chief examples for these prudential means of grace.

=== Sources of teaching ===
American Methodist theologian Albert Outler, in assessing John Wesley's own practices of theological reflection, proposes a methodology termed the "Wesleyan Quadrilateral". Wesley's Quadrilateral is referred to in Methodism as "our theological guidelines" and is taught to its ministers (clergy) in seminary as the primary approach to interpreting Scripture and gaining guidance for moral questions and dilemmas faced in daily living.

Traditionally, Methodists declare the Bible (Old and New Testaments) to be the only divinely inspired Scripture and the primary source of authority for Christians. The historic Methodist understanding of Scripture is based on the superstructure of Wesleyan covenant theology. Methodists also make use of tradition, drawing primarily from the teachings of the Church Fathers, as a secondary source of authority. Tradition may serve as a lens through which Scripture is interpreted. Theological discourse for Methodists almost always makes use of Scripture read inside the wider theological tradition of Christianity.

John Wesley contended that a part of the theological method would involve experiential faith. In other words, truth would be vivified in personal experience of Christians (overall, not individually), if it were really truth. And every doctrine must be able to be defended rationally. He did not divorce faith from reason. By reason, one asks questions of faith and seeks to understand God's action and will. Tradition, experience and reason, however, were subject always to Scripture, Wesley argued, because only there is the Word of God revealed "so far as it is necessary for our salvation."

== Prayer, worship, and liturgy ==
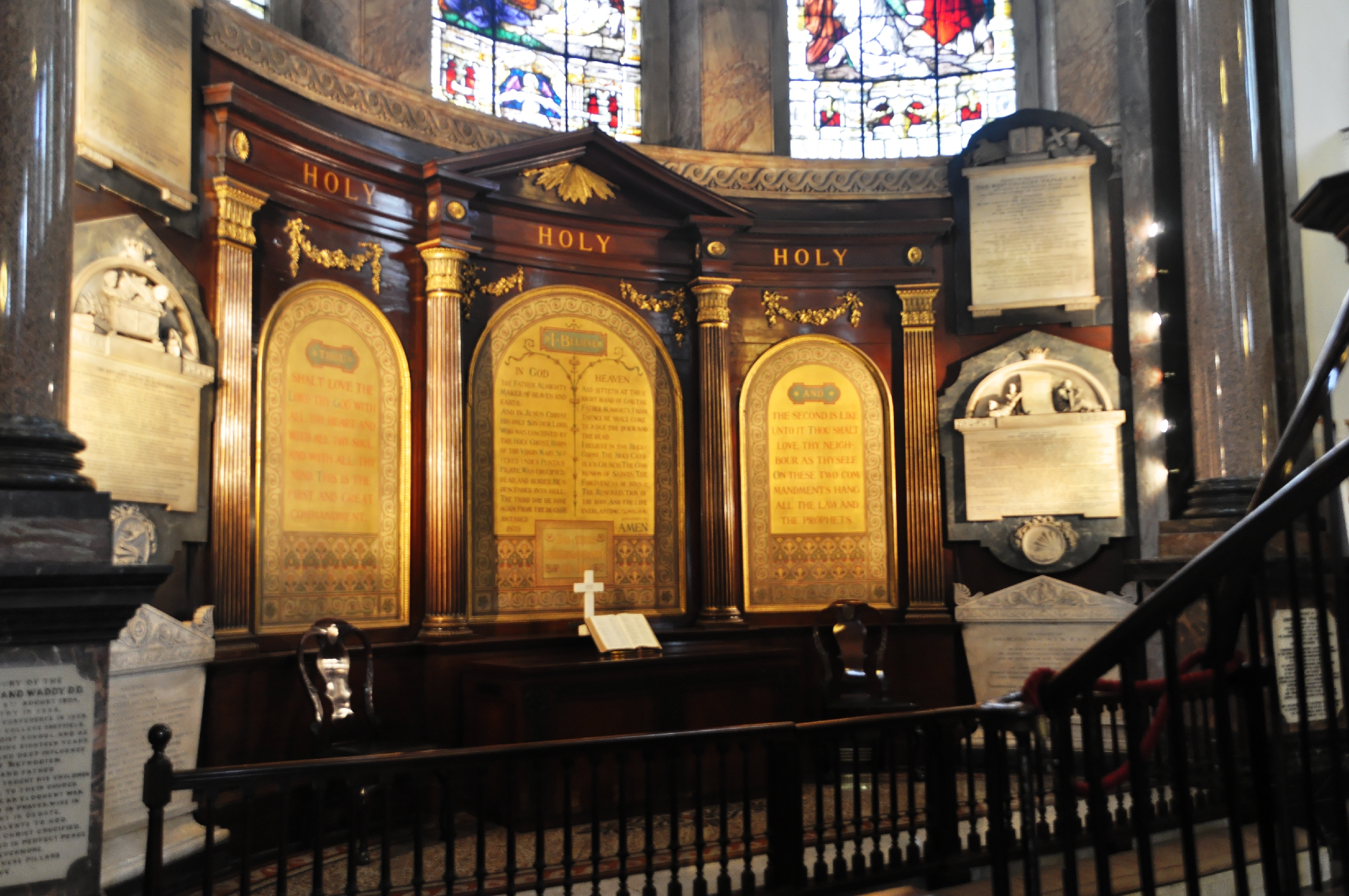
Communion table behind the rail in Wesley's Chapel, London

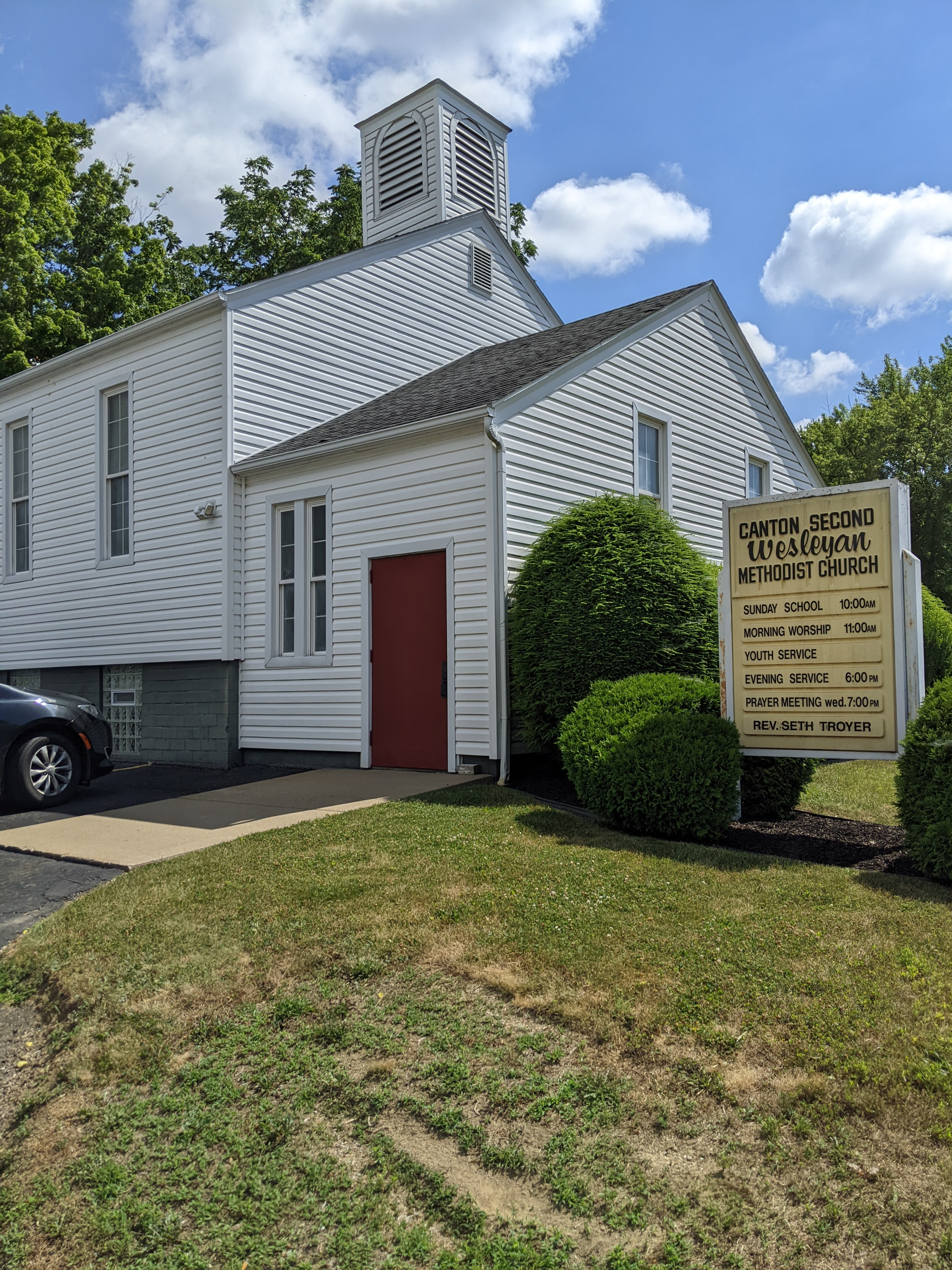
The sign of this Wesleyan Methodist church displays the times for the Sunday morning service of worship and Sunday evening service of worship, consistent with the historical first-day Sabbatarian doctrine of Methodism to hallow the Lord's Day. The midweek Wednesday prayer service is indicated on the sign as well.

With respect to public worship, Methodism was endowed by the Wesley brothers with worship characterised by a twofold practice: the ritual sacramental liturgy of the Book of Common Prayer on the one hand and the non-ritualistic preaching service on the other. This twofold practice became distinctive of Methodism because worship in the Church of England was based, by law, solely on the Book of Common Prayer and worship in the Nonconformist churches was almost exclusively that of "services of the word", i.e. preaching services, with Holy Communion being observed infrequently. John Wesley's influence meant that, in Methodism, the two practices were combined, a situation which remains characteristic of the tradition. Methodism has heavily emphasized "offerings of extempore and spontaneous prayer". To this end, Methodist revival services and camp meetings have been characterized by groaning and shouting, as people sought the fullness of salvation that Methodists taught to be embodied by the experience of entire sanctification. To outsiders, Wesleyans were labeled as "Shouting Methodists" due to their free expression during worship.

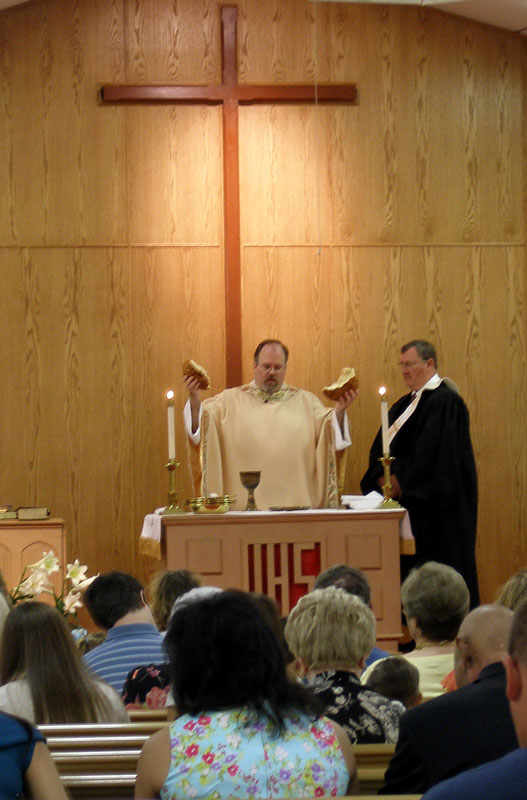
United Methodist minister breaking bread during a Communion service

Historically, Methodist churches have devoutly observed the Lord's Day (Sunday) with a morning service of worship, along with an evening service of worship (with the evening service being aimed at seekers and focusing on "singing, prayer, and preaching"); the holding of a midweek prayer meeting on Wednesday evenings has been customary. 18th-century Methodist church services were characterized by the following pattern: "preliminaries (e.g., singing, prayers, testimonies), to a 'message,' followed by an invitation to commitment", the latter of which took the form altar call—a practice that a remains "a vital part" of worship. A number of Methodist congregations devote a portion of their Sunday evening service and mid-week Wednesday evening prayer meeting to having congregants share their prayer requests, in addition to hearing personal testimonies about their faith and experiences in living the Christian life. After listening to various members of the congregation share their salvation testimonies, voice their prayer requests, and share their praise reports, congregants may kneel for intercessory prayer. The Lovefeast, traditionally practiced quarterly, was another practice that characterized early Methodism as John Wesley taught that it was an apostolic ordinance. Worship, hymnology, devotional and liturgical practices in Methodism were also influenced by Pietistic Lutheranism and, in turn, Methodist worship became influential in the Holiness movement.

Early Methodism was known for its "almost monastic rigors, its living by rule, [and] its canonical hours of prayer". It inherited from its Anglican patrimony the practice of reciting the Daily Office, which Methodist Christians were expected to pray. The first prayer book of Methodism, The Sunday Service of the Methodists with other occasional Services thus included the canonical hours of both Morning Prayer and Evening Prayer; these services were observed everyday in early Christianity, though on the Lord's Day, worship included the Eucharist. Later Methodist liturgical books, such as the Methodist Worship Book (1999) provide for Morning Prayer and Evening Prayer to be prayed daily; the United Methodist Church encourages its communicants to pray the canonical hours as "one of the essential practices" of being a disciple of Jesus. Some Methodist religious orders publish the Daily Office to be used for that community, for example, The Book of Offices and Services of The Order of Saint Luke contains the canonical hours to be prayed traditionally at seven fixed prayer times: Lauds (6 am), Terce (9 am), Sext (12 pm), None (3 pm), Vespers (6 pm), Compline (9 pm) and Vigil (12 am). Some Methodist congregations offer daily Morning Prayer.

In America, the Global Methodist Church, Evangelical Methodist Church, United Methodist Church and Free Methodist Church, as well as the Primitive Methodist Church and Wesleyan Methodist Church, have a wide variety of forms of worship, ranging from high church to low church in liturgical usage. When the Methodists in America were separated from the Church of England because of the American Revolution, John Wesley provided a revised version of the Book of Common Prayer called The Sunday Service of the Methodists; With Other Occasional Services (1784). Today, the primary liturgical books of the United Methodist Church are The United Methodist Hymnal and The United Methodist Book of Worship (1992). Congregations employ its liturgy and rituals as optional resources, but their use is not mandatory. These books contain the liturgies of the church that are generally derived from Wesley's Sunday Service and from the 20th-century liturgical renewal movement.

The British Methodist Church is less ordered, or less liturgical, in worship. It makes use of the Methodist Worship Book (similar to the Church of England's Common Worship), containing set services and rubrics for the celebration of other rites, such as marriage. The Worship Book is also ultimately derived from Wesley's Sunday Service.

A unique feature of American Methodism has been the observance of the season of Kingdomtide, encompassing the last 13 weeks before Advent, thus dividing the long season after Pentecost into two segments. During Kingdomtide, Methodist liturgy has traditionally emphasized charitable work and alleviating the suffering of the poor.

A second distinctive liturgical feature of Methodism is the use of Covenant Services. Although practice varies between national churches, most Methodist churches annually follow the call of John Wesley for a renewal of their covenant with God. It is common for each congregation to use the Covenant Renewal liturgy during the watchnight service in the night of New Year's Eve, though in Britain, these are often on the first Sunday of the year. Wesley's covenant prayer is still used, with minor modification, in the order of service:

Christ has many services to be done. Some are easy, others are difficult. Some bring honour, others bring reproach. Some are suitable to our natural inclinations and temporal interests, others are contrary to both ... Yet the power to do all these things is given to us in Christ, who strengthens us. ...I am no longer my own but yours. Put me to what you will, rank me with whom you will; put me to doing, put me to suffering; let me be employed for you or laid aside for you, exalted for you or brought low for you; let me be full, let me be empty, let me have all things, let me have nothing; I freely and wholeheartedly yield all things to your pleasure and disposal.

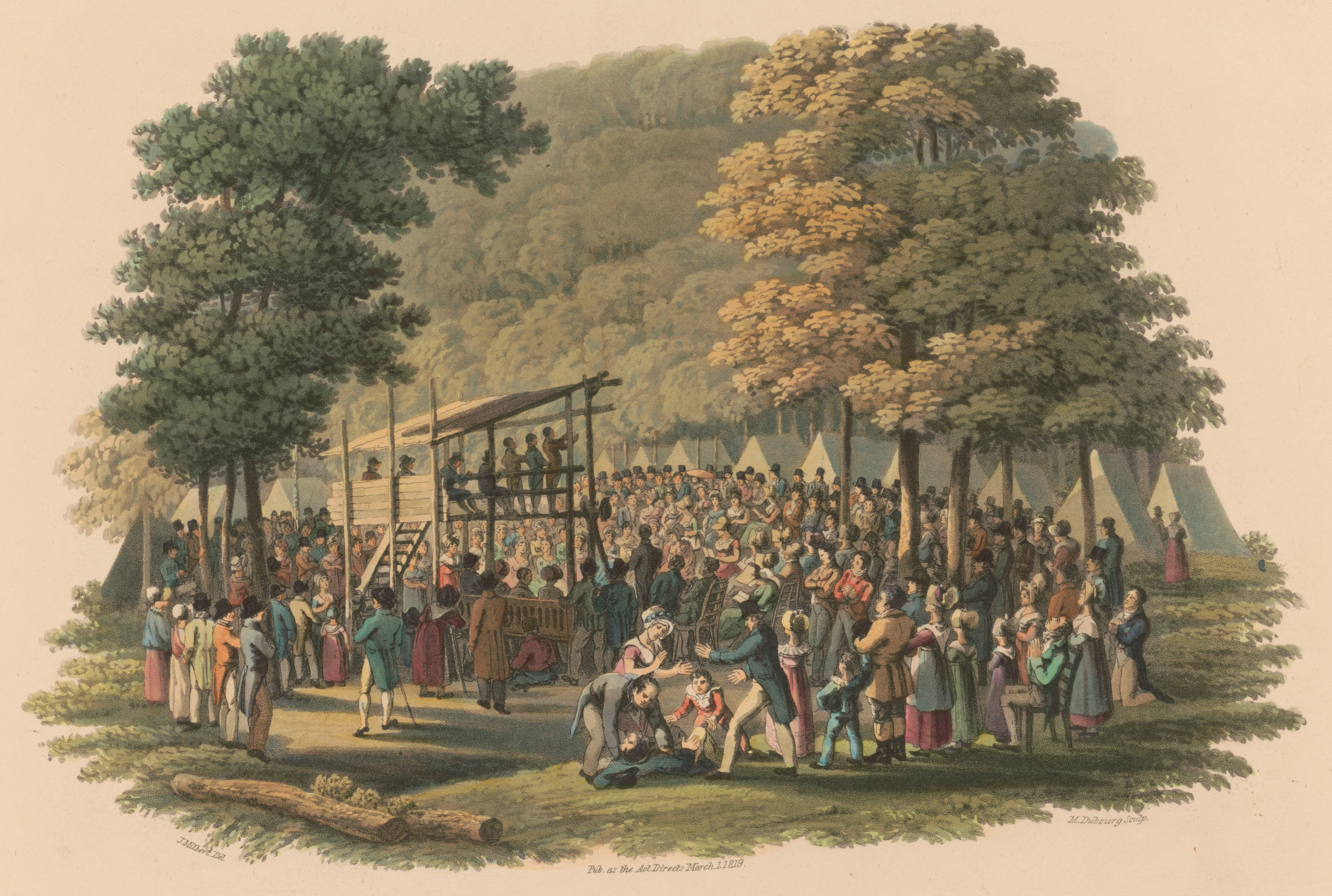
Methodist preachers were known for promulgating the doctrines of the new birth and entire sanctification to the public at events such as tent revivals, brush arbor revivals and camp meetings (depicted here in an engraving), which they believe is the reason that God brought them into existence.

As John Wesley advocated outdoor evangelism, revival services are a traditional worship practice of Methodism that are often held in churches, as well as at camp meetings, brush arbor revivals, and tent revivals.

== Membership ==
Traditionally, Methodist connexions descending from the tradition of the Methodist Episcopal Church have a probationary period of six months before an individual is admitted into church membership as a full member of a congregation. Given the wide attendance at Methodist revival meetings, many people started to attend Methodist services of worship regularly, though they had not yet committed to membership. When they made that commitment, becoming a probationer was the first step and during this period, probationers "receive additional instruction and provide evidence of the seriousness of their faith and willingness to abide by church discipline before being accepted into full membership." In addition to this, to be a probationary member of a Methodist congregation, a person traditionally requires an "earnest desire to be saved from [one's] sins". In the historic Methodist system, probationers were eligible to become members of class meetings, where they could be further discipled in their faith.

Catechisms such as The Probationer's Handbook, authored by minister Stephen O. Garrison, have been used by probationers to learn the Methodist faith. After six months, probationers were examined before the Leaders and Stewards' Meeting (which consisted of Class Leaders and Stewards) where they were to provide "satisfactory assurance both of the correctness of his faith and of his willingness to observe and keep the rules of the church." If probationers were able to do this, they were admitted as full members of the congregation by the pastor.

Full members of a Methodist congregation "were obligated to attend worship services on a regular basis" and "were to abide by certain moral precepts, especially as they related to substance use, gambling, divorce, and immoral pastimes." This practice continues in certain Methodist connexions, such as the Lumber River Conference of the Holiness Methodist Church, in which probationers must be examined by the pastor, class leader, and board for full membership, in addition to being baptized. The same structure is found in the African Methodist Episcopal Zion Church, which teaches:

In order that we may not admit improper persons into our church, great care be taken in receiving persons on probation, and let not one be so received or enrolled who does not give satisfactory evidence of his/her desire to flee the wrath to come and to be saved from his/her sins. Such a person satisfying us in these particulars may be received into our church on six months probation; but shall not be admitted to full membership until he/she shall have given satisfactory evidence of saving faith in the Lord Jesus Christ.

— ¶89, The Doctrine and Discipline of the African Methodist Episcopal Zion Church

The pastor and class leader are to ensure "that all persons on probation be instructed in the Rules and Doctrines of The African Methodist Episcopal Zion Church before they are admitted to Full Membership" and that "probationers are expected to conform to the rules and usages of the Church, and to show evidence of their desire for fellowship in the Church". After the six-month probation period, "A probationer may be admitted to full membership, provided he/she has served out his/her probation, has been baptized, recommended at the Leaders' Meeting, and, if none has been held according to law, recommended by the Leader, and, on examination by the Pastor before the Church as required in ¶600 has given satisfactory assurance both of the correctness of his/her faith, and of his/her willingness to observe and keep the rules of our Church." The Allegheny Wesleyan Methodist Connection admits to associate membership, by vote of the congregation, those who give affirmation to two questions: "1) Does the Lord now forgive your sins? 2) Will you acquaint yourself with the discipline of our connection and earnestly endeavor to govern your life by its rules as God shall give you understanding?" Probationers who wish to become full members are examined by the advisory board before being received as such through four vows (on the new birth, entire sanctification, outward holiness, and assent to the Articles of Religion) and a covenant. In the United Methodist Church, the process of becoming a professing member of a congregation is done through the taking membership vows (normatively in the rite of confirmation) after a period of instruction and receiving the sacrament of baptism. It is the practice of certain Methodist connexions that when people become members of a congregation, they are offered the Right Hand of Fellowship. Methodists traditionally celebrate the Covenant Renewal Service as the watchnight service annually on New Year's Eve, in which members renew their covenant with God and the Church.

== Lifestyle ==
Early Methodists wore plain dress, with Methodist clergy condemning "high headdresses, ruffles, laces, gold, and 'costly apparel' in general". John Wesley recommended that Methodists annually read his thoughts On Dress; in that sermon, Wesley expressed his desire for Methodists: "Let me see, before I die, a Methodist congregation, full as plain dressed as a Quaker congregation." The General Rules of the Methodist Church enjoined the faithful against "Doing what we know is not for the glory of God; as, The putting on of gold and costly apparel." The 1858 Discipline of the Wesleyan Methodist Connection thus stated that "we would ... enjoin on all who fear God plain dress." Peter Cartwright, a Methodist revivalist, stated that in addition to wearing plain dress, the early Methodists distinguished themselves from other members of society by fasting once a week, abstaining from alcohol (teetotalism), and devoutly observing the Sabbath. These concepts are enjoined in The General Rules of the Methodist Church. Methodist circuit riders were known for practicing the spiritual discipline of mortifying the flesh as they "arose well before dawn for solitary prayer; they remained on their knees without food or drink or physical comforts sometimes for hours on end." The early Methodists did not participate in, and condemned, "worldly habits" including "playing cards, racing horses, gambling, attending the theater, dancing (both in frolics and balls), and cockfighting."

In Methodism, fasting is considered one of the works of piety. The Directions Given to Band Societies (25 December 1744) by John Wesley mandate fasting and abstinence from meat on all Fridays of the year (in remembrance of the crucifixion of Jesus). Wesley himself also fasted before receiving Holy Communion "for the purpose of focusing his attention on God," and asked other Methodists to do the same.

Over time, many of these practices were relaxed in mainline Methodism, although practices such as teetotalism and fasting are still encouraged, in addition to the current prohibition of gambling. Denominations of the conservative holiness movement, such as the Allegheny Wesleyan Methodist Connection and Evangelical Methodist Church Conference, continue to reflect the spirit of the historic Methodist practice of wearing plain dress, with members abstaining from the "wearing of apparel which does not modestly and properly clothe the person" and "refraining from the wearing of jewelry" and "superfluous ornaments (including the wedding ring)". The Fellowship of Independent Methodist Churches, which continues to observe the ordinance of women's headcovering, stipulates "renouncing all vain pomp and glory" and "adorning oneself with modest attire." The General Rules of the Methodist Church in America, which are among the doctrinal standards of many Methodist Churches, promote first-day Sabbatarianism as they require "attending upon all the ordinances of God" including "the public worship of God" and prohibit "profaning the day of the Lord, either by doing ordinary work therein or by buying or selling."

== Contemporary Methodist denominations ==
Methodism is a worldwide movement and Methodist churches are present on all populated continents. Although Methodism is declining in Great Britain and North America, it is growing in other places – at a rapid pace in, for example, South Korea. There is no single Methodist Church with universal juridical authority; Methodists belong to multiple independent denominations or "connexions". The great majority of Methodists are members of denominations which are part of the World Methodist Council, an international association of 80 Methodist, Wesleyan, and related uniting denominations, representing about 80 million people.

I look on all the world as my parish; thus far I mean, that, in whatever part of it I am, I judge it meet, right, and my bounden duty, to declare unto all that are willing to hear, the glad tidings of salvation.

— John Wesley, Journal (11 June 1739)

=== Europe ===
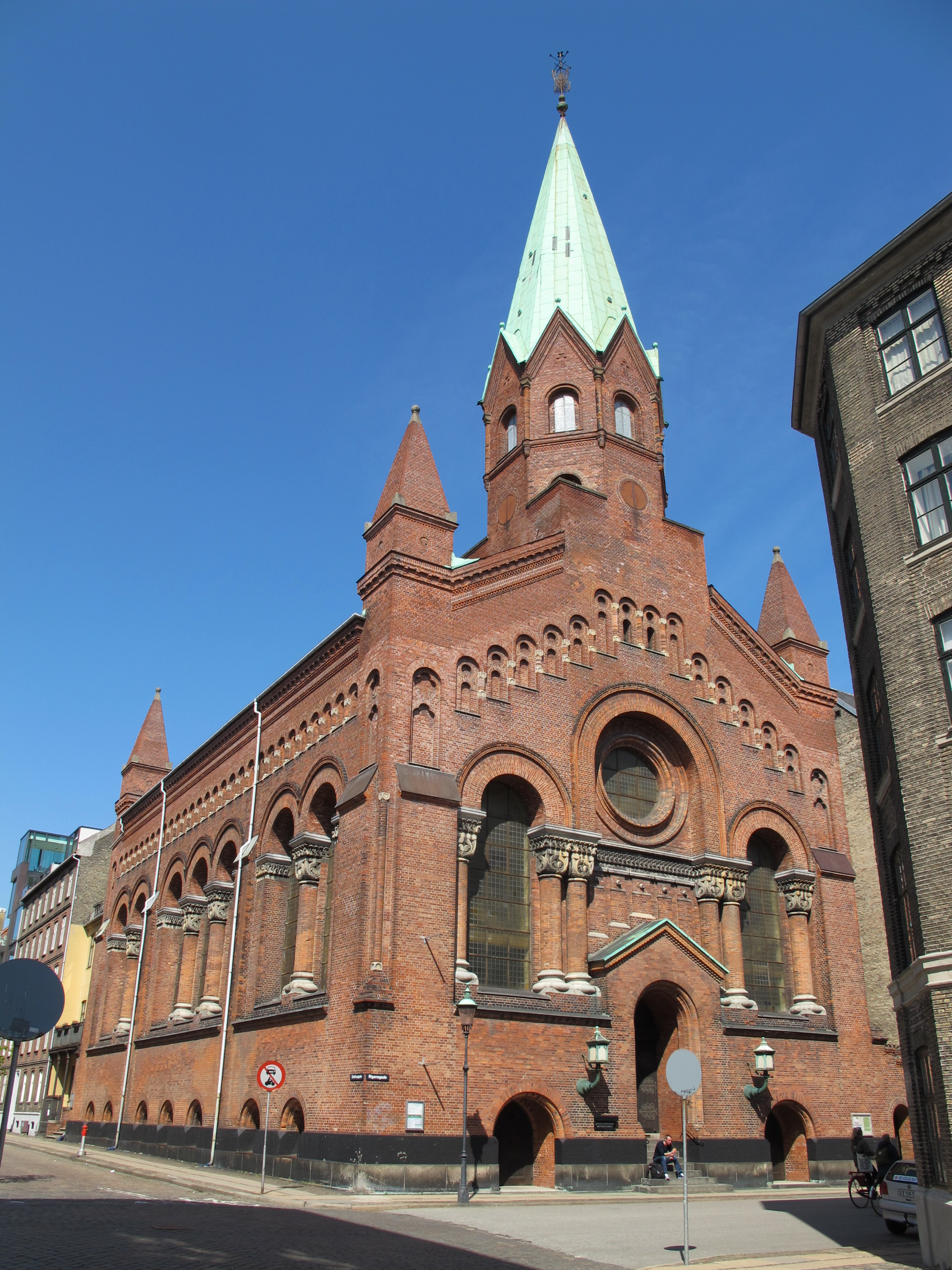
Jerusalem's Church, Copenhagen, the main Methodist church in Denmark

Methodism is prevalent in the English-speaking world but it is also organized in mainland Europe, largely due to missionary activity of British and American Methodists. British missionaries were primarily responsible for establishing Methodism across Ireland and Italy. Today the United Methodist Church (UMC) – a large denomination based in the United States – has a presence in Albania, Austria, Belarus, Belgium, Bulgaria, the Czech Republic, Croatia, Denmark, Estonia, Finland, France, Germany, Hungary, Latvia, Lithuania, Moldova, North Macedonia, Norway, Poland, Romania, Serbia, Slovakia, Sweden, Switzerland, and Ukraine. Collectively the European and Eurasian regions of the UMC constitute a little over 100,000 Methodists (as of 2017). Other smaller Methodist denominations exist in Europe.

==== Great Britain ====
The original body founded as a result of Wesley's work came to be known as the Wesleyan Methodist Church. Schisms within the original church, and independent revivals, led to the formation of a number of separate denominations calling themselves "Methodist". The largest of these were the Primitive Methodists, deriving from a revival at Mow Cop in Staffordshire, the Bible Christians, and the Methodist New Connexion. The original church adopted the name "Wesleyan Methodist" to distinguish it from these bodies. In 1907, a union of smaller groups with the Methodist New Connexion and Bible Christian Church brought about the United Methodist Church; then the three major streams of British Methodism united in 1932 to form the present Methodist Church of Great Britain. The fourth-largest denomination in the country, the Methodist Church of Great Britain has about 202,000 members in 4,650 congregations.

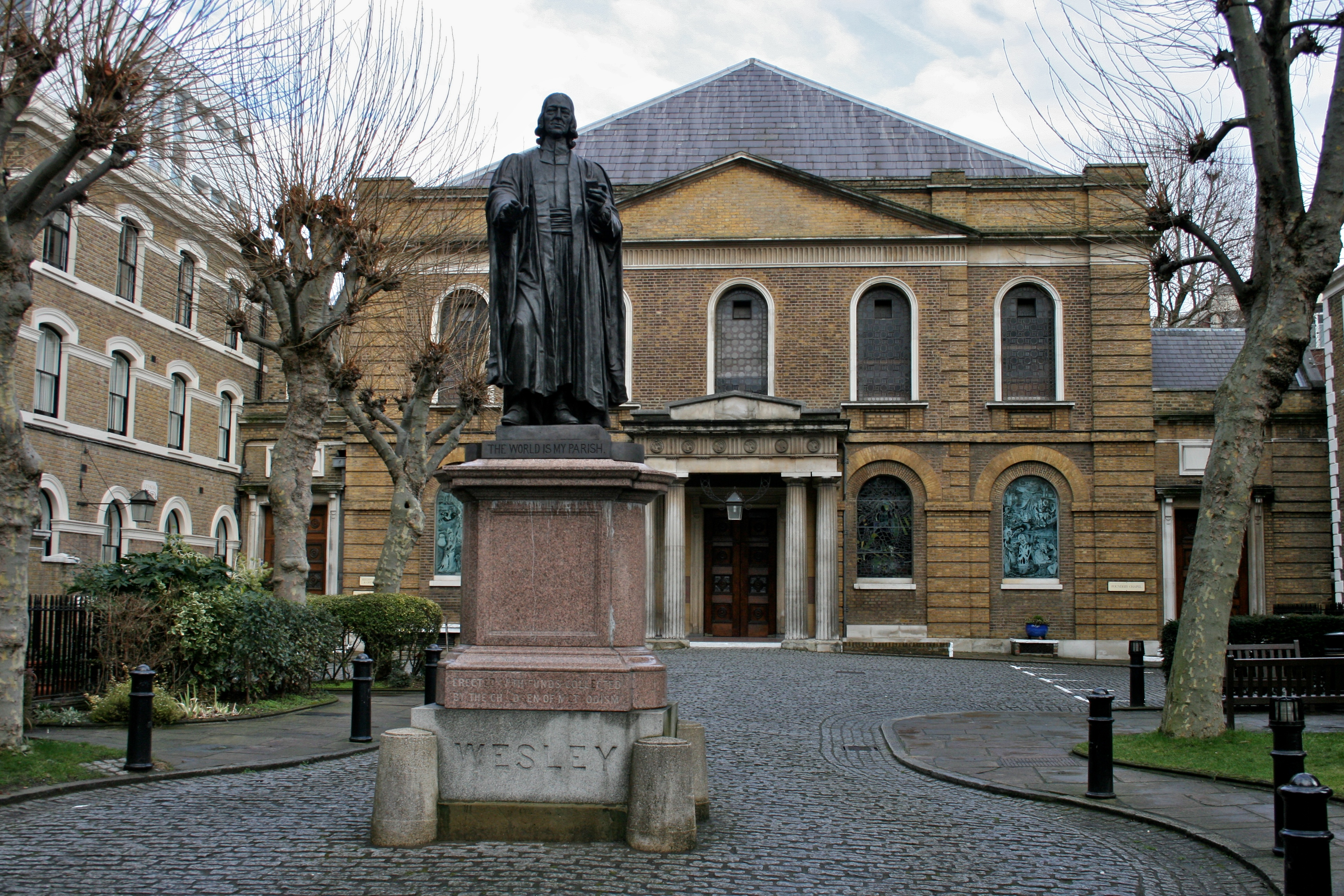
Wesley's Chapel in London was established by John Wesley, whose statue stands in the courtyard.

Early Methodism was particularly prominent in Devon and Cornwall, which were key centers of activity by the Bible Christian faction of Methodists. The Bible Christians produced many preachers, and sent many missionaries to Australia. Methodism also grew rapidly in the old mill towns of Yorkshire and Lancashire, where the preachers stressed that the working classes were equal to the upper classes in the eyes of God. In Wales, three elements separately welcomed Methodism: Welsh-speaking, English-speaking, and Calvinistic.

British Methodists, in particular the Primitive Methodists, took a leading role in the temperance movement of the 19th and early 20th centuries. Methodists saw alcoholic beverages, and alcoholism, as the root of many social ills and tried to persuade people to abstain from these. Temperance appealed strongly to the Methodist doctrines of sanctification and perfection. To this day, alcohol remains banned in Methodist premises, however this restriction no longer applies to domestic occasions in private homes (i.e. the minister may have a drink at home in the manse). The choice to consume alcohol is now a personal decision for any member.

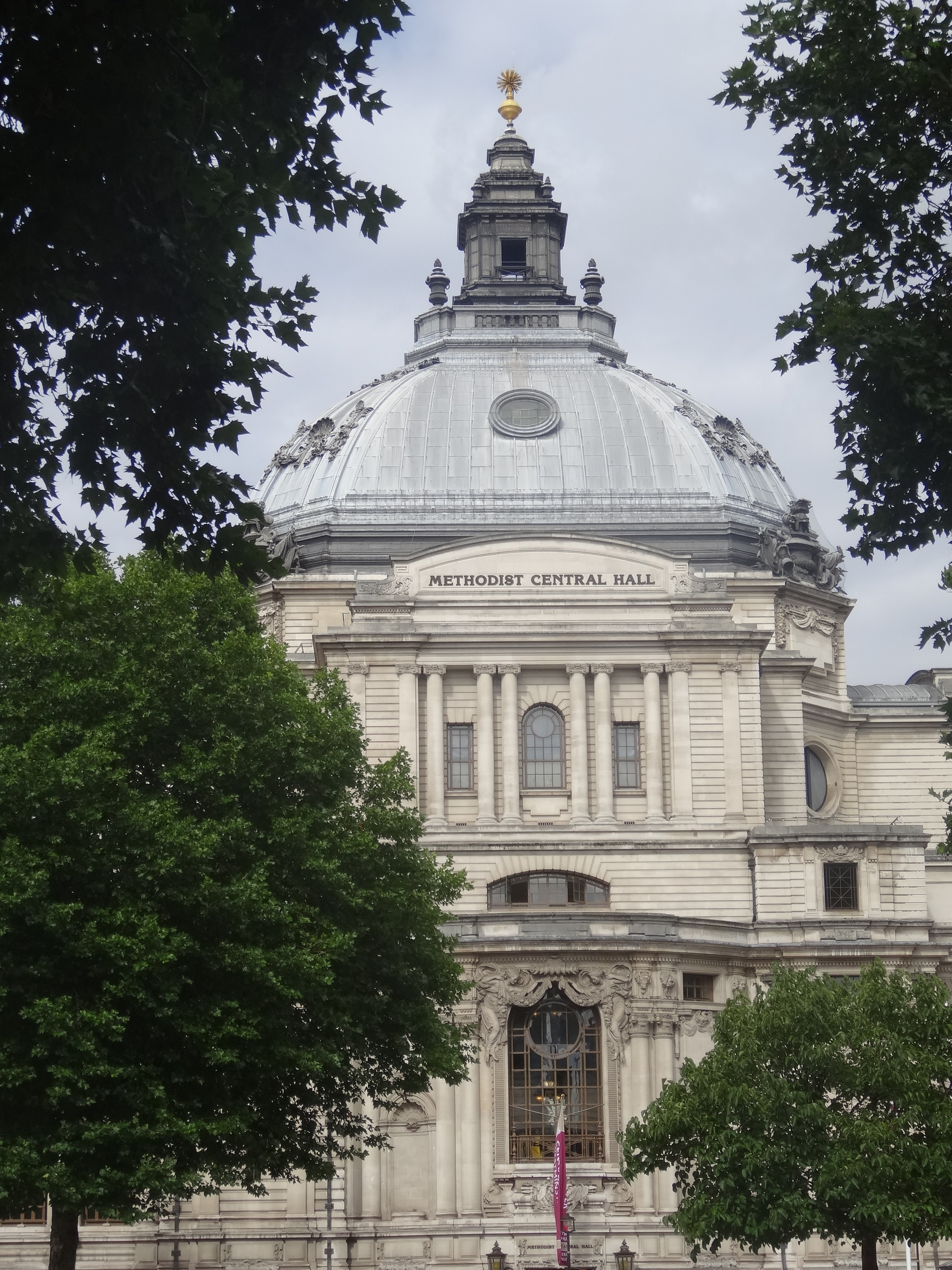
The Central Hall in Westminster, London

British Methodism does not have bishops; however, it has always been characterised by a strong central organisation, the Connexion, which holds an annual Conference (the church retains the 18th-century spelling connexion for many purposes). The Connexion is divided into Districts in the charge of the chairperson (who may be male or female). Methodist districts often correspond approximately, in geographical terms, to counties – as do Church of England dioceses. The districts are divided into circuits governed by the Circuit Meeting and led and administrated principally by a superintendent minister. Ministers are appointed to Circuits rather than to individual churches, although some large inner-city churches, known as "central halls", are designated as circuits in themselves – of these Westminster Central Hall, opposite Westminster Abbey in central London, is the best known. Most circuits have fewer ministers than churches, and the majority of services are led by lay local preachers, or by supernumerary ministers (ministers who have retired, called supernumerary because they are not counted for official purposes in the numbers of ministers for the circuit in which they are listed). The superintendent and other ministers are assisted in the leadership and administration of the Circuit by circuit stewards - laypeople with particular skills who, who with the ministers, collectively form what is normally known as the Circuit Leadership Team.

The Methodist Council also helps to run a number of schools, including two public schools in East Anglia: Culford School and the Leys School. The council promotes an all round education with a strong Christian ethos.

Other Methodist denominations in Britain include: the Free Methodist Church, the Fellowship of Independent Methodist Churches, the Church of the Nazarene, and The Salvation Army, all of which are Methodist churches aligned with the holiness movement, as well as the Wesleyan Reform Union, an early secession from the Wesleyan Methodist Church, and the Independent Methodist Connexion.

==== Ireland ====
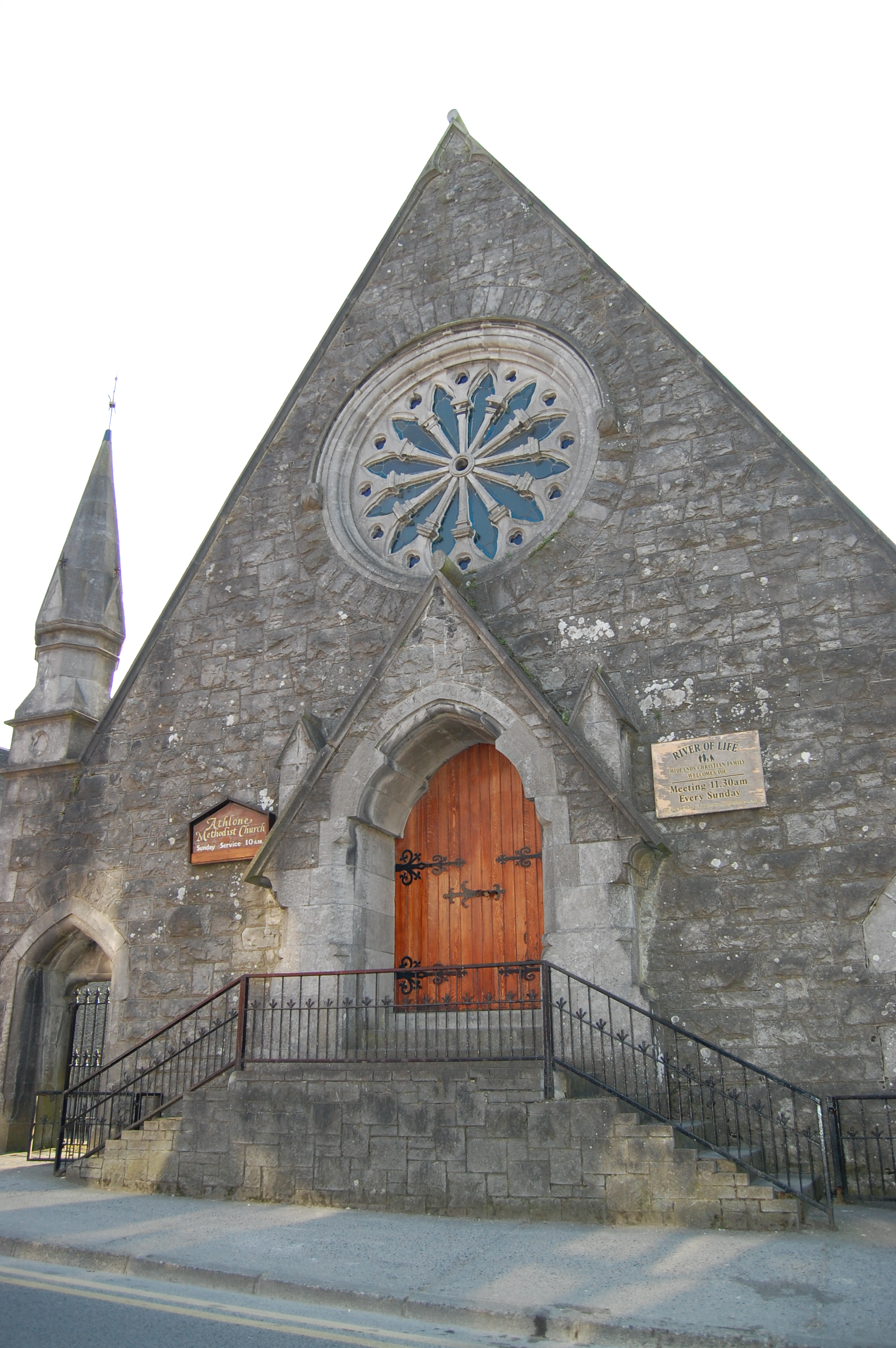
A Methodist chapel in Athlone, opened in 1865

John Wesley visited Ireland on at least twenty-four occasions and established classes and societies. The Methodist Church in Ireland (Irish: Eaglais Mheitidisteach in Éirinn) today operates across both Northern Ireland and the Republic of Ireland on an all-Ireland basis. As of 2018, there were around 50,000 Methodists across Ireland. In 2013, the biggest concentration – 13,171 – was in Belfast, with 2,614 in Dublin. As of 2021, it is the fourth-largest denomination in Northern Ireland, with Methodists accounting for 2.3% of the population, compared to 3% in 2011.

Eric Gallagher was the President of the Church in the 1967 becoming a well-known figure in Irish politics. He was one of the group of Protestant churchmen who met with Provisional IRA officers in Feakle, County Clare to try to broker peace. The meeting was unsuccessful due to a Garda raid on the hotel.

In 1973, the Fellowship of Independent Methodist Churches (FIMC) was established as a number of theologically conservative congregations departed both the Methodist Church in Ireland and Free Methodist Church due to what they perceived as the rise of Modernism in those denominations.

==== Italy ====
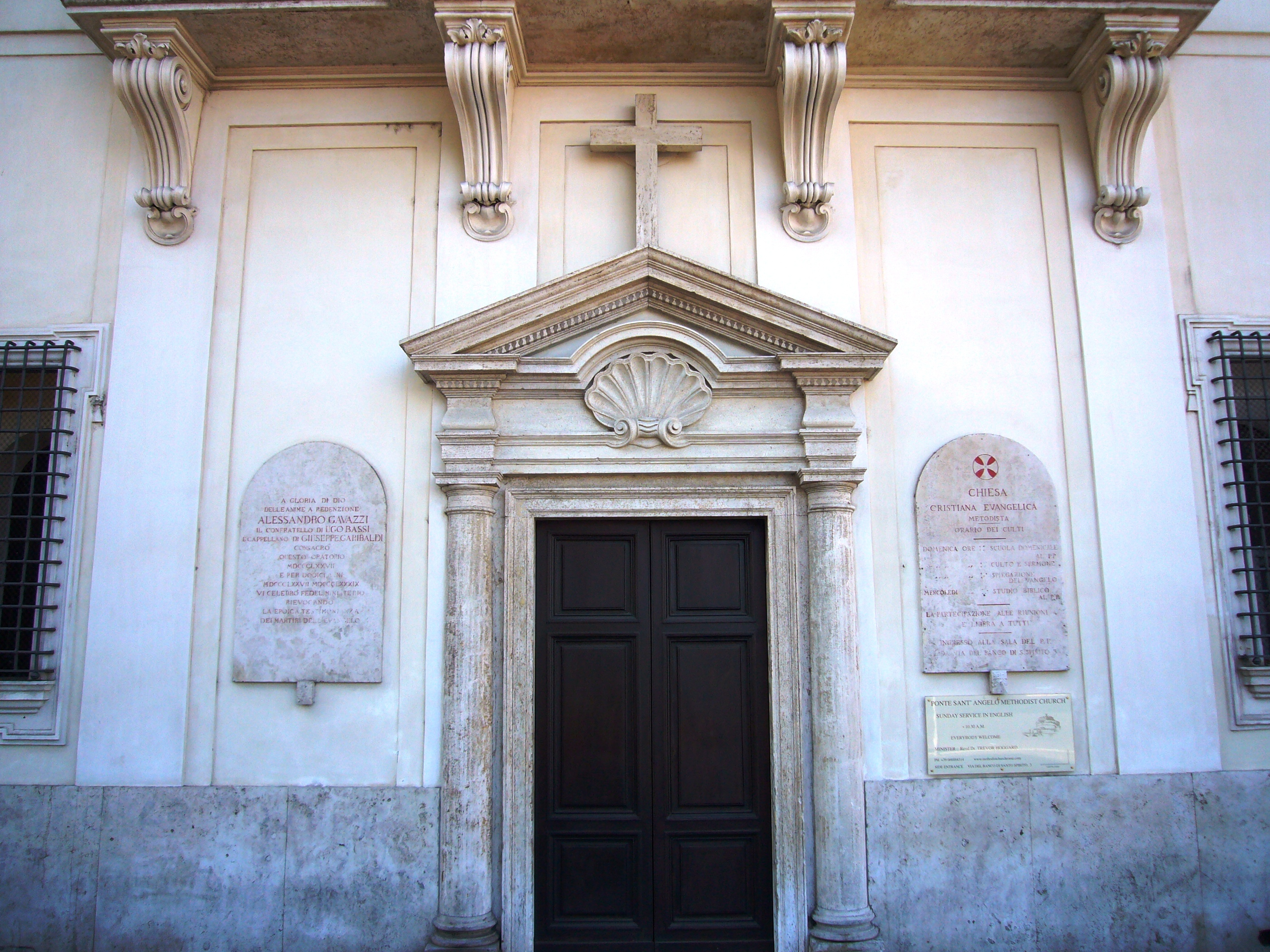
A Methodist chapel in Rome houses Italian and English-speaking congregations

The Italian Methodist Church (Italian: Chiesa Metodista Italiana) is a small Protestant community in Italy, with around 7,000 members. Since 1975, it is in a formal covenant of partnership with the Waldensian Church, with a total of 45,000 members. Waldensians are a Protestant movement which started in Lyon, France, in the late 1170s.

Italian Methodism has its origins in the Italian Free Church, British Wesleyan Methodist Missionary Society, and the American Methodist Episcopal Mission. These movements flowered in the second half of the 19th century in the new climate of political and religious freedom that was established with the end of the Papal States and unification of Italy in 1870.

Bertrand M. Tipple, minister of the American Methodist Church in Rome, founded a college there in 1914.

In April 2016, the World Methodist Council opened an Ecumenical Office in Rome. Methodist leaders and the leader of the Roman Catholic Church, Pope Francis, jointly dedicated the new office. It helps facilitate Methodist relationships with the wider Church, especially the Roman Catholic Church.

==== Nordic and Baltic countries ====
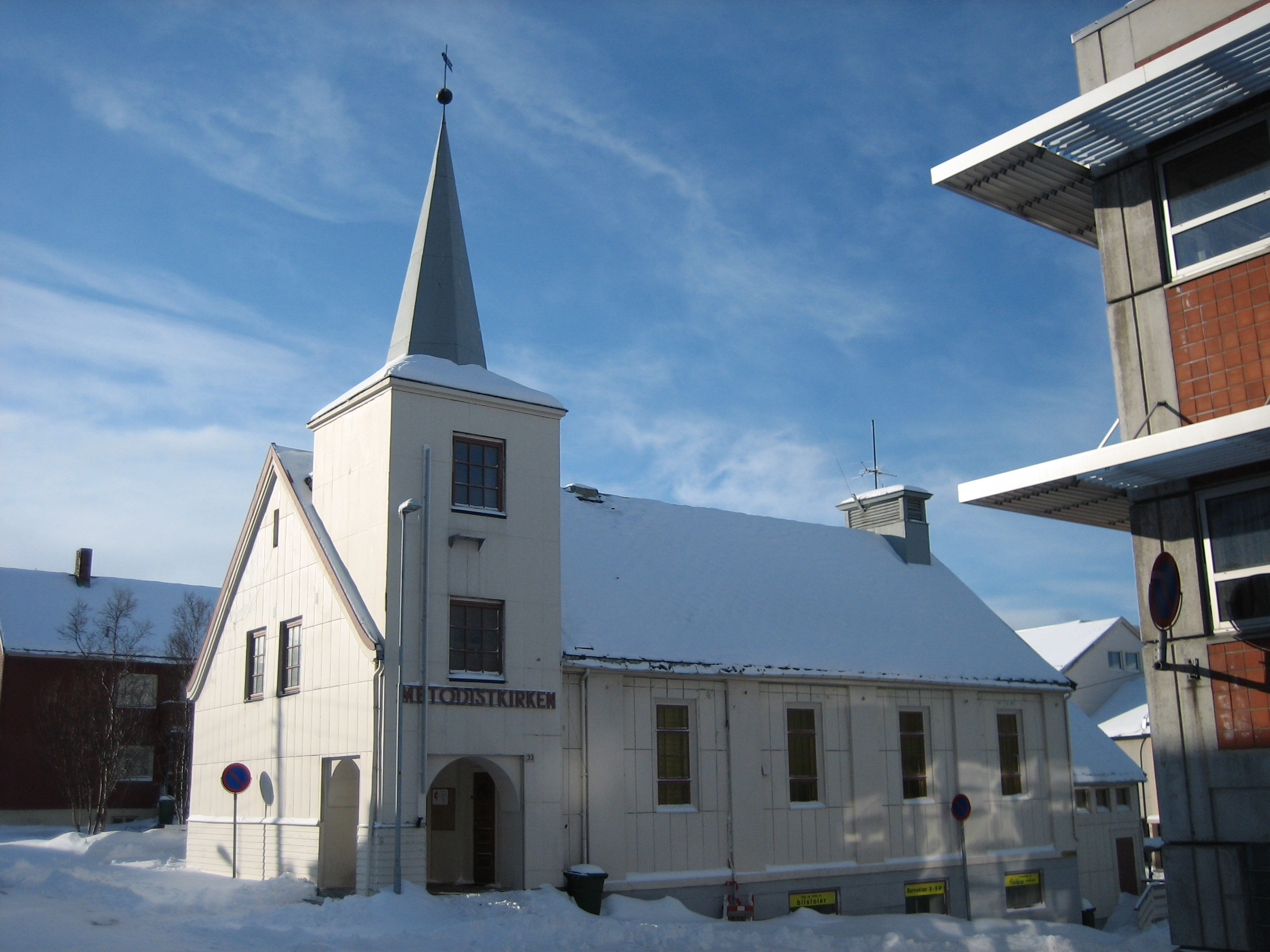
Hammerfest Methodist Church in Norway was the world's most northerly Methodist congregation when established in 1890.

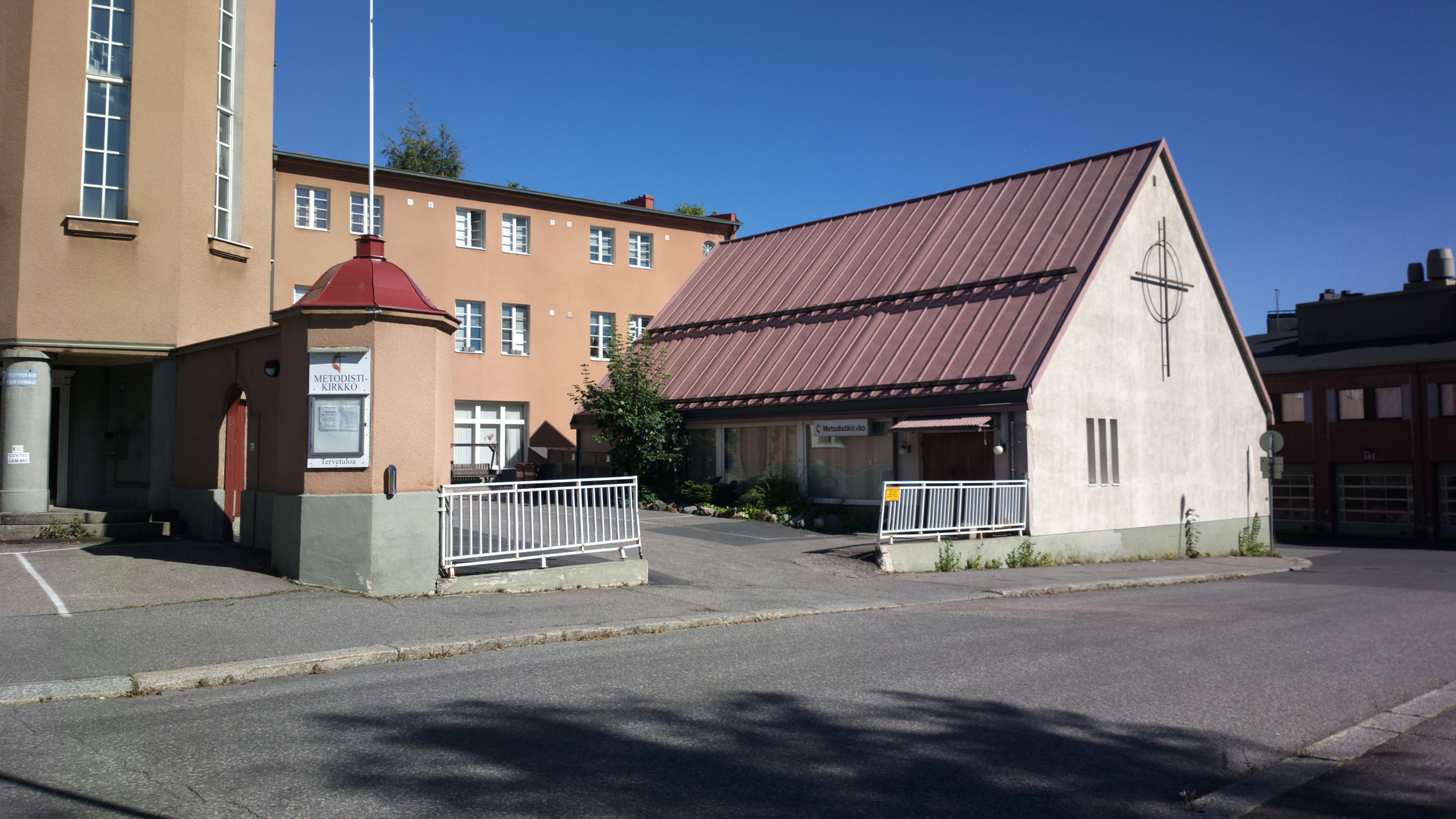
Methodist church in Tampere, Finland

The "Nordic and Baltic Area" of the United Methodist Church covers the Nordic countries (Denmark, Sweden, Norway, and Finland) and the Baltic countries (Estonia, Latvia, and Lithuania). Methodism was introduced to the Nordic countries in the late 19th century. Today the United Methodist Church in Norway (Norwegian: Metodistkirken) is the largest annual meeting in the region with 10,684 members in total (as of 2013). The United Methodist Church in Sweden (Swedish: Metodistkyrkan) joined the Uniting Church in Sweden in 2011.

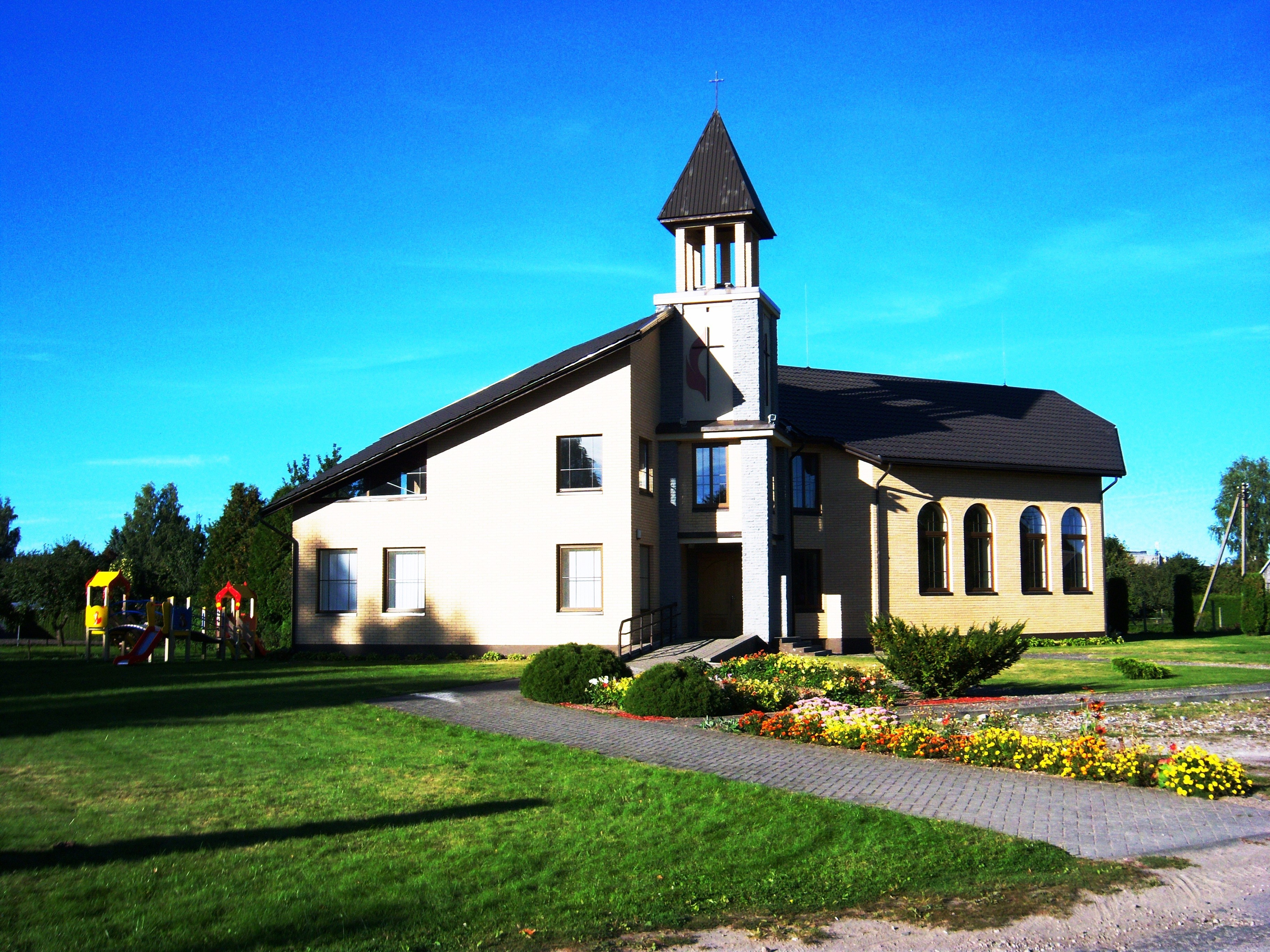
Methodist church in Pilviškiai, Lithuania

Methodism arrived in Finland through Ostrobothnians sailors in the 1860s, and Methodism spread especially in Swedish-speaking Ostrobothnia. The first Methodist congregation was founded in Vaasa in 1881 and the first Finnish-speaking congregation in Pori in 1887. At the turn of the century, the congregation in Vaasa became the largest and most active congregation in Methodism.

==== France ====
The French Methodist movement was founded in the 1820s by Charles Cook in the village of Congénies in Languedoc near Nîmes and Montpellier. The most important chapel of department was built in 1869, where there had been a Quaker community since the 18th century. Sixteen Methodist congregations voted to join the Reformed Church of France in 1938. In the 1980s, missionary work of a Methodist church in Agen led to new initiatives in Fleurance and Mont de Marsan.

Methodism exists today in France under various names. The best-known is the Union of Evangelical Methodist Churches (French: l'Union de l'Eglise Evangélique Méthodiste) or UEEM. It is an autonomous regional conference of the United Methodist Church and is the fruit of a fusion in 2005 between the "Methodist Church of France" and the "Union of Methodist Churches". As of 2014, the UEEM has around 1,200 members and 30 ministers.

==== Germany ====
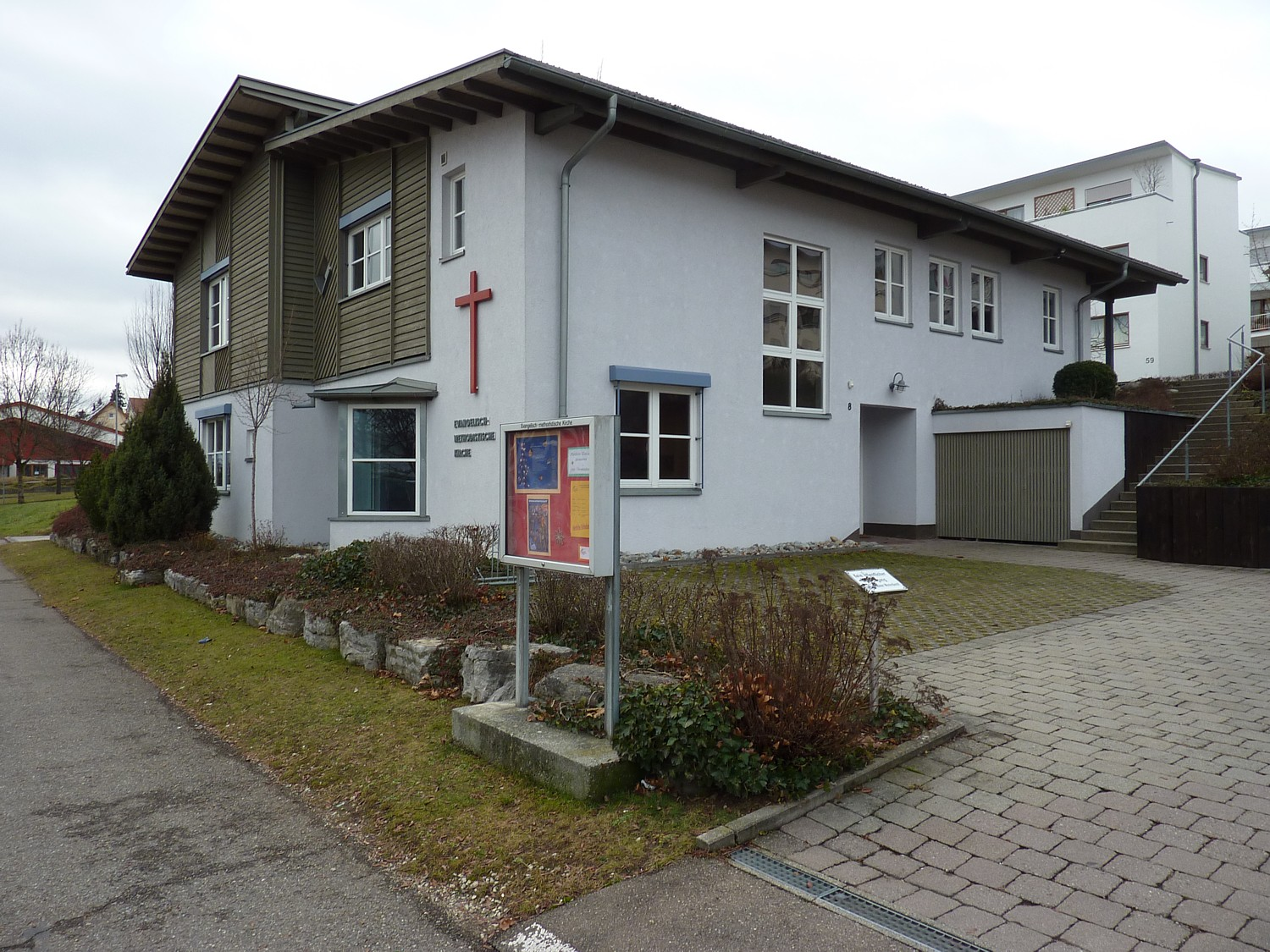
Methodist chapel at the foot of the Achalm mountain, Baden-Württemberg

In Germany, Switzerland and Austria, Evangelisch-methodistische Kirche is the name of the United Methodist Church. The German part of the church had about 52,031 members in 2015. Members are organized into three annual conferences: north, east and south. All three annual conferences belong to the Germany Central Conference. Methodism is most prevalent in southern Saxony and around Stuttgart.

A Methodist missionary returning from Britain introduced (British) Methodism to Germany in 1830, initially in the region of Württemberg. Methodism was also spread in Germany through the missionary work of the Methodist Episcopal Church which began in 1849 in Bremen, soon spreading to Saxony and other parts of Germany. Other Methodist missionaries of the Evangelical Association went near Stuttgart (Württemberg) in 1850. Further Methodist missionaries of the Church of the United Brethren in Christ worked in Franconia and other parts of Germany from 1869 until 1905. Therefore, Methodism has four roots in Germany.

Early opposition towards Methodism was partly rooted in theological differences – northern and eastern regions of Germany were predominantly Lutheran and Reformed, and Methodists were dismissed as fanatics. Methodism was also hindered by its unfamiliar church structure (Connectionalism), which was more centralised than the hierarchical polity in the Lutheran and Reformed churches. After World War I, the 1919 Weimar Constitution allowed Methodists to worship freely and many new chapels were established. In 1936, German Methodists elected their first bishop.

==== Hungary ====
The first Methodist mission in Hungary was established in November 1898 in Bácska by Robert Möller, a Methodist pastor from Vienna. In 1905 a Methodist mission was established also in Budapest. In 1974, a group later known as the Hungarian Evangelical Fellowship seceded from the Hungarian Methodist Church over the question of interference by the communist state.

As of 2017, the United Methodist Church in Hungary, known locally as the Hungarian Methodist Church (Hungarian: Magyarországi Metodista Egyház), had 453 professing members in 30 congregations. It runs two student homes, two homes for the elderly, the Forray Methodist High School, the Wesley Scouts and the Methodist Library and Archives. The church has a special ministry among the Roma.

The seceding Hungarian Evangelical Fellowship (Magyarországi Evangéliumi Testvérközösség) also remains Methodist in its organisation and theology. It has eight full congregations and several mission groups, and runs a range of charitable organisations: hostels and soup kitchens for the homeless, a non-denominational theological college, a dozen schools of various kinds, and four old people's homes.

Today there are a dozen Methodist/Wesleyan churches and mission organisations in Hungary, but all Methodist churches lost official church status under new legislation passed in 2011, when the number of officially recognized churches in the country fell to 14. However, the list of recognized churches was lengthened to 32 at the end of February 2012. This gave recognition to the Hungarian Methodist Church and the Salvation Army, which was banned in Hungary in 1949 but had returned in 1990, but not to the Hungarian Evangelical Fellowship. The legislation has been strongly criticised by the Venice Commission of the Council of Europe as discriminatory.

The Hungarian Methodist Church, the Salvation Army and the Church of the Nazarene and other Wesleyan groups formed the Wesley Theological Alliance for theological and publishing purposes in 1998. Today the Alliance has 10 Wesleyan member churches and organisations. The Hungarian Evangelical Fellowship does not belong to it and has its own publishing arm.

==== Russia ====
The Methodist Church established several strongholds in Russia – Saint Petersburg in the west and the Vladivostok region in the east, with large Methodist centres in Moscow and Ekaterinburg (former Sverdlovsk). Methodists began their work in the west among Swedish immigrants in 1881 and started their work in the east in 1910. On 26 June 2009, Methodists celebrated the 120th year since Methodism arrived in Czarist Russia by erecting a new Methodist centre in Saint Petersburg. A Methodist presence was continued in Russia for 14 years after the Russian Revolution of 1917 through the efforts of Deaconess Anna Eklund. In 1939, political antagonism stymied the work of the Church and Deaconess Anna Eklund was coerced to return to her native Finland.

After 1989, the Soviet Union allowed greatly increased religious freedoms and this continued after the USSR's collapse in 1991. During the 1990s, Methodism experienced a powerful wave of revival in the nation. Three sites in particular carried the torch – Samara, Moscow and Ekaterinburg. As of 2011, the United Methodist Church in Eurasia comprised 116 congregations, each with a native pastor. There are currently 48 students enrolled in residential and extension degree programs at the United Methodist Seminary in Moscow.

=== Caribbean ===
Methodism came to the Caribbean in 1760 when the planter, lawyer and Speaker of the Antiguan House of Assembly, Nathaniel Gilbert (c. 1719–1774), returned to his sugar estate home in Antigua. A Methodist revival spread in the British West Indies due to the work of British missionaries. Missionaries established societies which would later become the Methodist Church in the Caribbean and the Americas (MCCA). The MCCA has about 62,000 members in over 700 congregations, ministered by 168 pastors. They have a strong and active partnership with United Methodist Church (USA) and United Church of Canada. There are smaller Methodist denominations such as Methodist Church of The Bahamas, that have seceded from the parent church.

==== Antigua ====
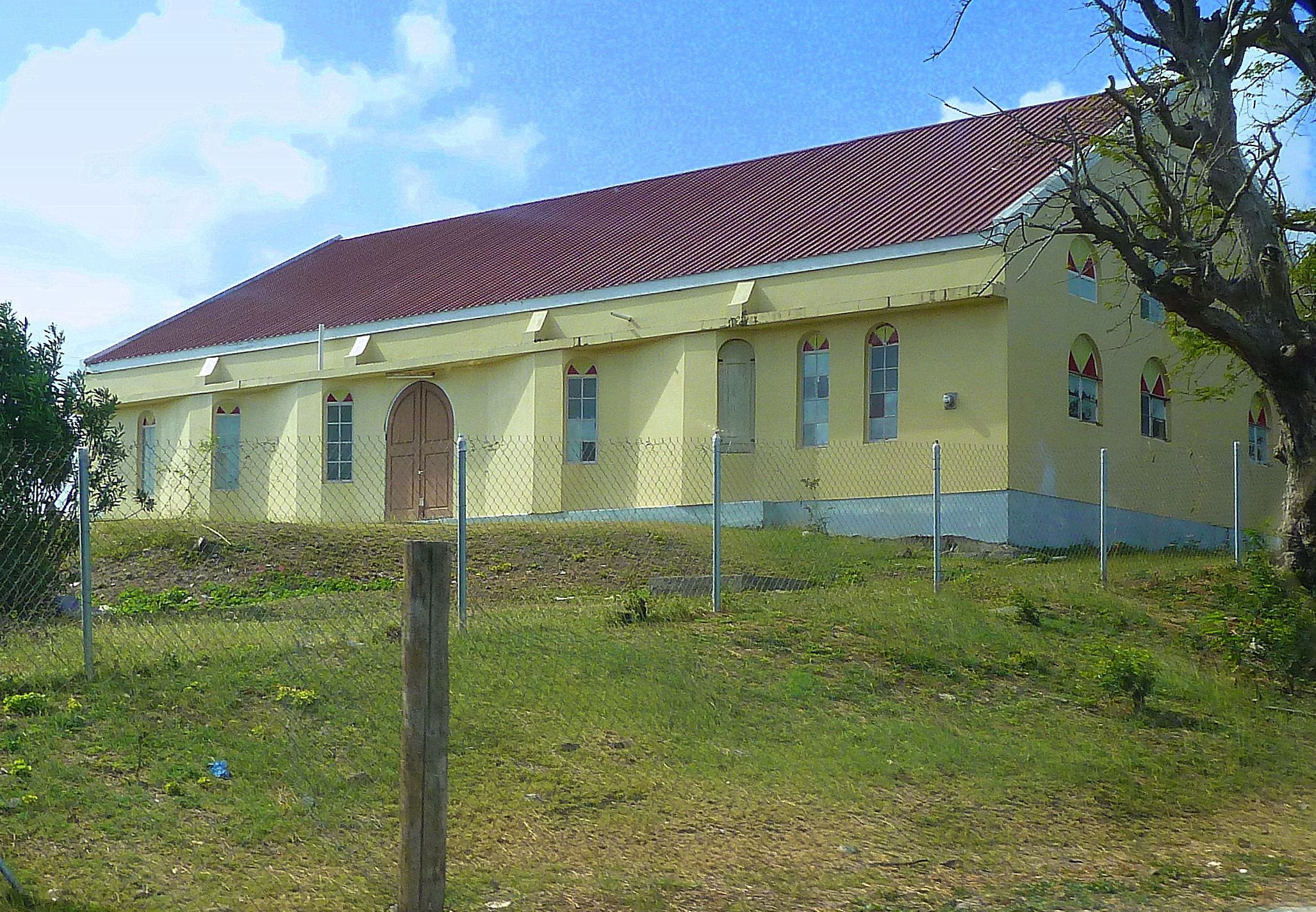
Baxter Memorial Church in English Harbour

The story is often told that in 1755, Nathaniel Gilbert, while convalescing, read a treatise of John Wesley, An Appeal to Men of Reason and Religion sent to him by his brother Francis. As a result of having read this book Gilbert, two years later, journeyed to England with three of his slaves and there in a drawing room meeting arranged in Wandsworth on 15 January 1759, met the preacher John Wesley. He returned to the Caribbean that same year and on his subsequent return began to preach to his slaves in Antigua.

When Gilbert died in 1774 his work in Antigua was continued by his brother Francis Gilbert to approximately 200 Methodists. However, within a year Francis took ill and returned to Britain and the work was carried on by Sophia Campbell ("a Negress") and Mary Alley ("a Mulatto"), two devoted women who kept the flock together with class and prayer meetings as well as they could.

On 2 April 1778, John Baxter, a local preacher and skilled shipwright from Chatham in Kent, England, landed at English Harbour in Antigua (now called Nelson's Dockyard) where he was offered a post at the naval dockyard. Baxter was a Methodist and had heard of the work of the Gilberts and their need for a new preacher. He began preaching and meeting with the Methodist leaders, and within a year the Methodist community had grown to 600 persons. By 1783, the first Methodist chapel was built in Antigua, with John Baxter as the local preacher, its wooden structure seating some 2,000 people.

==== St. Barts ====
In 1785, William Turton (1761–1817) a Barbadian son of a planter, met John Baxter in Antigua, and later, as layman, assisted in the Methodist work in the Swedish colony of St. Bartholomew from 1796.

In 1786, the missionary endeavour in the Caribbean was officially recognized by the Methodist Conference in England, and that same year Thomas Coke, having been made Superintendent of the church two years previously in America by Wesley, was travelling to Nova Scotia, but weather forced his ship to Antigua.

==== Jamaica ====
In 1818 Edward Fraser (1798 – aft. 1850), a privileged Barbadian slave, moved to Bermuda and subsequently met the new minister James Dunbar. The Nova Scotia Methodist Minister noted young Fraser's sincerity and commitment to his congregation and encouraged him by appointing him as assistant. By 1827 Fraser assisted in building a new chapel. He was later freed and admitted to the Methodist Ministry to serve in Antigua and Jamaica.

==== Barbados ====
Following William J. Shrewsbury's preaching in the 1820s, Sarah Ann Gill (1779–1866), a free-born black woman, used civil disobedience in an attempt to thwart magistrate rulings that prevented parishioners holding prayer meetings. In hopes of building a new chapel, she paid an extraordinary £1,700-0s–0d and ended up having militia appointed by the Governor to protect her home from demolition.

In 1884 an attempt was made at autonomy with the formation of two West Indian Conferences, however by 1903 the venture had failed. It was not until the 1960s that another attempt was made at autonomy. This second attempt resulted in the emergence of the Methodist Church in the Caribbean and the Americas in May 1967.

Francis Godson (1864–1953), a Methodist minister, who having served briefly in several of the Caribbean islands, eventually immersed himself in helping those in hardship of the First World War in Barbados. He was later appointed to the Legislative Council of Barbados, and fought for the rights of pensioners. He was later followed by renowned Barbadian Augustus Rawle Parkinson (1864–1932), who also was the first principal of the Wesley Hall School, Bridgetown in Barbados (which celebrated its 125th anniversary in September 2009).

In more recent times in Barbados, Victor Alphonso Cooke (born 1930) and Lawrence Vernon Harcourt Lewis (born 1932) are strong influences on the Methodist Church on the island. Their contemporary and late member of the Dalkeith Methodist Church, was the former secretary of the University of the West Indies, consultant of the Canadian Training Aid Programme and a man of letters – Francis Woodbine Blackman (1922–2010). It was his research and published works that enlightened much of this information on Caribbean Methodism.

=== Africa ===
Most Methodist denominations in Africa follow the British Methodist tradition and see the Methodist Church of Great Britain as their mother church. Originally modelled on the British structure, since independence most of these churches have adopted an episcopal model of church governance.

==== Nigeria ====
The Nigerian Methodist Church is one of the largest Methodist denominations in the world and one of the largest Christian churches in Nigeria, with around two million members in 2000 congregations. It has seen exponential growth since the turn of the millennium.

Christianity was established in Nigeria with the arrival in 1842 of a Wesleyan Methodist missionary. He had come in response to the request for missionaries by the ex-slaves who returned to Nigeria from Sierra Leone. From the mission stations established in Badagry and Abeokuta, the Methodist church spread to various parts of the country west of the River Niger and part of the north. In 1893 missionaries of the Primitive Methodist Church arrived from Fernando Po, an island off the southern coast of Nigeria. From there the Methodist Church spread to other parts of the country, east of the River Niger and also to parts of the north. The church west of the River Niger and part of the north was known as the Western Nigeria District and east of the Niger and another part of the north as the Eastern Nigeria District. Both existed independently of each other until 1962 when they constituted the Conference of Methodist Church Nigeria. The conference is composed of seven districts. The church has continued to spread into new areas and has established a department for evangelism and appointed a director of evangelism. An episcopal system of church governance adopted in 1976 was not fully accepted by all sections of the church until the two sides came together and resolved to end the disagreement. A new constitution was ratified in 1990. The system is still episcopal but the points which caused discontent were amended to be acceptable to both sides. Today, the Nigerian Methodist Church has a prelate, eight archbishops and 44 bishops.

==== Ghana ====
Methodist bishops at a church conference in Winneba, 2008

Methodist Church Ghana is one of the largest Methodist denominations, with around 800,000 members in 2,905 congregations, ministered by 700 pastors. It has fraternal links with the British Methodist and United Methodist churches worldwide.

Methodism in Ghana came into existence as a result of the missionary activities of the Wesleyan Methodist Church, inaugurated with the arrival of Joseph Rhodes Dunwell to the Gold Coast in 1835. Like the mother church, the Methodist Church in Ghana was established by people of Protestant background. Roman Catholic and Anglican missionaries came to the Gold Coast from the 15th century. A school was established in Cape Coast by the Anglicans during the time of Philip Quaque, a Ghanaian priest. Those who came out of this school had Bible copies and study supplied by the Society for the Propagation of Christian Knowledge. A member of the resulting Bible study groups, William De-Graft, requested Bibles through Captain Potter of the ship Congo. Not only were Bibles sent, but also a Methodist missionary. In the first eight years of the Church's life, 11 out of 21 missionaries who worked in the Gold Coast died. Thomas Birch Freeman, who arrived at the Gold Coast in 1838 was a pioneer of missionary expansion. Between 1838 and 1857 he carried Methodism from the coastal areas to Kumasi in the Asante hinterland of the Gold Coast. He also established Methodist Societies in Badagry and AbeoKuta in Nigeria with the assistance of William De-Graft.

By 1854, the church was organized into circuits constituting a district with T. B. Freeman as chairman. Freeman was replaced in 1856 by William West. The district was divided and extended to include areas in the then Gold Coast and Nigeria by the synod in 1878, a move confirmed at the British Conference. The districts were Gold Coast District, with T. R. Picot as chairman and Yoruba and Popo District, with John Milum as chairman. Methodist evangelisation of northern Gold Coast began in 1910. After a long period of conflict with the colonial government, missionary work was established in 1955. Paul Adu was the first indigenous missionary to northern Gold Coast.

In July 1961, the Methodist Church in Ghana became autonomous, and was called the Methodist Church Ghana, based on a deed of foundation, part of the church's Constitution and Standing Orders.

==== Southern Africa ====
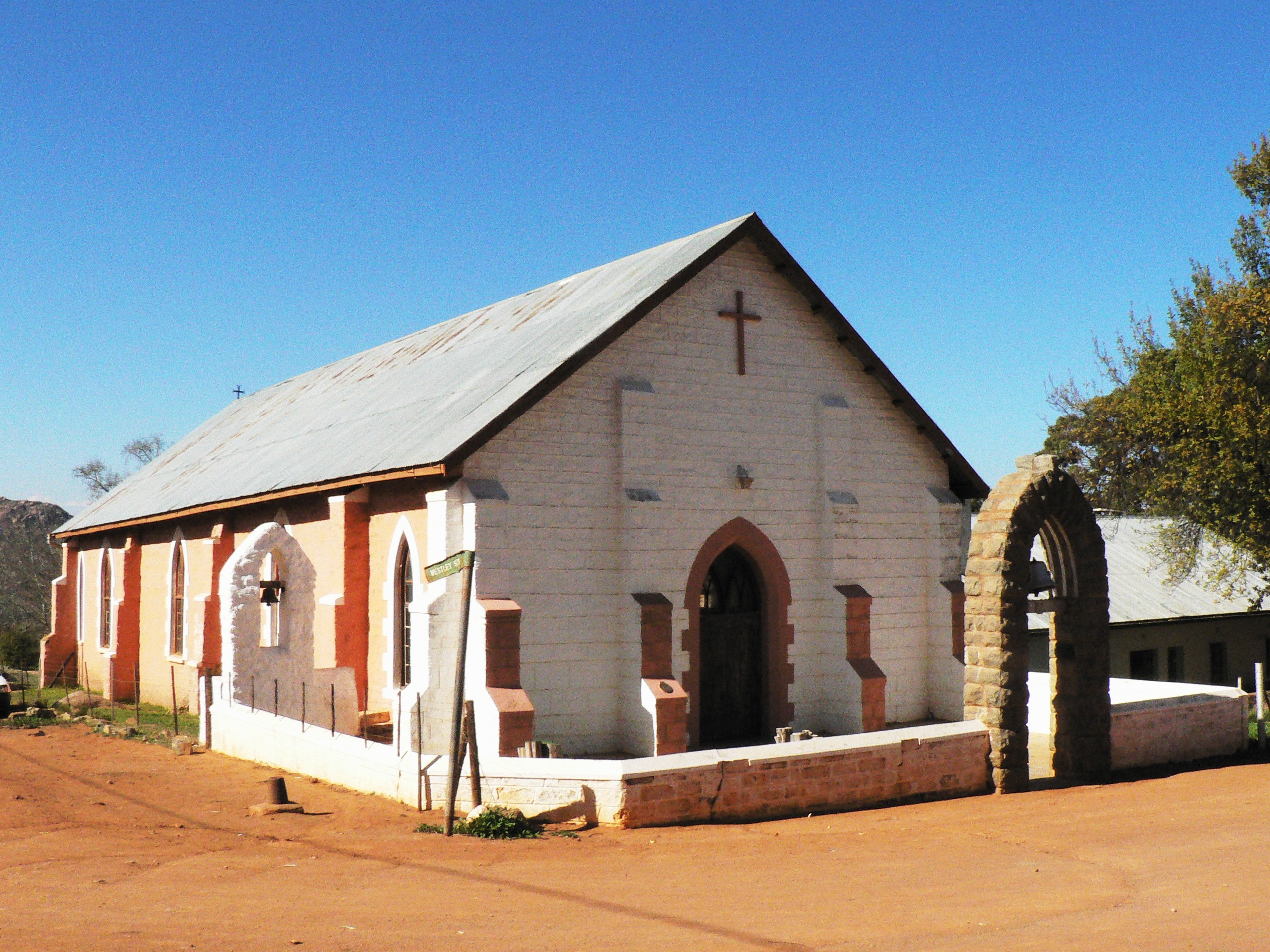
A Methodist chapel in Leliefontein, Northern Cape, South Africa

The Methodist Church operates across South Africa, Namibia, Botswana, Lesotho and Swaziland, with a limited presence in Zimbabwe and Mozambique. It is a member church of the World Methodist Council. Methodism in Southern Africa began as a result of lay Christian work by John Irwin, an Irish soldier in the British Army who was stationed at the Cape Colony between 1795 and 1803. Irwin began to hold prayer meetings with other Methodists of the British garrison as early as 1795 in a small room rented in Cape Town. The first Methodist lay preacher at the Cape, George Middlemiss, was a soldier of the British Army's 72nd Regiment of Foot who was stationed at the Cape Colony in 1805. This foundation paved the way for missionary work by Methodist missionary societies from Britain, many of whom sent missionaries with the 1820 Settlers to the Western and Eastern Cape. Among the most notable of the early missionaries were Barnabas Shaw and William Shaw. The largest group was the Wesleyan Methodist Church, but there were a number of others that joined to form the Methodist Church of South Africa, later known as the Methodist Church of Southern Africa.

The Methodist Church of Southern Africa is the largest mainline Protestant denomination in South Africa – 7.3% of the South African population recorded their religious affiliation as 'Methodist' in the last national census.

=== Asia ===
==== China ====
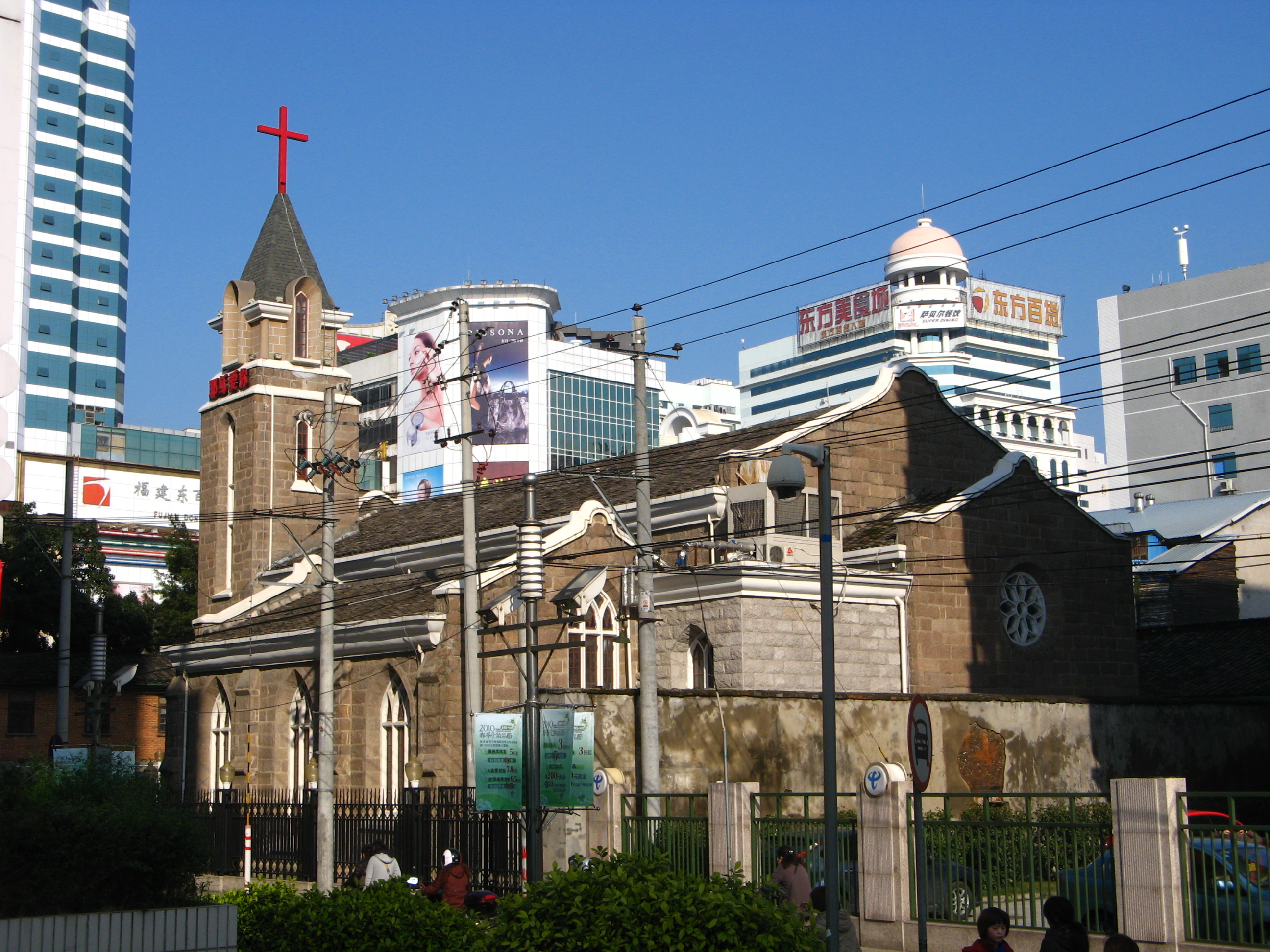
Flower Lane Church is the first Methodist church erected in downtown Fuzhou.

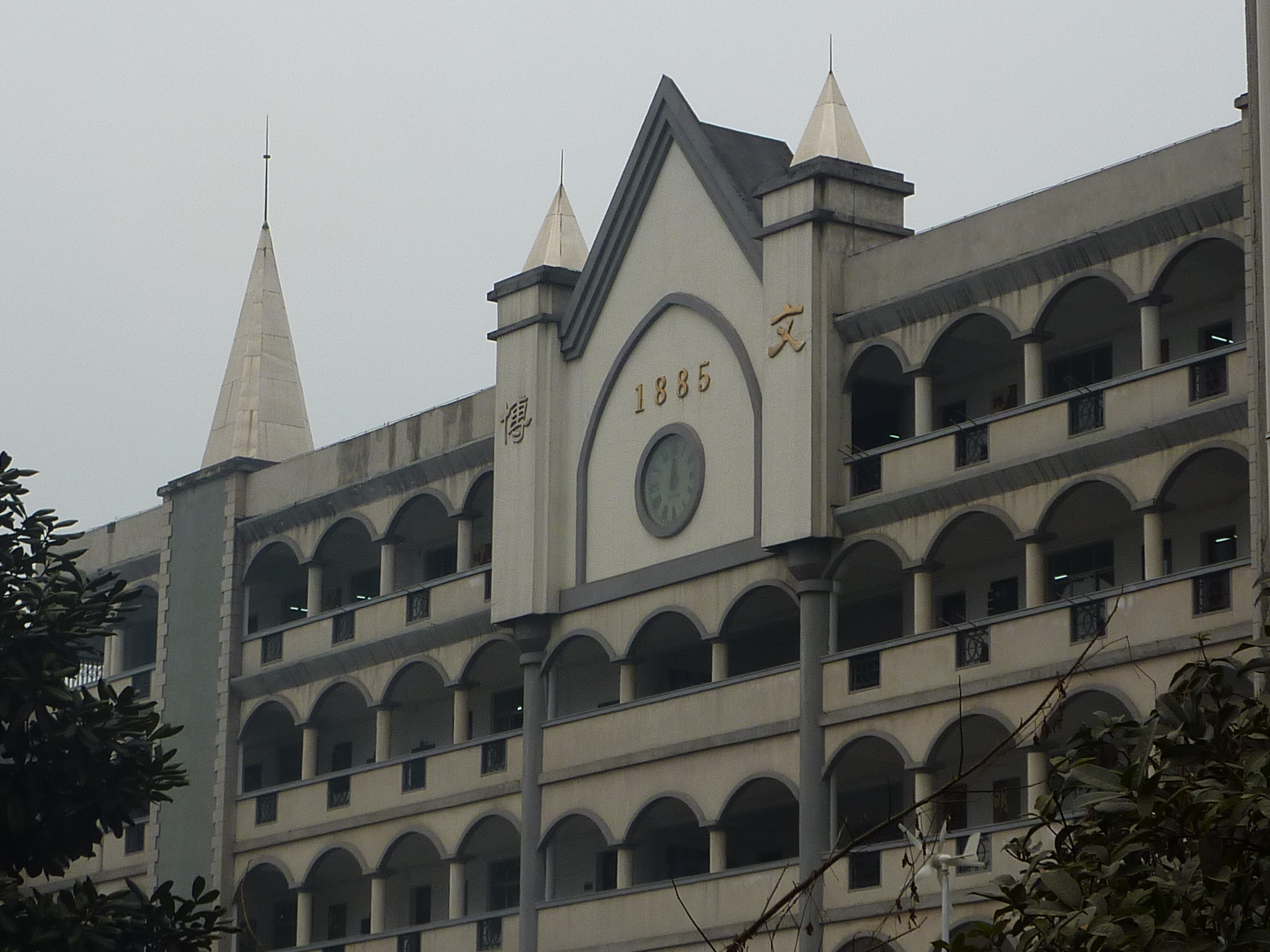
Former Methodist school in Wuhan (founded 1885)

Methodism was brought to China in the autumn of 1847 by the Methodist Episcopal Church. The first missionaries sent out were Judson Dwight Collins and Moses Clark White, who sailed from Boston 15 April 1847, and reached Fuzhou 6 September. They were followed by Henry Hickok and Robert Samuel Maclay, who arrived 15 April 1848. In 1857, the first convert was baptised in connection with its labours. In August 1856, a brick built church was dedicated named the "Church of the True God" (Chinese: 真神堂; pinyin: Zhēnshén táng), the first substantial church building erected in Fuzhou by Protestant Missions. In the winter of the same year another brick built church, located on the hill in the suburbs on the south bank of the Min, was finished and dedicated, called the "Church of Heavenly Peace". In 1862, the number of members was 87. The Fuzhou Conference was organized by Isaac W. Wiley on 6 December 1867, by which time the number of members and probationers had reached 2,011.

Hok Chau (周學; Zhōu Xué; also known as Lai-Tong Chau, 周勵堂; Zhōu Lìtáng) was the first ordained Chinese minister of the South China District of the Methodist Church (incumbent 1877–1916). Benjamin Hobson, a medical missionary sent by the London Missionary Society in 1839, set up Wai Ai Clinic (惠愛醫館; Huì ài yī guǎn). Liang Fa, Hok Chau and others worked there. Liang baptized Chau in 1852. The Methodist Church based in Britain sent missionary George Piercy to China. In 1851, Piercy went to Guangzhou (Canton), where he worked in a trading company. In 1853, he started a church in Guangzhou. In 1877, Chau was ordained by the Methodist Church, where he pastored for 39 years.

In 1867, the mission sent out the first missionaries to Central China, who began work at Jiujiang. In 1869, missionaries were also sent to the capital city Beijing, where they laid the foundations of the work of the North China Mission. In November 1880, the West China Mission was established in Sichuan Province. In 1896, the work in the Hinghua prefecture (modern-day Putian) and surrounding regions was also organized as a Mission Conference.

In 1947, the Methodist Church in the Republic of China celebrated its centenary. In 1949, however, the Methodist Church moved to Taiwan with the Kuomintang government.

==== India ====
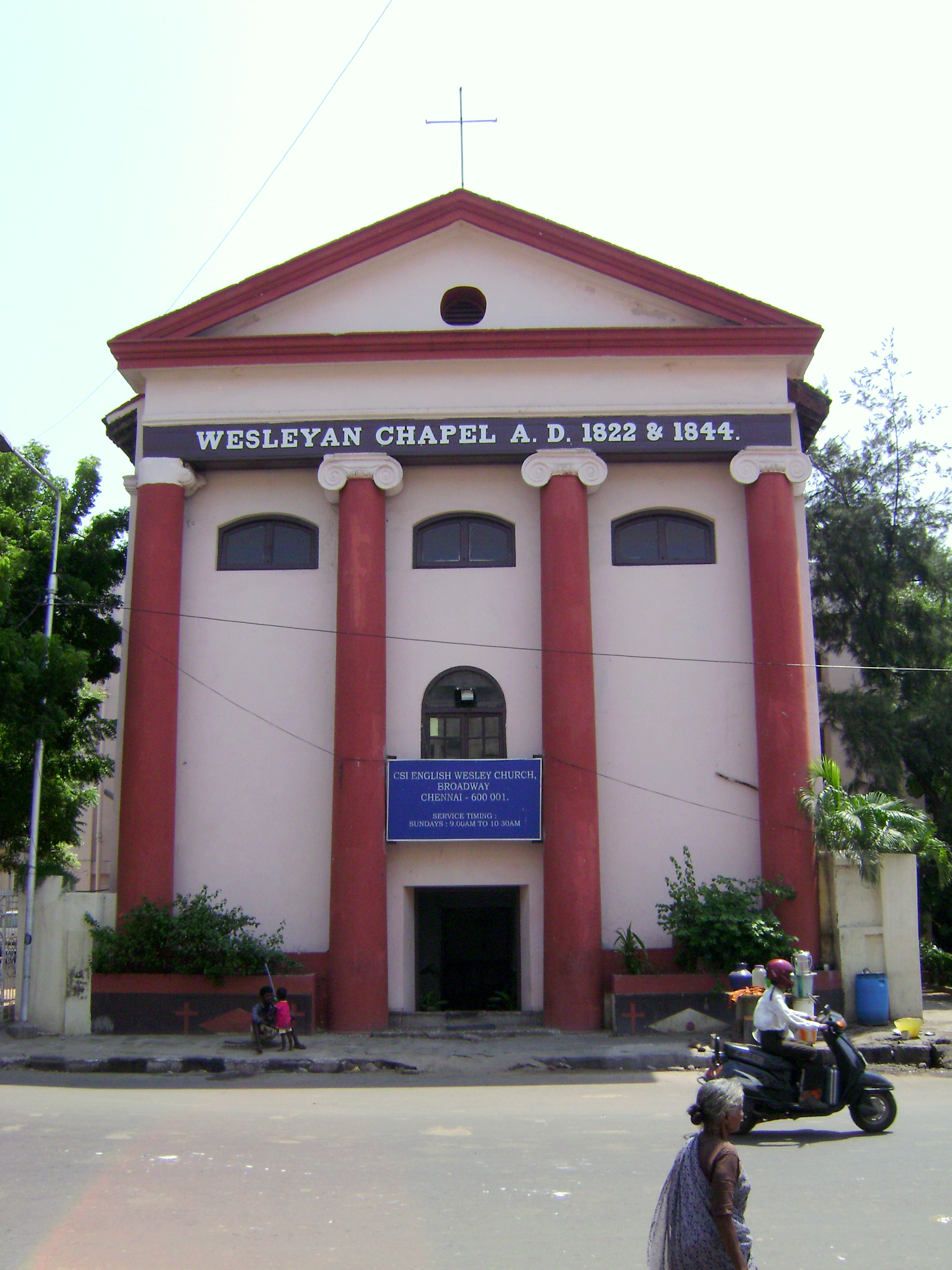
The CSI English Wesley Church in Chennai is one of the oldest Methodist chapels in India.

Methodism came to India twice, in 1817 and in 1856, according to P. Dayanandan who has extensively researched the subject. Thomas Coke and six other missionaries set sail for India on New Year's Day in 1814. Coke, then 66, died en route. Rev. James Lynch was the one who finally arrived in Madras in 1817 at a place called Black Town (Broadway), later known as George Town. Lynch conducted the first Methodist missionary service on 2 March 1817, in a stable.

The first Methodist church was dedicated in 1819 at Royapettah. A chapel at Broadway (Black Town) was later built and dedicated on 25 April 1822. This church was rebuilt in 1844 since the earlier structure was collapsing. A chapel at St. Thomas Mount was built on 1829. At this time there were about 100 Methodist members in all of Madras, and they were either Europeans or Eurasians (European and Indian descent). Among names associated with the founding period of Methodism in India are Elijah Hoole and Thomas Cryer, who came as missionaries to Madras.

In 1857, the Methodist Episcopal Church started its work in India, and with prominent evangelists like William Taylor of the Emmanuel Methodist Church, Vepery, born in 1874. Taylor and the evangelist James Mills Thoburn established the Thoburn Memorial Church in Calcutta in 1873 and the Calcutta Boys' School in 1877.

In 1947, the Wesleyan Methodist Church in India merged with Presbyterians, Anglicans and other Protestant churches to form the Church of South India while the American Methodist Church remained affiliated as the Methodist Church in Southern Asia (MCSA) to the mother church in the USA – the United Methodist Church until 1981, when by an enabling act, the Methodist Church in India (MCI) became an autonomous church in India. Today, the Methodist Church in India is governed by the General Conference of the Methodist Church of India headed by six bishops, with headquarters in Mumbai, India.

==== Malaysia and Singapore ====
Missionaries from Britain, North America, and Australia founded Methodist churches in many Commonwealth countries. These are now independent from their former "mother" churches. In addition to the churches, these missionaries often also founded schools to serve the local community. A good example of such schools are the Methodist Boys' School in Kuala Lumpur, Methodist Girls' School and Methodist Boys' School in George Town, and Anglo-Chinese School, Methodist Girls' School, Paya Lebar Methodist Girls School and Fairfield Methodist Schools in Singapore.

==== Philippines ====
Methodism in the Philippines began shortly after the United States acquired the Philippines in 1898 as a result the Spanish–American War. On 21 June 1898, after the Battle of Manila Bay but before the Treaty of Paris, executives of the American Mission Society of the Methodist Episcopal Church expressed their desire to join other Protestant denominations in starting mission work in the islands and to enter into a Comity Agreement that would facilitate the establishment of such missions. The first Protestant worship service was conducted on 28 August 1898 by an American military chaplain named George C. Stull. Stull was an ordained Methodist minister from the Montana Annual Conference of The Methodist Episcopal Church (later part of the United Methodist Church after 1968).

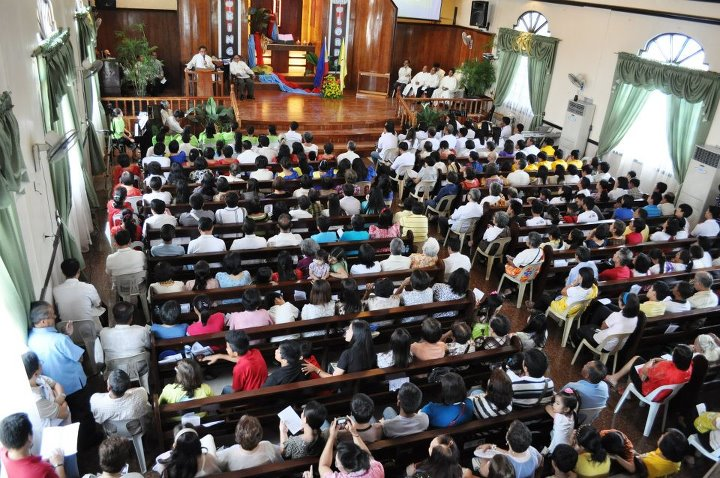
Consecration of the first Presiding Bishop of Ang Iglesia Metodista sa Pilipinas held at Luacan Church in Bataan, Philippines

Methodist and Wesleyan traditions in the Philippines are shared by three of the largest mainline Protestant churches in the country: The United Methodist Church in the Philippines, Iglesia Evangelica Metodista En Las Islas Filipinas ("Evangelical Methodist Church in the Philippine Islands", abbreviated IEMELIF), and The United Church of Christ in the Philippines. There are also evangelical Protestant churches in the country of the Methodist tradition like the Wesleyan Church of the Philippines, the Free Methodist Church of the Philippines, and the Church of the Nazarene. There are also the IEMELIF Reform Movement (IRM), The Wesleyan (Pilgrim Holiness) Church of the Philippines, the Philippine Bible Methodist Church, Incorporated, the Pentecostal Free Methodist Church, Incorporated, the Fundamental Christian Methodist Church, The Reformed Methodist Church, Incorporated, The Methodist Church of the Living Bread, Incorporated, and the Wesley Evangelical Methodist Church & Mission, Incorporated.

There are three episcopal areas of the United Methodist Church in the Philippines: the Baguio Episcopal Area, Davao Episcopal Area and Manila Episcopal Area.

A call for autonomy from groups within the United Methodist Church in the Philippines was discussed at several conferences led mostly by episcopal candidates. This led to the establishment of the Ang Iglesia Metodista sa Pilipinas ("The Methodist Church in the Philippines") in 2010, led by Bishop Lito C. Tangonan, George Buenaventura, Chita Milan and Joe Frank E. Zuñiga. The group finally declared full autonomy and legal incorporation with the Securities and Exchange Commission was approved on 7 December 2011 with papers held by present procurators. It now has 126 local churches in Metro Manila, Palawan, Bataan, Zambales, Pangasinan, Bulacan, Aurora, Nueva Ecija, as well as parts of Pampanga and Cavite. Tangonan was consecrated as the denomination's first Presiding Bishop on 17 March 2012.

==== South Korea ====
The Korean Methodist Church (KMC) is one of the largest churches in South Korea with around 1.5 million members and 8,306 ministers. Methodism in Korea grew out of British and American mission work which began in the late 19th century. The first missionary was Robert Samuel Maclay of the Methodist Episcopal Church, who sailed from Japan in 1884 and was given the authority of medical and schooling permission from emperor Gojong. The Korean church became fully autonomous in 1930, retaining affiliation with Methodist churches in America and later the United Methodist Church. The church experienced rapid growth in membership throughout most of the 20th century – in spite of the Korean War – before stabilizing in the 1990s. The KMC is a member of the World Methodist Council and hosted the first Asia Methodist Convention in 2001.

There are many Korean-language Methodist churches in North America catering to Korean-speaking immigrants.

==== Taiwan ====
In 1947, the Methodist Church in the Republic of China celebrated its centenary. In 1949, however, the Methodist Church moved to Taiwan with the Kuomintang government. On 21 June 1953, Taipei Methodist Church was erected, then local churches and chapels with a baptized membership numbering over 2,500. Various types of educational, medical and social services are provided (including Tunghai University). In 1972, the Methodist Church in the Republic of China became autonomous, and the first bishop was installed in 1986.

=== Americas ===
==== Brazil ====
The Methodist Church in Brazil was founded by American missionaries in 1867 after an initial unsuccessful founding in 1835. It has grown steadily since, becoming autonomous in 1930. In the 1970s it ordained its first woman minister. In 1975 it also founded the first Methodist university in Latin America, the Methodist University of Piracicaba. As of 2011, the Brazilian Methodist Church is divided into eight annual conferences with 162,000 members.

==== Canada ====
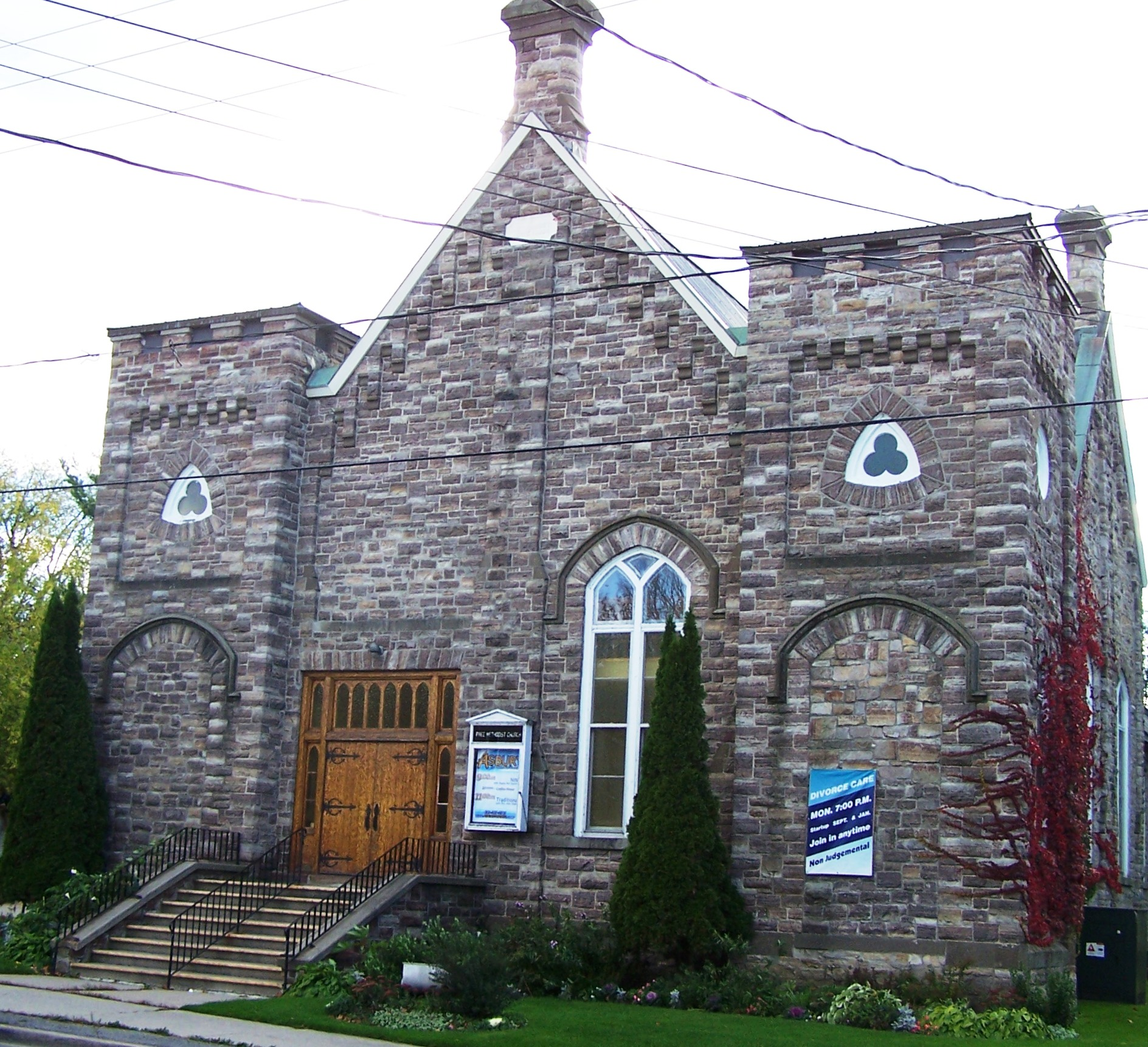
Asbury Free Methodist Church in Ontario

The father of Methodism in Canada was Rev. Coughlan, who arrived in Newfoundland in 1763, where he opened a school and travelled widely.

The second was William Black (1760–1834) who began preaching in settlements along the Petitcodiac River of New Brunswick in 1781. A few years afterwards, Methodist Episcopal circuit riders from the U.S. state of New York began to arrive in Canada West at Niagara, and the north shore of Lake Erie in 1786, and at the Kingston region on the northeast shore of Lake Ontario in the early 1790s. At the time the region was part of British North America and became part of Upper Canada after the Constitutional Act of 1791. Upper and Lower Canada were both parts of the New York Episcopal Methodist Conference until 1810 when they were transferred to the newly formed Genesee Conference. Reverend Major George Neal began to preach in Niagara in October 1786 and was ordained in 1810 by Bishop Philip Asbury, at the Lyons, New York Methodist Conference. He was Canada's first saddlebag preacher and travelled from Lake Ontario to Detroit for 50 years preaching the gospel.

The spread of Methodism in the Canadas was seriously disrupted by the War of 1812 but quickly gained lost ground after the Treaty of Ghent was signed in 1815. In 1817, the British Wesleyans arrived in the Canadas from the Maritimes but by 1820 had agreed, with the Episcopal Methodists, to confine their work to Lower Canada (present-day Quebec) while the latter would confine themselves to Upper Canada (present-day Ontario). In the summer of 1818, the first place of public worship was erected for the Wesleyan Methodists in York, later Toronto. The chapel for the First Methodist Church was built on the corner of King Street and Jordan Street, the entire cost of the building was $250, an amount that took the congregation three years to raise. In 1828, Upper Canadian Methodists were permitted by the General Conference in the United States to form an independent Canadian Conference and, in 1833, the Canadian Conference merged with the British Wesleyans to form the Wesleyan Methodist Church in Canada. In 1884, most Canadian Methodists were brought under the umbrella of the Methodist Church, Canada.

In the fall of 1873 and winter of 1874, General Superintendent B. T. Roberts of the Free Methodist Church visited Scarborough on the invitation of Robert Loveless, a Primitive Methodist layman. Later, in 1876 while presiding over the very young North Michigan Conference, he read conference appointments that assigned C.H. Sage his field of labour—Canada. This led to the expansion of the Free Methodist Church in Canada.

In 1925, the Methodist Church, Canada and most Presbyterian congregations (then by far the largest Protestant communion in Canada), most Congregational Union of Ontario and Quebec congregations, Union Churches in Western Canada, and the American Presbyterian Church in Montreal merged to form the United Church of Canada. In 1968, the Evangelical United Brethren Church's Canadian congregations joined the United Church of Canada.

The Free Methodist Church in Canada is the largest Methodist denomination in the country at present. A smaller denomination, the British Methodist Episcopal Church, remains active today as well.

==== Mexico ====
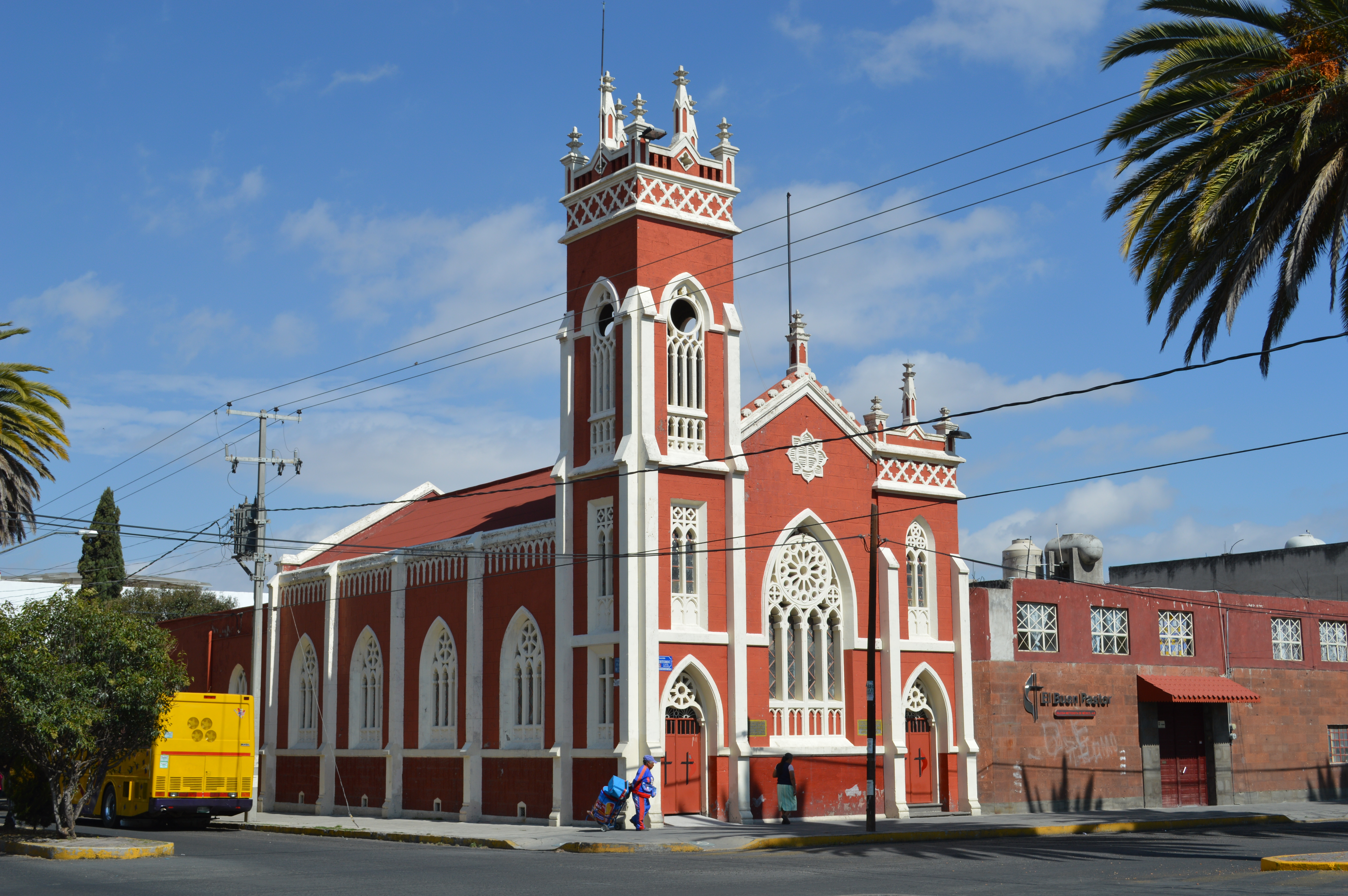
A Methodist church in Apizaco, Tlaxcala

The Methodist Church came to Mexico in 1872, with the arrival of two Methodist commissioners from the United States to observe the possibilities of evangelistic work in México. In December 1872, Bishop Gilbert Haven arrived in Mexico City. He was ordered by M. D. William Butler to go to México. Bishop John C. Keener arrived from the Methodist Episcopal Church, South in January 1873.

In 1874, M. D. William Butler established the first Protestant Methodist school of México, in Puebla. The school was founded under the name "Instituto Metodista Mexicano". Today the school is called "Instituto Mexicano Madero". It is still a Methodist school, and it is one of the most elite, selective, expensive and prestigious private schools in the country, with two campuses in Puebla State, and one in Oaxaca. A few years later the principal of the school created a Methodist university.

On 18 January 1885, the first Annual Conference of the United Episcopal Church of México was established.

==== United States ====
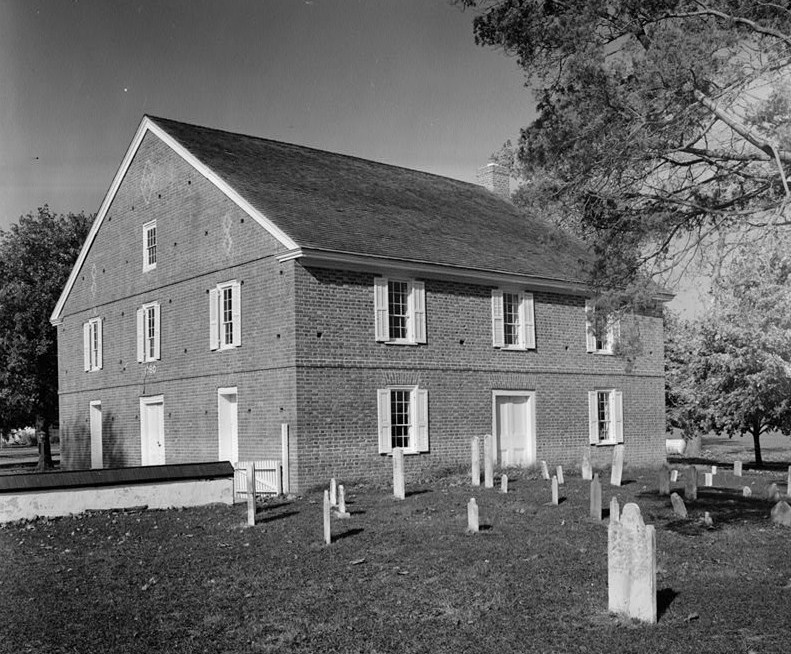
Barratt's Chapel, built in 1780, is the oldest Methodist church in the United States built for that purpose. The church was a meeting place of Asbury and Coke.

Wesley came to believe that the New Testament evidence did not leave the power of ordination to the priesthood in the hands of bishops but that other priests could ordain. In 1784, he ordained preachers for Scotland, England, and America, with power to administer the sacraments (this was a major reason for Methodism's final split from the Church of England after Wesley's death). At that time, Wesley sent Thomas Coke to America. Francis Asbury founded the Methodist Episcopal Church at the Baltimore Christmas Conference in 1784; Coke (already ordained in the Church of England) ordained Asbury deacon, elder, and bishop each on three successive days. Circuit riders, many of whom were laymen, travelled by horseback to preach the gospel and establish churches in many places. One of the most famous circuit riders was Robert Strawbridge who lived in the vicinity of Carroll County, Maryland, soon after arriving in the Colonies around 1760.

The First Great Awakening was a religious movement in the 1730s and 1740s, beginning in New Jersey, then spreading to New England, and eventually south into Virginia and North Carolina. George Whitefield played a major role, traveling across the colonies and preaching in a dramatic and emotional style, accepting everyone as his audience.

The new style of sermons and the way people practiced their faith breathed new life into religion in America. People became passionately and emotionally involved in their religion, rather than passively listening to intellectual discourse in a detached manner. People began to study the Bible at home. The effect was akin to the individualistic trends present in Europe during the Protestant Reformation.

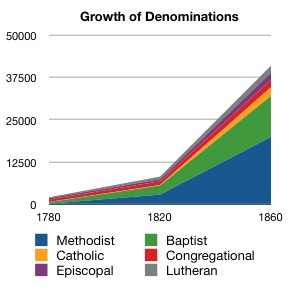
In the US, the number of local Methodist churches (blue) grew steadily; it was the largest denomination in the US by 1820.

The Second Great Awakening was a nationwide wave of revivals, from 1790 to 1840. In New England, the renewed interest in religion inspired a wave of social activism among Yankees; Methodism grew and established several colleges, notably Boston University. In the "burned over district" of western New York, the spirit of revival burned brightly. Methodism saw the emergence of a Holiness movement. In the west, especially at Cane Ridge, Kentucky, and in Tennessee, the revival strengthened the Methodists and the Baptists. Methodism grew rapidly in the Second Great Awakening, becoming the nation's largest denomination by 1820. From 58,000 members in 1790, it reached 258,000 in 1820 and 1,661,000 in 1860, growing by a factor of 28.6 in 70 years, while the total American population grew by a factor of eight. Other denominations also used revivals, but the Methodists grew fastest of all because "they combined popular appeal with efficient organization under the command of missionary bishops." Methodism attracted German immigrants, and the first German Methodist Church was erected in Cincinnati, Ohio.

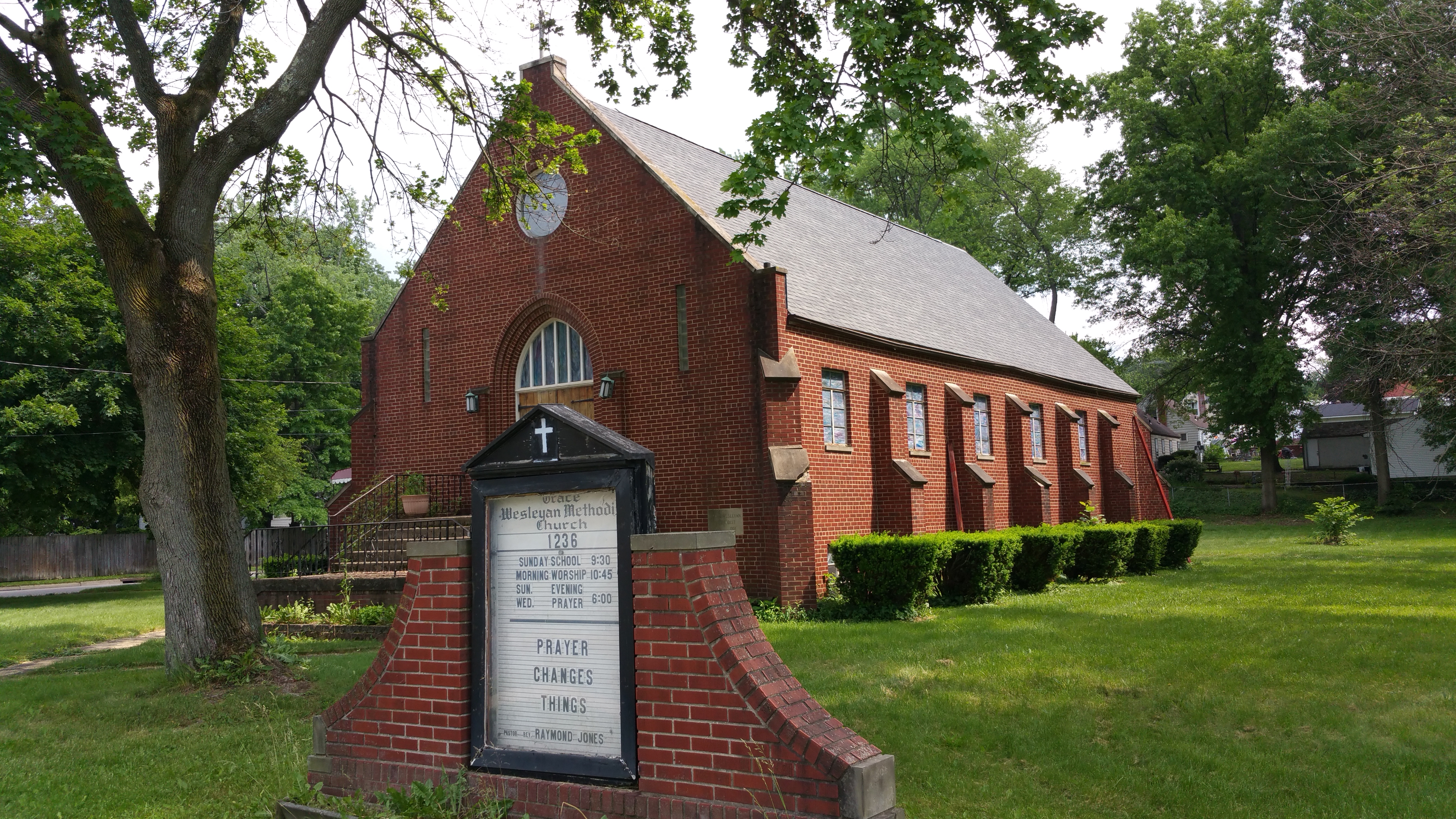
Grace Wesleyan Methodist Church is a parish church of the Allegheny Wesleyan Methodist Connection, one of the largest denominations in the conservative holiness movement, and is located in Akron, Ohio.

Disputes over slavery placed the church in difficulty in the first half of the 19th century, with the northern church leaders fearful of a split with the South, and reluctant to take a stand. The Wesleyan Methodist Connexion (later renamed the Wesleyan Methodist Church) and the Free Methodist Church were formed by staunch abolitionists, and the Free Methodists were especially active in the Underground Railroad, which helped to free slaves. In 1962, the Evangelical Wesleyan Church separated from the Free Methodist Church. In 1968 the Wesleyan Methodist Church and Pilgrim Holiness Church merged to form the Wesleyan Church; a significant amount dissented from this decision resulting in the independence of the Allegheny Wesleyan Methodist Connection and the formation of the Bible Methodist Connection of Churches, both of which fall within the conservative holiness movement.

In a much larger split, in 1845 at Louisville, Kentucky, the churches of the slaveholding states left the Methodist Episcopal Church and formed the Methodist Episcopal Church, South. The northern and southern branches were reunited in 1939, when slavery was no longer an issue. In this merger also joined the Methodist Protestant Church. Some southerners, more conservative in theology, opposed the merger, and formed the Southern Methodist Church in 1940.

The Third Great Awakening from 1858 to 1908 saw enormous growth in Methodist membership, and a proliferation of institutions such as colleges (e.g., Morningside College). Methodists were often involved in the Missionary Awakening and the Social Gospel Movement. The awakening in so many cities in 1858 started the movement, but in the North it was interrupted by the Civil War. In the South, on the other hand, the Civil War stimulated revivals, especially in Lee's army.

In 1914–1917 many Methodist ministers made strong pleas for world peace. President Woodrow Wilson (a Presbyterian), promised "a war to end all wars", using language of a future peace that had been a watchword for the postmillennial movement. In the 1930s many Methodists favored isolationist policies. Thus in 1936, Methodist Bishop James Baker, of the San Francisco Conference, released a poll of ministers showing 56% opposed warfare. However, the Methodist Federation called for a boycott of Japan, which had invaded China and was disrupting missionary activity there. In Chicago, 62 local African Methodist Episcopal churches voted their support for the Roosevelt administration's policy, while opposing any plan to send American troops overseas to fight. When war came in 1941, the vast majority of Methodists supported the national war effort, but there were also a few (673) conscientious objectors.

The "cross and flame" logo of the United Methodist Church

The United Methodist Church (UMC) was formed in 1968 as a result of a merger between the Evangelical United Brethren Church (EUB) and the Methodist Church. The former church had resulted from mergers of several groups of German Methodist heritage; however, there was no longer any need or desire to worship in the German language. The latter church was a result of union between the Methodist Protestant Church and the northern and southern factions of the Methodist Episcopal Church. The merged church had approximately nine million members as of the late 1990s. While United Methodist Church in America membership has been declining, associated groups in developing countries are growing rapidly. Prior to the merger that led to the formation of the United Methodist Church, the Evangelical Methodist Church entered into a schism with the Methodist Church, citing modernism in its parent body as the reason for the departure in 1946.

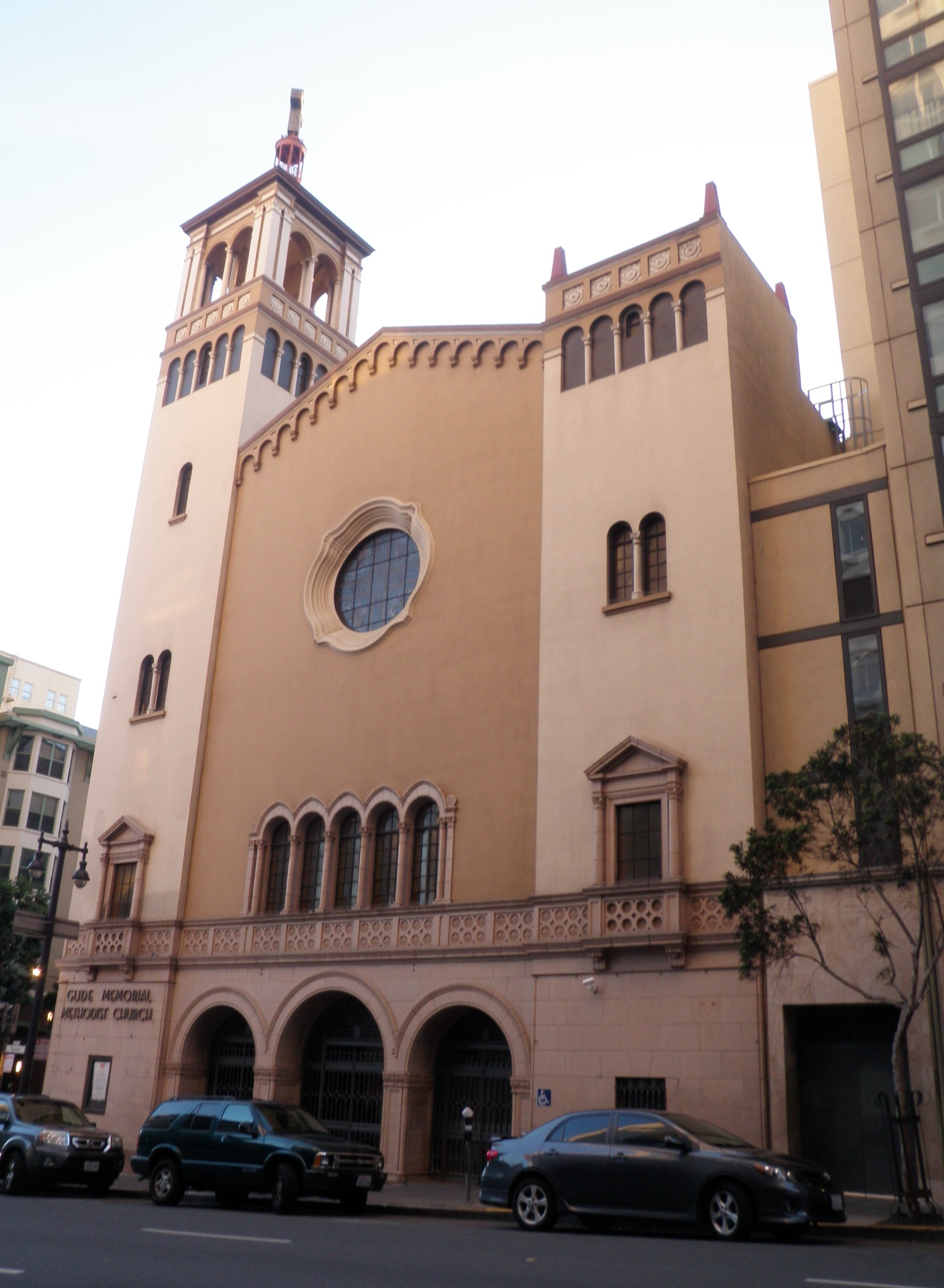
Founded as a Methodist congregation, Glide Memorial Church has served as a counter-culture rallying point and has been identified as a liberal church.

American Methodist churches are generally organized on a connectional model, related, but not identical to that used in Britain. Pastors are assigned to congregations by bishops, distinguishing it from presbyterian government. Methodist denominations typically give lay members representation at regional and national Conferences at which the business of the church is conducted, making it different from most episcopal government. This connectional organizational model differs further from the congregational model, for example of Baptist, and Congregationalist Churches, among others.

In addition to the United Methodist Church, there are over 40 other denominations that descend from John Wesley's Methodist movement. Some, such as the African Methodist Episcopal Church, the Free Methodists and the Wesleyan Church (formerly Wesleyan Methodist), are explicitly Methodist. There are also independent Methodist churches, many of which are affiliated with the Association of Independent Methodists. The Salvation Army and the Church of the Nazarene adhere to Methodist theology.

The Holiness Revival was primarily among people of Methodist persuasion, who felt that the church had once again become apathetic, losing the Wesleyan zeal. Some important events of this revival were the writings of Phoebe Palmer during the mid-1800s, the establishment of the first of many holiness camp meetings at Vineland, New Jersey, in 1867, and the founding of Asbury College (1890), and other similar institutions in the U.S. around the turn of the 20th century.

In 2020, United Methodists announced a plan to split the denomination over the issue of same-sex marriage, which resulted in traditionalist clergy, laity and theologians forming the Global Methodist Church, an evangelical Methodist denomination that came into being on 1 May 2022.

=== Oceania ===
Methodism is particularly widespread in some Pacific Island nations, such as Fiji, Samoa and Tonga.

==== Australia ====
In the 19th century there were annual conferences in each Australasian colony (including New Zealand). Various branches of Methodism in Australia merged during the 20 years from 1881. The Methodist Church of Australasia was formed on 1 January 1902 when five Methodist denominations in Australia – the Wesleyan Methodist Church, the Primitive Methodists, the Bible Christian Church, the United Methodist Free and the Methodist New Connexion Churches merged. In polity it largely followed the Wesleyan Methodist Church.

In 1945 Kingsley Ridgway offered himself as a Melbourne-based "field representative" for a possible Australian branch of the Wesleyan Methodist Church of America, after meeting an American serviceman who was a member of that denomination. The Wesleyan Methodist Church of Australia was founded on his work.

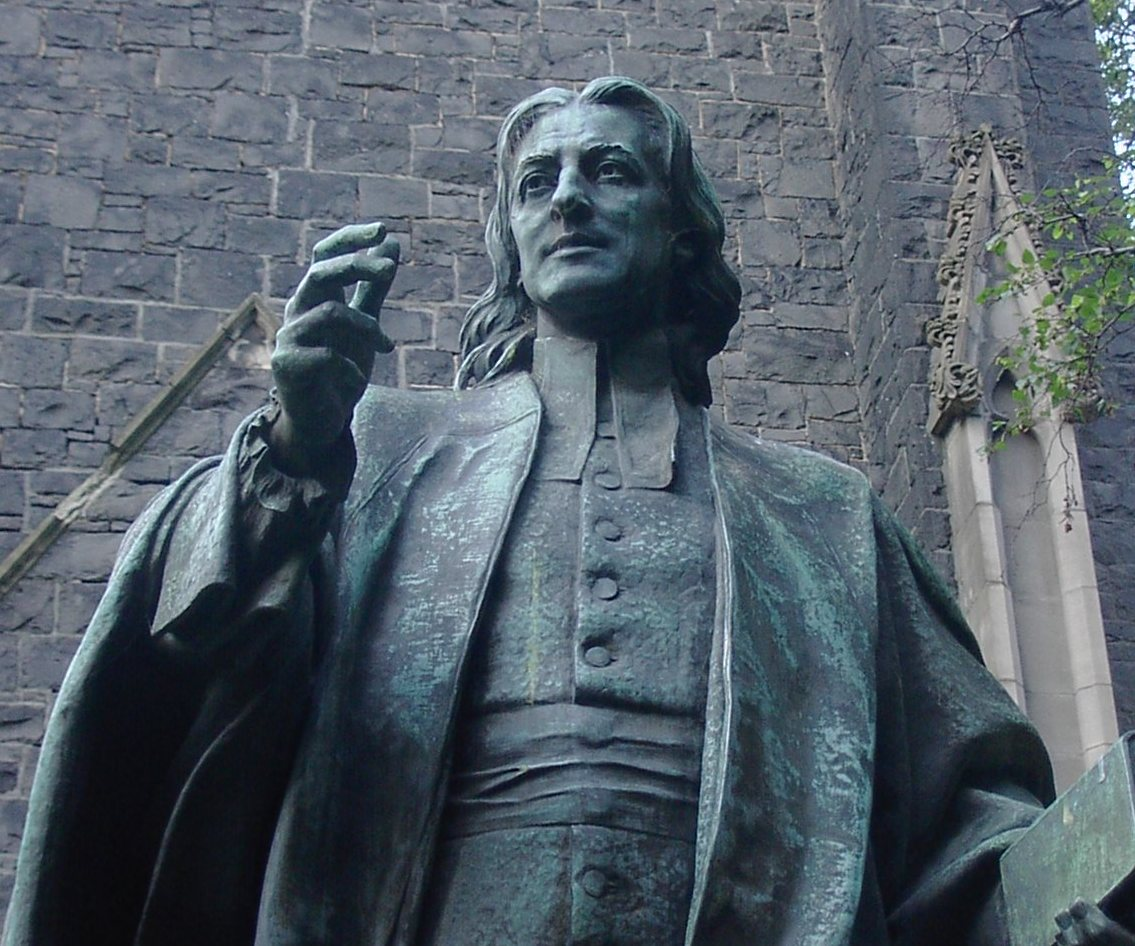
Statue of John Wesley outside Wesley Church in Melbourne, Australia

The Methodist Church of Australasia merged with the majority of the Presbyterian Church of Australia and the Congregational Union of Australia in 1977, becoming the Uniting Church. The Wesleyan Methodist Church of Australia and some independent congregations chose not to join the union.

Wesley Mission in Pitt Street, Sydney, the largest parish in the Uniting Church, remains strongly in the Wesleyan tradition. There are many local churches named after John Wesley.

From the mid-1980s a number of independent Methodist churches were founded by missionaries and other members from the Methodist Churches of Malaysia and Singapore. Some of these came together to form what is now known as the Chinese Methodist Church in Australia in 1993, and it held its first full Annual Conference in 2002. Since the 2000s many independent Methodist churches have also been established or grown by Tongan immigrants.

==== Fiji ====
As a result of the early efforts of missionaries, most of the natives of the Fiji Islands were converted to Methodism in the 1840s and 1850s. According to the 2007 census, 34.6% of the population (including almost two-thirds of ethnic Fijians), are adherents of Methodism, making Fiji one of the most Methodist nations. The Methodist Church of Fiji and Rotuma, the largest religious denomination, is an important social force along with the traditional chiefly system. In the past, the church once called for a theocracy and fueled anti-Hindu sentiment.

==== New Zealand ====
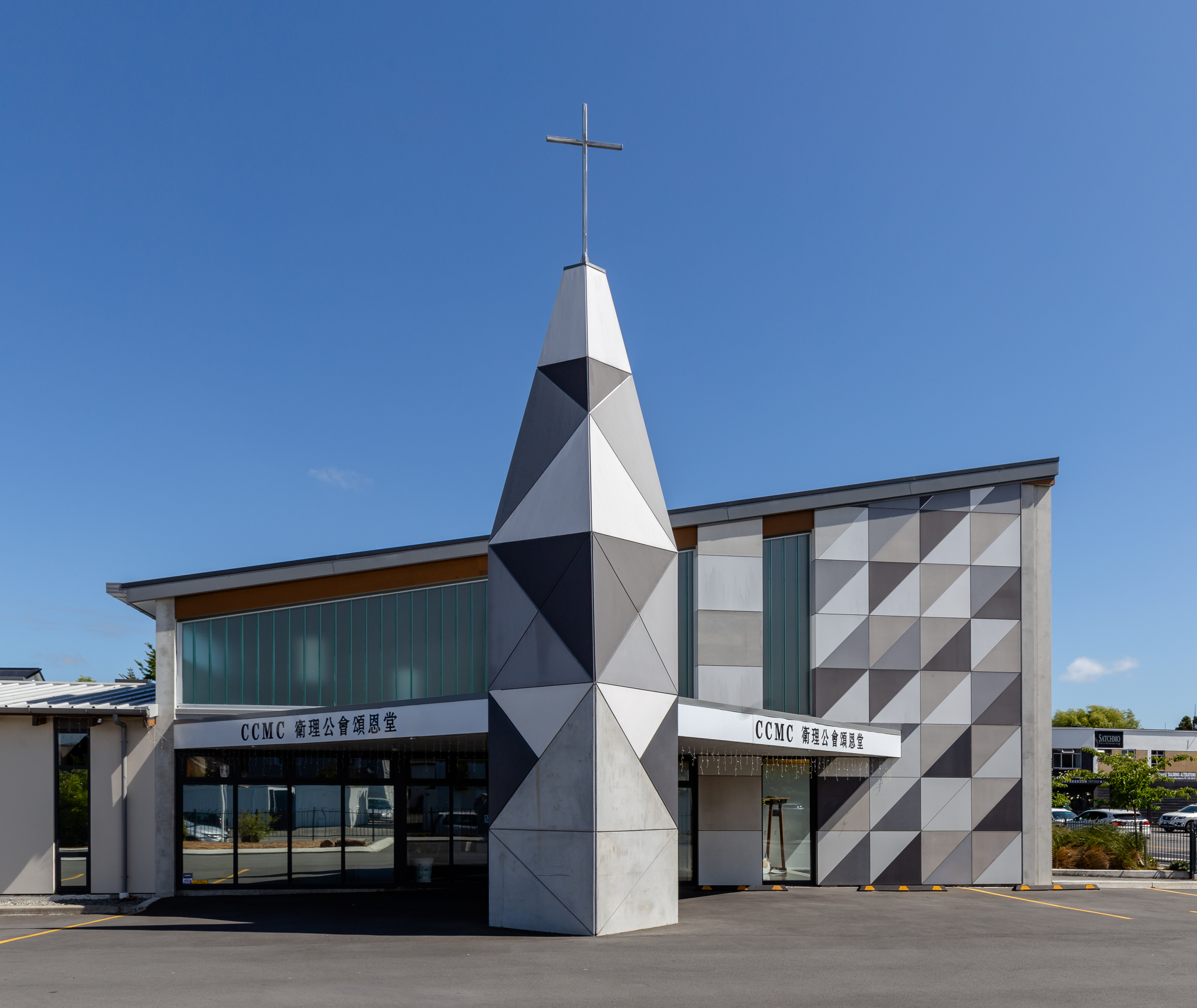
Chinese Methodist Church, Christchurch, New Zealand

In June 1823 Wesleydale, the first Wesleyan Methodist mission in New Zealand, was established at Kaeo. The Methodist Church of New Zealand, which is directly descended from the 19th-century missionaries, was the fourth-most common Christian denomination recorded in the 2018 New Zealand census.

Since the early 1990s, missionaries and other Methodists from Malaysia and Singapore established Methodist churches around major urban areas in New Zealand. These congregations came together to form the Chinese Methodist Church in New Zealand (CMCNZ) in 2003.

==== Samoan Islands ====
The Methodist Church is the third largest denomination throughout the Samoan Islands, in both Samoa and American Samoa. In 1868, Piula Theological College was established in Lufilufi on the north coast of Upolu island in Samoa and serves as the main headquarters of the Methodist church in the country. The college includes the historic Piula Monastery as well as Piula Cave Pool, a natural spring situated beneath the church by the sea.

==== Tonga ====
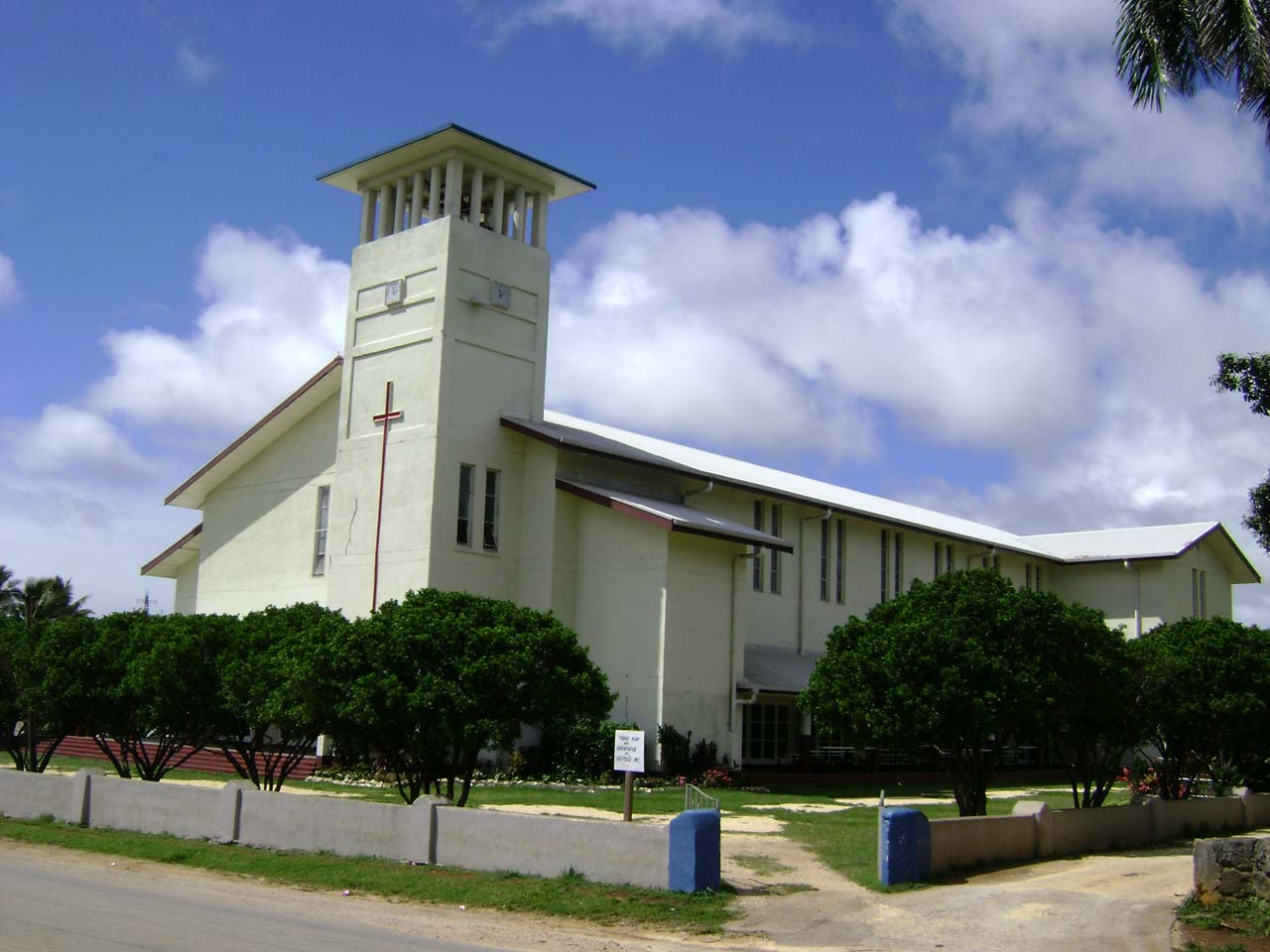
Saione, the church of the king – the main Free Wesleyan Church of Kolomotuʻa, Tonga

Methodism had a particular resonance with the inhabitants of Tonga. In the 1830s Wesleyan missionaries converted paramount chief Taufa'ahau Tupou who in turn converted fellow islanders. Today, Methodism is represented on the islands by the Free Church of Tonga and the Free Wesleyan Church, which is the largest church in Tonga. As of 2011 48% of Tongans adhered to Methodist churches. The royal family of the country are prominent members of the Free Wesleyan Church, and the late king was a lay preacher. Tongan Methodist minister Sione 'Amanaki Havea developed coconut theology, which tailors theology to a Pacific Islands context.

== Ecumenical relations ==
Many Methodists have been involved in the ecumenical movement, which has sought to unite the fractured denominations of Christianity. Because Methodism grew out of the Church of England, a denomination from which neither of the Wesley brothers seceded, some Methodist scholars and historians, such as Rupert E. Davies, have regarded their 'movement' more as a preaching order within wider Christian life than as a church, comparing them with the Franciscans, who formed a religious order within the medieval European church and not a separate denomination. Certainly, Methodists have been deeply involved in early examples of church union, especially the United Church of Canada and the Church of South India.

A disproportionate number of Methodists take part in inter-faith dialogue. For example, Wesley Ariarajah, a long-serving director of the World Council of Churches' sub-unit on "Dialogue with People of Living Faiths and Ideologies" is a Methodist.

In October 1999, an executive committee of the World Methodist Council resolved to explore the possibility of its member churches becoming associated with the doctrinal agreement which had been reached by the Catholic Church and Lutheran World Federation (LWF). In May 2006, the International Methodist–Catholic Dialogue Commission completed its most recent report, entitled "The Grace Given You in Christ: Catholics and Methodists Reflect Further on the Church", and submitted the text to Methodist and Catholic authorities. In July of the same year, in Seoul, South Korea, the Member Churches of the World Methodist Council (WMC) voted to approve and sign a "Methodist Statement of Association" with the Joint Declaration on the Doctrine of Justification, the agreement which was reached and officially accepted in 1999 by the Catholic Church and the Lutheran World Federation and which proclaimed that:

"Together we confess: By grace alone, in faith in Christ's saving work and not because of any merit on our part, we are accepted by God and receive the Holy Spirit, who renews our hearts while equipping and calling us to good works... as sinners our new life is solely due to the forgiving and renewing mercy that God imparts as a gift and that we receive in faith, and never can merit in any way," affirming "fundamental doctrinal agreement" concerning justification between the Catholic Church, the LWF, and the World Methodist Council.

This is not to say there is perfect agreement between the three denominational traditions; while Catholics and Methodists believe that salvation involves cooperation between God and man, Lutherans believe that God brings about the salvation of individuals without any cooperation on their part.

Commenting on the ongoing dialogues with Catholic Church leaders, Ken Howcroft, Methodist minister and the Ecumenical Officer for the Methodist Church of Great Britain, noted that "these conversations have been immensely fruitful." Methodists are increasingly recognizing that the 15 centuries prior to the Reformation constitute a shared history with Catholics, and are gaining new appreciation for neglected aspects of the Catholic tradition. There are, however, important unresolved doctrinal differences separating Roman Catholicism and Methodism, which include "the nature and validity of the ministry of those who preside at the Eucharist [Holy Communion], the precise meaning of the Eucharist as the sacramental 'memorial' of Christ's saving death and resurrection, the particular way in which Christ is present in Holy Communion, and the link between eucharistic communion and ecclesial communion".

In the 1960s, the Methodist Church of Great Britain made ecumenical overtures to the Church of England, aimed at denominational union. Formally, these failed when they were rejected by the Church of England's General Synod in 1972; conversations and co-operation continued, however, leading in 2003 to the signing of a covenant between the two churches. From the 1970s onward, the Methodist Church also started several Local Ecumenical Projects (LEPs, later renamed Local Ecumenical Partnerships) with local neighbouring denominations, which involved sharing churches, schools and in some cases ministers. In many towns and villages Methodists are involved in LEPs which are sometimes with Anglican or Baptist churches, but most commonly Methodist and United Reformed Church. In terms of belief, practice and churchmanship, many Methodists see themselves as closer to the United Reformed Church (another Nonconformist church) than to the Church of England. In the 1990s and early 21st century, the British Methodist Church was involved in the Scottish Church Initiative for Union, seeking greater unity with the established and Presbyterian Church of Scotland, the Scottish Episcopal Church and the United Reformed Church in Scotland.

The Methodist Church of Great Britain is a member of several ecumenical organisations, including the World Council of Churches, the Conference of European Churches, the Community of Protestant Churches in Europe, Churches Together in Britain and Ireland, Churches Together in England, Action of Churches Together in Scotland and Cytûn (Wales).

Methodist denominations in the United States have also strengthened ties with other Christian traditions. In April 2005, bishops in the United Methodist Church approved A Proposal for Interim Eucharistic Sharing. This document was the first step toward full communion with the Evangelical Lutheran Church in America (ELCA). The ELCA approved this same document in August 2005. At the 2008 General Conference, the United Methodist Church approved full communion with the ELCA. The UMC is also in dialogue with the Episcopal Church for full communion. The UMC and ELC worked together on a document called "Confessing Our Faith Together".

== See also ==
- List of Methodists
  - List of Methodist theologians
- List of Methodist churches
- List of Methodist denominations
- Saints in Methodism
- William Taylor (bishop) (1821–1902) — Missionary who introduced or promoted Methodism in a number of countries around the world.
- William Seward (preacher) — Close associate of George Whitefield and the First Methodist to be martyed
- Divergence between Anglicanism and Methodism
