= Baptismal vows =

Answers required of an adult candidate for baptism

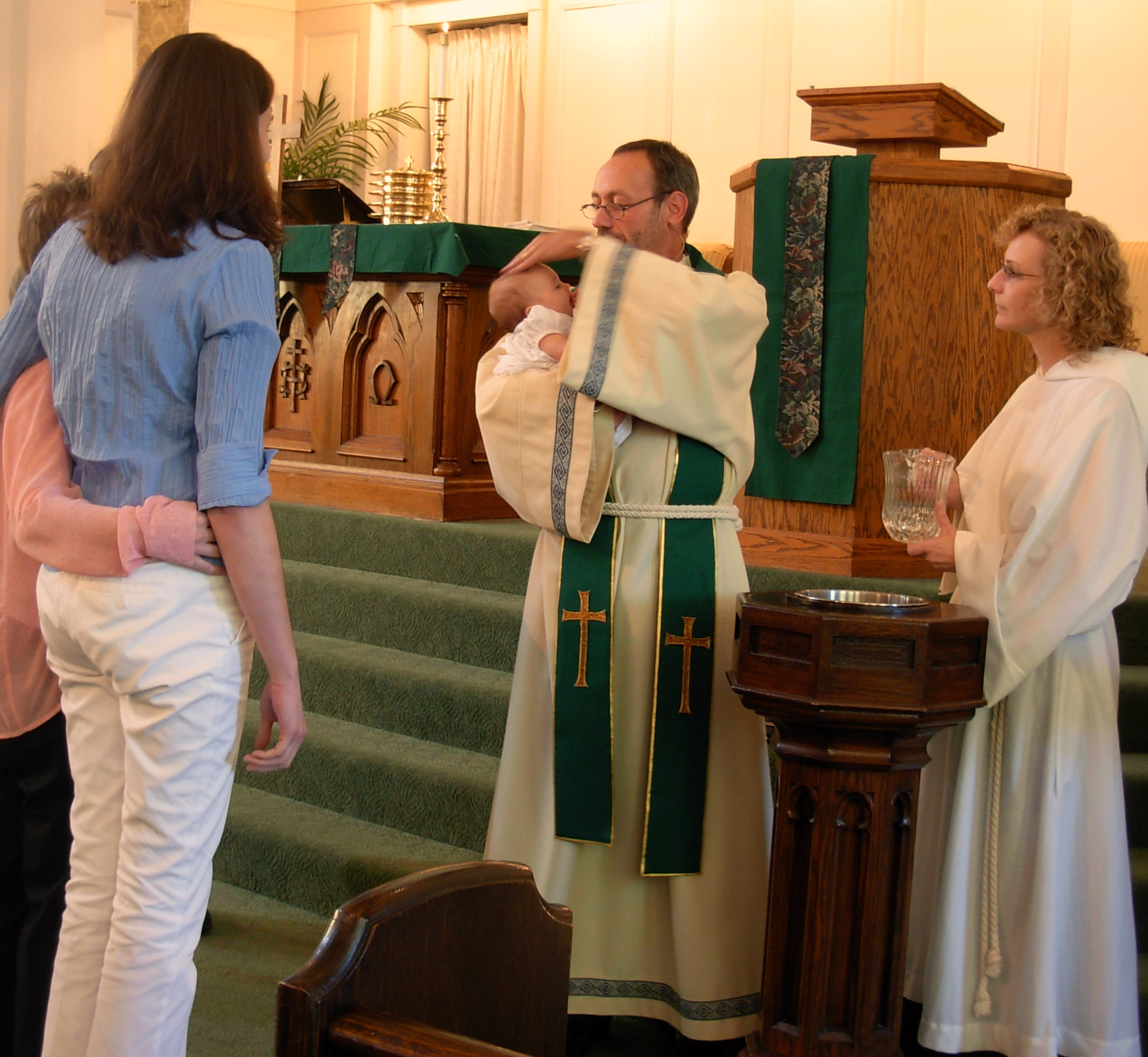
Baptismal vows are taken by the candidate, godparents, or parents when an individual receives the sacrament of baptism.

Baptismal vows are the answers required of an adult candidate for baptism just before the sacrament is conferred. In the case of an infant baptism they are given by the godparents (sponsors) or parents themselves. In many Christian denominations, the taking of baptismal vows incorporates a person into church membership.

== Questions for candidates ==
According to the Roman Ritual of the Catholic Church, first, three the person to be baptized is asked to renounce evil: "Do you renounce Satan? and all his works? and all his pomps?" To each of these interrogations the person, or the sponsor in his name, answers: "I do renounce". These "vows of renunciation" are then followed by the profession of faith in Father, Son and Holy Spirit. The person being baptised or their sponsor/s answers three questions prefaced with the words "Do you believe..." before the baptism is performed. Along similar lines, the Sunday Service of the Methodists, the first liturgical book of Methodism, contains the following baptismal vows:

Question. Dost thou renounce Satan and all his works, the vain pomp and glory of the world, with all covetous desires of the same, and the carnal desires of the flesh, so that thou wilt not follow, or be led by them?
Answer. I renounce them all.
Question. Dost thou believe in God the Father Almighty, Maker of heaven and earth. And in Jesus Christ his only begotten Son our Lord? And that he was conceived by the Holy Ghost; born of the Virgin Mary; that he suffered under Pontius Pilate, was crucified, dead, and buried; that he went down into hell, and also did rise again the third day; that he ascended into heaven, and sitteth at the right hand of God the Father Almighty; and from thence he shall come again, at the end of the world, to judge the quick and the dead? And doth thou believe in the Holy Ghost; the Holy Catholic Church; the Communion of Saints; the Remission of Sins; the Resurrection of the Body; and everlasting Life after Death?
Answer. All this I steadfastly believe.
Question. Wilt thou be baptized in this faith?
Answer. This is my desire.
Question. Wilt thou then obediently keep God's holy will and commandments, and walk in the same all the days of thy life?
Answer. I will endeavour so to do, God being my helper.

== Renewal of baptismal vows ==
In Roman Catholicism, Lutheranism and Anglicanism, the practice of renewing the baptismal promises is more or less widespread and often happens at one's First Holy Communion and Confirmation, as well as annually during the Easter Vigil. Additionally, Martin Luther, the father of the Lutheran churches, taught that "we are to daily renew our baptism" and as such, when believers rise in the morning, they should proclaim “I am baptized into Christ.” On New Year's Eve, congregations belonging to various Methodist connexions, such as the United Methodist Church, Free Methodist Church and Pilgrim Holiness Church, conduct a watchnight service in the form of the Covenant Renewal Service, so that Methodist believers can personally renew their covenant with God every year; this liturgy is traditionally preceded by prayer and fasting.
