= The United Methodist Book of Worship (1992) =

Liturgy of the United Methodist Church

- Publisher: United Methodist Publishing House
- Publication date: 1992
- ISBN: 978-0687035724

The United Methodist Book of Worship (1992) is the official liturgy of the United Methodist Church. It contains services for sacraments and rites of the church such as Holy Communion, Baptism, Confirmation, Marriage, Healing (anointing) Services, and Ordination. The Book of Worship also contains the daily office or "Praise and Prayer" services for Morning, Midday, Evening, and Night, as well as prayers, services, Scripture readings, and resources for various special days throughout the Christian year.

== See also ==
- The Sunday Service of the Methodists; With Other Occasional Services
- Book of Worship for Church and Home (1965)
- Covenant Renewal Service
- Articles of Religion (Methodist)
- Explanatory Notes Upon the New Testament
