= Vigil =

Period of wanted sleeplessness

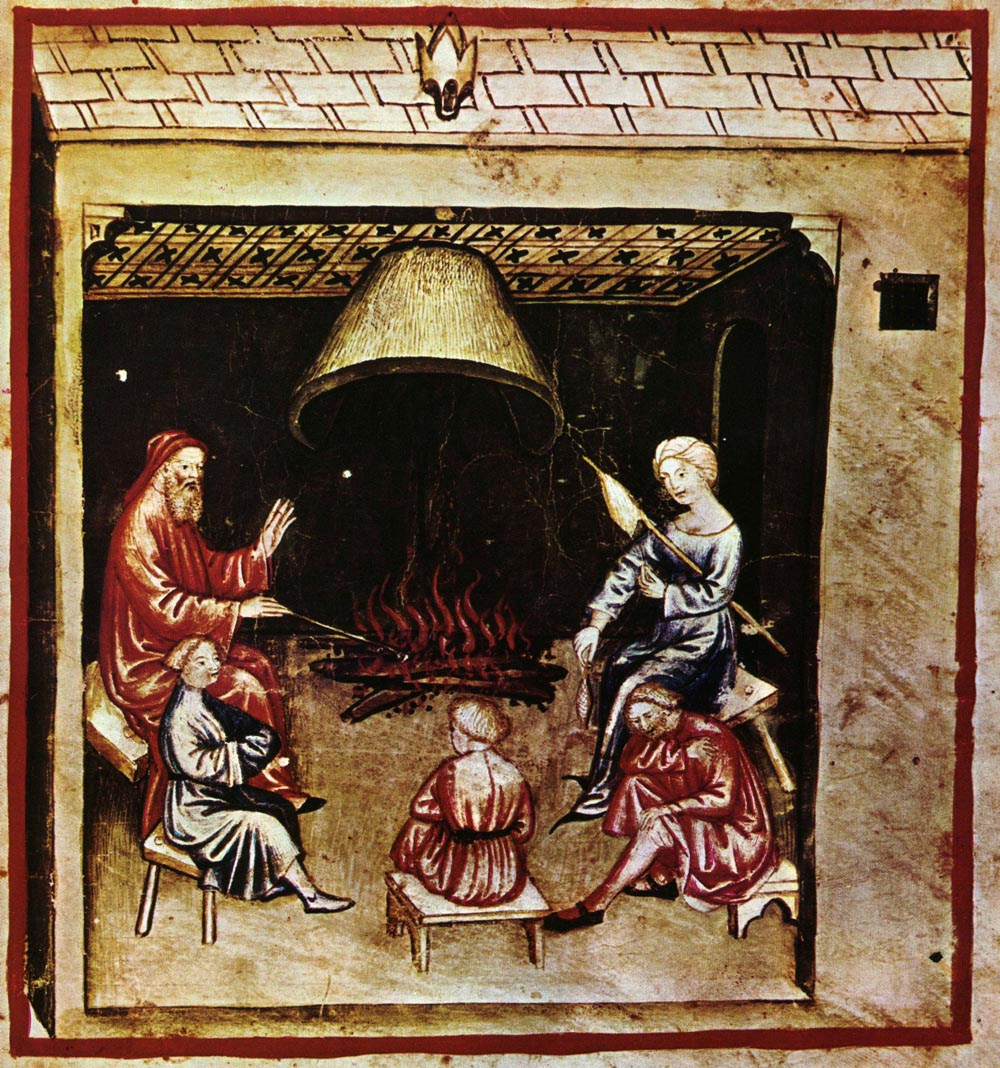
Vigil, tacuinum sanitatis casanatensis (14th century)

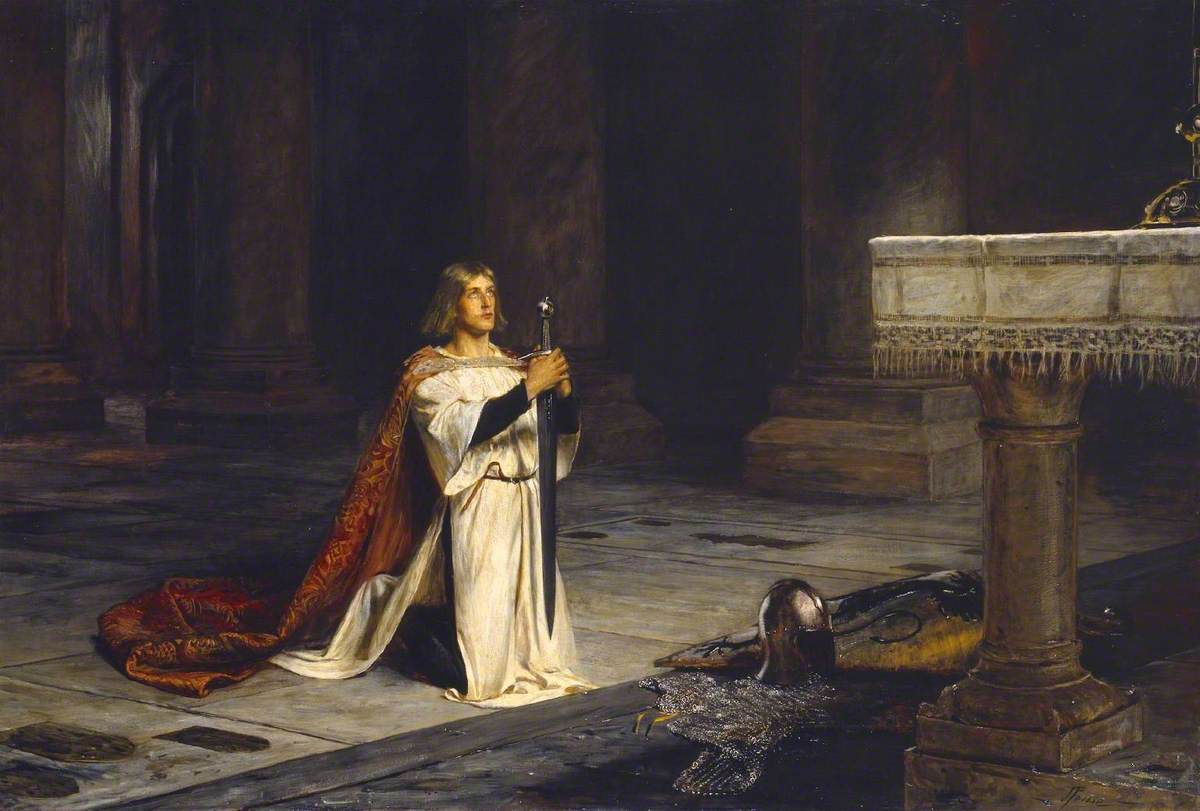
A Knight's Vigil by John Pettie

A vigil is a period of purposeful sleeplessness, an occasion for devotional watching, or an observance.

The word derives from the Latin vigilia meaning "wakefulness" (Greek: pannychis, παννυχίς or agrypnia ἀγρυπνία), and the Italian word vigilia has become generalized in this sense and means "eve" (as in "on the eve of the war").

== Eves of religious celebrations ==
A vigil may be held on the eve of a major religious festival (feast days), observed by remaining awake—"watchful"—as a devotional exercise or ritual observance on the eve of a holy day. Such liturgical vigils usually consist of psalms, prayers and hymns, possibly a sermon or readings from the Holy Fathers, and sometimes periods of silent meditation.

The term "morning" means that the observance begins on the evening before. In traditional Christianity, the celebration of liturgical feasts begins on the evening before the holy day because the Early Church continued the Jewish practice of beginning the day at sunset rather than midnight.

Most likely the best known vigil is the Easter Vigil held at night between Holy Saturday and Easter Sunday. The Midnight Mass held on Christmas Eve is a remnant of this practice. Christmas Eve is a time of reflection for Christians all over the world.

Vigils are also commonly observed on Holy Days in the Catholic, Lutheran, Anglican, and Methodist Churches. In the Eastern Orthodox Church an All-Night Vigil (consisting of Great Vespers, Matins and the First Hour) is held on the eves of Sundays and all Major Feast Days (such as the Twelve Great Feasts and the Feast Days of important Saints) during the liturgical year. In the Methodist tradition, Watchnight Vigil services are celebrated on New Year's Eve.

== Vigils at the time of death ==
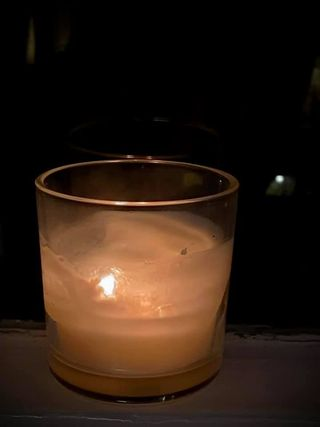
Vigil candle

When a Jew dies, a watch is kept over the body and Tehillim are recited constantly, until the burial service.

In Christianity, especially the Eastern Orthodox and Roman Catholic traditions, a vigil is often held when someone is gravely ill or mourning. Prayers are said and votives are often made. Vigils extend from eventual death to burial, ritualistically to pray for a loved one, but more so their body is never left alone.

== Medieval knights ==
During the Middle Ages, a squire on the night before his knighting ceremony was expected to take a cleansing bath, fast, make confession, and then hold an all-night vigil of prayer in the chapel, preparing himself in this manner for life as a knight.

== Modern mourning, remembrance and protest ==
In some countries, including the United States and Australia, vigils are held in public spaces as a form of peaceful protest or public mourning. Examples include the numerous public vigils during the protests against police violence and war as well as public vigils for victims of mass shootings, or as part of animal rights actions outside slaughterhouses or animal transport trucks, which can occur as a remembrance or commemoration of a death or traumatic event. These vigils typically begin with an announcement or speech, and can be silent or include chanting, song, or prayer. Public vigils in the most countries are not necessarily religious in scope or tone and are often completely secular, but can be religious depending on the group or individuals organizing the vigil.

== See also ==
- All-night vigil
- Candlelight vigil
- Christian burial
- Pannikhida
- Vigil (liturgy)
- Wake
