= Divergence between Anglicanism and Methodism =

The divergence between Anglicanism and Methodism distinguishes the doctrine, as well as the practices of Anglicans and Methodists. This divergence occurred early on, during the lifetime of John Wesley, who is regarded as the founder of the Wesleyan Methodist tradition. In the 1760s, Methodism and Evangelical Anglicanism took different trajectories, with differences becoming “distinctly apparent”. Calling it "the grand depositum" of the Methodist faith, Wesley specifically taught that the propagation of the doctrine of entire sanctification was the reason that God raised up the Methodists in the world.

Additionally, the Church of England was seen by Methodists as suffering from corruption and complacency. Revivalistic worship, as well as certain doctrines distinguish Wesleyan Methodism from Anglican doctrine, particularly the teaching of the New Birth (first work of grace), as well as the teaching of the second work of grace—entire sanctification—the eradication of original sin from the heart of a believer, who is then made perfect in love. In several ways, Methodism was influenced by Moravianism in "church organization, structure, worship and hymnody". Methodist worship, as well as the evangelism and missionary work of Methodist itinerant preachers John Wesley, George Whitefield and William Seward, included extemporaneous prayer and open-air preaching, which were disdained by Anglican clergy who resented and vehemently opposed the Evangelical Revival.

== Worship and evangelization ==
Early Methodists, in general, held a "distaste for the forms and trappings of Anglicanism". Anglican theologian Jennifer Woodruff Tait writes that "For Methodists, Wesley's critique of Anglican legalism, corruption, and complacency (of which there was plenty in the 18th century) culminates in the establishment of Methodism". This is reflected in the Historical Statement in The Book of Discipline of the Southern Congregational Methodist Church, which states:

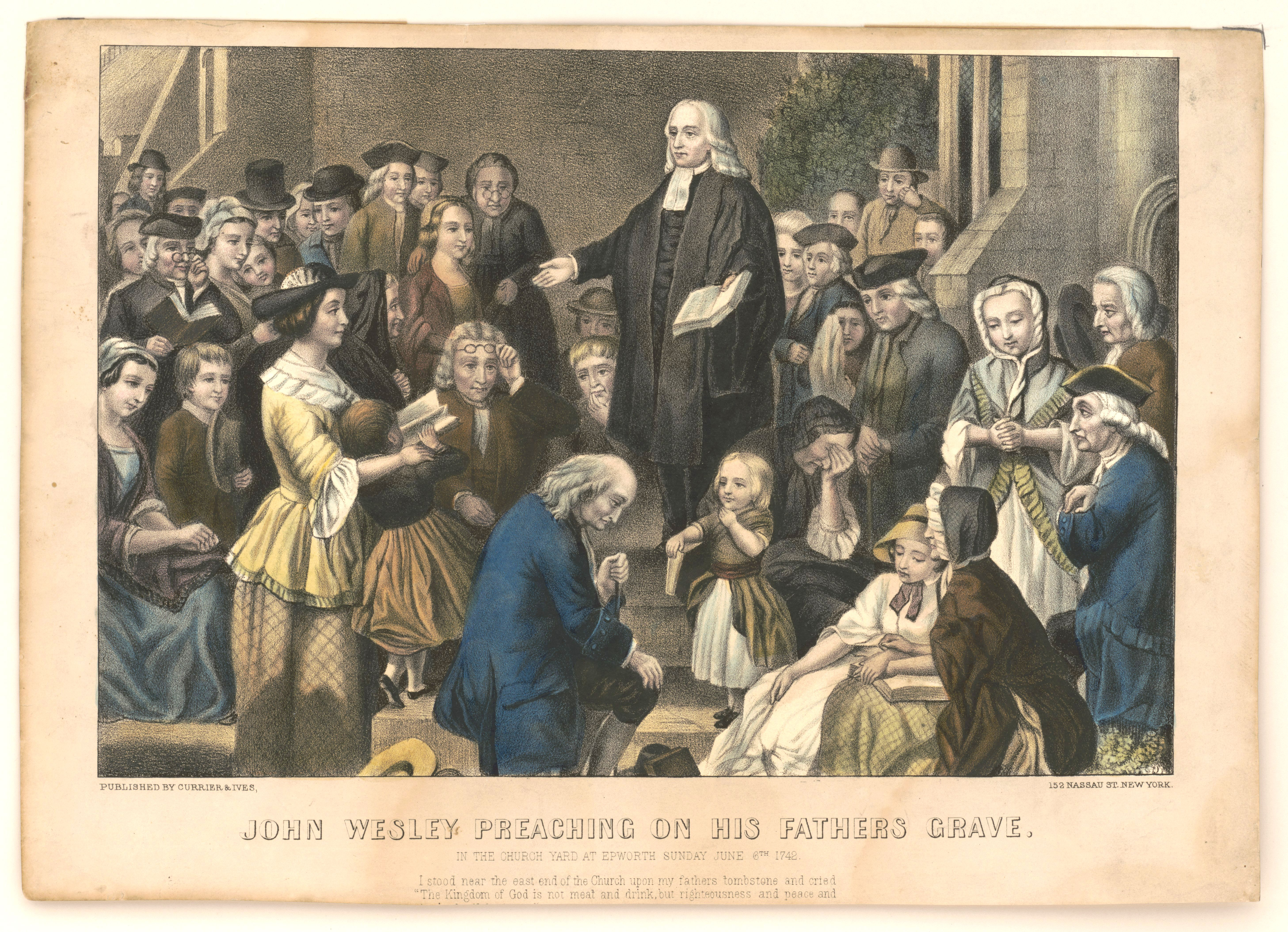
Open-air preaching typically employed by prominent Methodists, including John Wesley and George Whitefield; depicted is John Wesley preaching 6 June 1742.

God has always had a people — those who follow His teachings and are the salt of the earth. In the early years of the 18th century, the organized church had become ritualistic and filled with pomp and pageantry as the order of worship. The Anglican Church taught religion to be an intellectual and moral habit — without intervention of the Divine Being. In this setting, God's people were few in number. A practical religious movement based on the doctrine of a personal experience of salvation through faith was set in motion and shocked the formal churches of the 1700's. The name Methodist was one of the titles used to describe the participants in the new form of worship and because it continued to be an accurate description, Methodist was adopted as the official name.

The Sunday Service of the Methodists, the first liturgical texts of Methodism, is a revision of the Anglican Book of Common Prayer by John Wesley, who supplanted the word "bishop" with "superintendent", "removed the service for private baptism", and "removed words which seem to presume the inevitability of regeneration in baptism". Key to Methodist soteriology is the doctrine of the first work of grace—the New Birth—a personal conversion experience to faith in Jesus. Explicating Wesleyan Methodist theology, Dale M. Coulter states that "While prevenient grace [given in Holy Baptism] forms truth and goodness in human persons, it does not form Christ within them." He writes further that "In the new birth, the Spirit conceives Christ in the heart by reshaping the heart into the likeness of Christ." This personal experience of the new birth is a common doctrine among Evangelical traditions, such as Methodists and Baptists—who like Methodists, branched off of Anglicanism. Christian theologian Henry Bett deemed the changes reflected in The Sunday Service of the Methodists as theologically "very significant".

Ryan Nicholas Danker wrote that the early Methodists ignored "numerous boundaries in their drive to preach the New Birth", including those boundaries of "hierarchy, law, sex, age, wealth, education, and religious vocation." Methodists were accused by the Anglican mainstream of being "enthusiasts" and were seen as "disturbers of the world." Gerald Goodwin described the Church of England as being "the one major church hostile to the Great Awakening" which it saw as the manifestation of "preposterous enthusiasm". Street preaching was widely employed by Methodist preachers to call people to repentance, as well as to preach the New Birth and entire sanctification. On April 2, 1739, John Wesley wrote in his journal that he "submitted himself to be more vile and proclaimed in the highways the glad tidings of salvation, speaking from a little eminence in a ground adjoining to the city, to about three thousand people." Mobs, led by both Anglican clergy and laity, were violent towards the Methodists. On 24 August 1748, John Wesley was "attacked by a mob in a British town called Roughlee while preaching." William Seward, protégé of George Whitefield, was stoned to death by an angry mob in Caerleon, becoming the first Methodist martyr.

Anglican bishop Edmund Gibson dismissed the Journal of Calvinistic Methodist preacher George Whitefield as "tainted with enthusiasm" and "in August 1739 Gibson wrote his Pastoral Letter, cautioning the people in his diocese—which included the American colonies—against Whitefield's 'enthusiasm'."

No Anglican rector would allow Whitefield to preach in their churches in London, with the same being the case in the city of Bristol. Being barred from preaching in Anglican churches led George Whitefield to preach in the fields, where large crowds gathered to hear him.

The contentions aired by the Methodists against the established Anglican Church spared no one, including the clergy. While Wesley always maintained a reserved and diplomatic tone, others were not so reserved. Seward, for example, maintained that the “scarlet whore of Babylon” was not more corrupt in practice and principle than the Anglican clergy.

Subsequently Evangelical Anglicans, who often held to Reformed theology, distanced themselves from Methodists:

While sympathetic to the desire for "heart religion" that John preached, most Evangelicals desperately wanted to stay within the church, within which they were, in Ryan's words, an "embattled minority," They were gun-shy of associating with a movement criticized by Anglicanism's non-Evangelical members as politically seditious and religiously irresponsible. They viewed Methodism as dangerously close to the "conventicles" of an earlier era which had ultimately led to the overthrow of both state church and King; they distrusted John's use of lay preachers and the attempts of those lay preachers to administer Communion; and they resented Methodist preachers' disregard for parish boundaries by preaching to their flocks.

To discourage Methodist itinerant preachers from open-air preaching various measures were sometimes resorted to. Aside from rowdy and threatening mobs, typically incited by various members of the Anglican clergy, a drummer-boy would sometimes be instructed to stand along side the preacher, and beat his drum loudly, drowning out the words of the sermon. Both Whitefield and Harris had to endure this sort of treatment. Itinerant preachers were at times also confronted and sharply reprimanded for drawing away people, and any contributions they would otherwise offer to the Anglican Church.

Methodists, including leaders John Wesley and George Whitefield, employed extemporaneous prayer and Gibson labelled extemporaneous prayer "as a rejection of the 'Established Worship' outlined in the liturgy." In the present-day, Methodist worship includes extemporaneous prayer as normative, though it is not common in Anglican services. In general, Dissenters from the Church of England held that liturgical prayer was "performative, artificial, boring and repetitious, whereas free-form preayer was authentic and bespoke the heart's true desire." Methodism's first liturgical text The Sunday Service of the Methodists omitted "most of the holy days" that were present in the Anglican Book of Common Prayer as John Wesley saw them as "answering no valuable end."

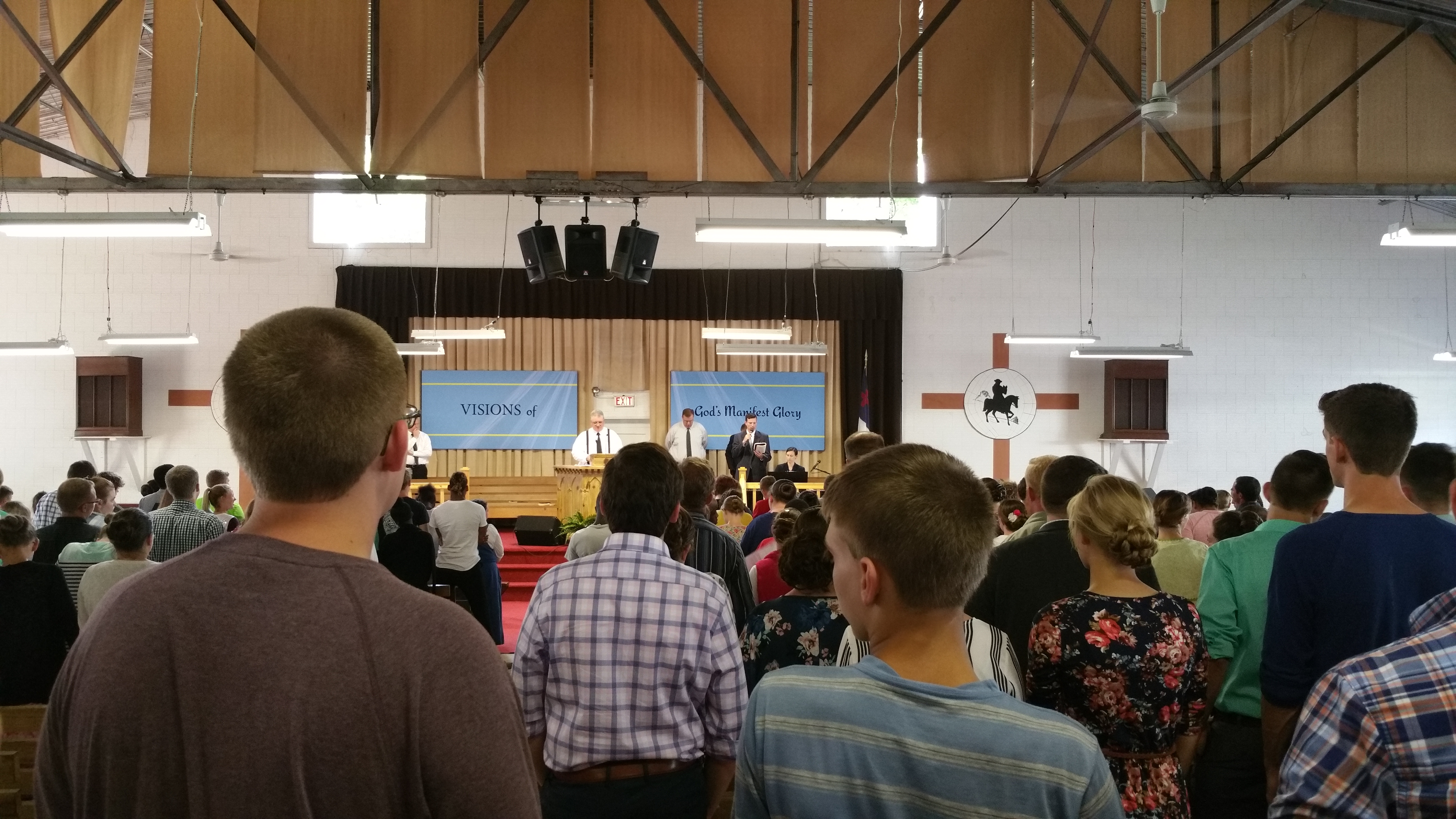
A service of worship during a camp meeting at the tabernacle of Methodist Campground in Stoneboro, Pennsylvania, owned by the Allegheny Wesleyan Methodist Connection. Camp meetings, usually held in the summer, are used by Methodists to preach the new birth and entire sanctification, as well as to call backsliders to repentance.

Methodism has incorporated particular distinctive worship practices, most of which are uncommon in Anglican praxis. The Oxford Handbook of Methodist Studies explicates this:

In 1768, six Methodist students were expelled from the University of Oxford, leading to further deterioration between Anglicans and Methodists. The Church of England came to refuse Holy Communion to known Methodists and in Great Britain, in the "1795 conference, the Methodist leaders decided to allow the administration of sacraments [in Methodist meetinghouses] if the majority of church officials consented."

The Anglican worship that Methodists shunned was a text-based liturgy. Sunday morning included three services from the Book of Common Prayer: Morning Prayer, the Litany, and ante-communion (i.e. the early parts of the communion service). It culminated with a sermon (Hatchett 1976: 369–85; Spinks 2006: 492–533). The result was a lengthy period filled with the reading of Psalms, other biblical texts, prayers, and other prescribed acts of worship, and punctuated with the occasional singing of metrical Psalms. Evening Prayer rounded out Sunday. The dominant architectural feature, a multi-decked pulpit, reinforced the text-centredness. The lowest part was a desk for a clerk, who led the congregation in their responses and singing. Behind and above was the reading desk for the minister. Here he read the services and the appointed Scripture lessons, using his Bible, Prayer Book, and metrical Psalter. Above that desk was the pulpit from which the sermon was read. Anglican worship thus consisted of a dialogue between these leaders and the congregation, each constituency reciting their parts. Anglican worship had to contend with the levelling dynamic of group reading. Anyone familiar with worship that involves extended reading by congregations soon realizes the measured monotone that corporate reading can produce. Variety in pace and tone are lost as the congregation finds its common reading voice. Where worshippers were illiterate (universal literacy had yet to come), parishioners would have known the service by heart; but equally the memorization would have restricted innovation and encouraged a monotonous style. … But Methodists preferred worship that left them breathless, overwhelmed by a sense of God's presence that was explosive (not just solid), Scripture-experiencing (not just infused with Scripture texts), and emotional (not just rational). …The foundation was the preaching service involving prayer, songs, Scripture, and sermon (and sometimes an exhortation), concluded by a closing prayer and song. The service was very flexible, allowing adaptation for indoors or outdoors and could be either spontaneous or scheduled (the original meaning for a preacher’s ‘appointment’). There were no prescribed texts to read.

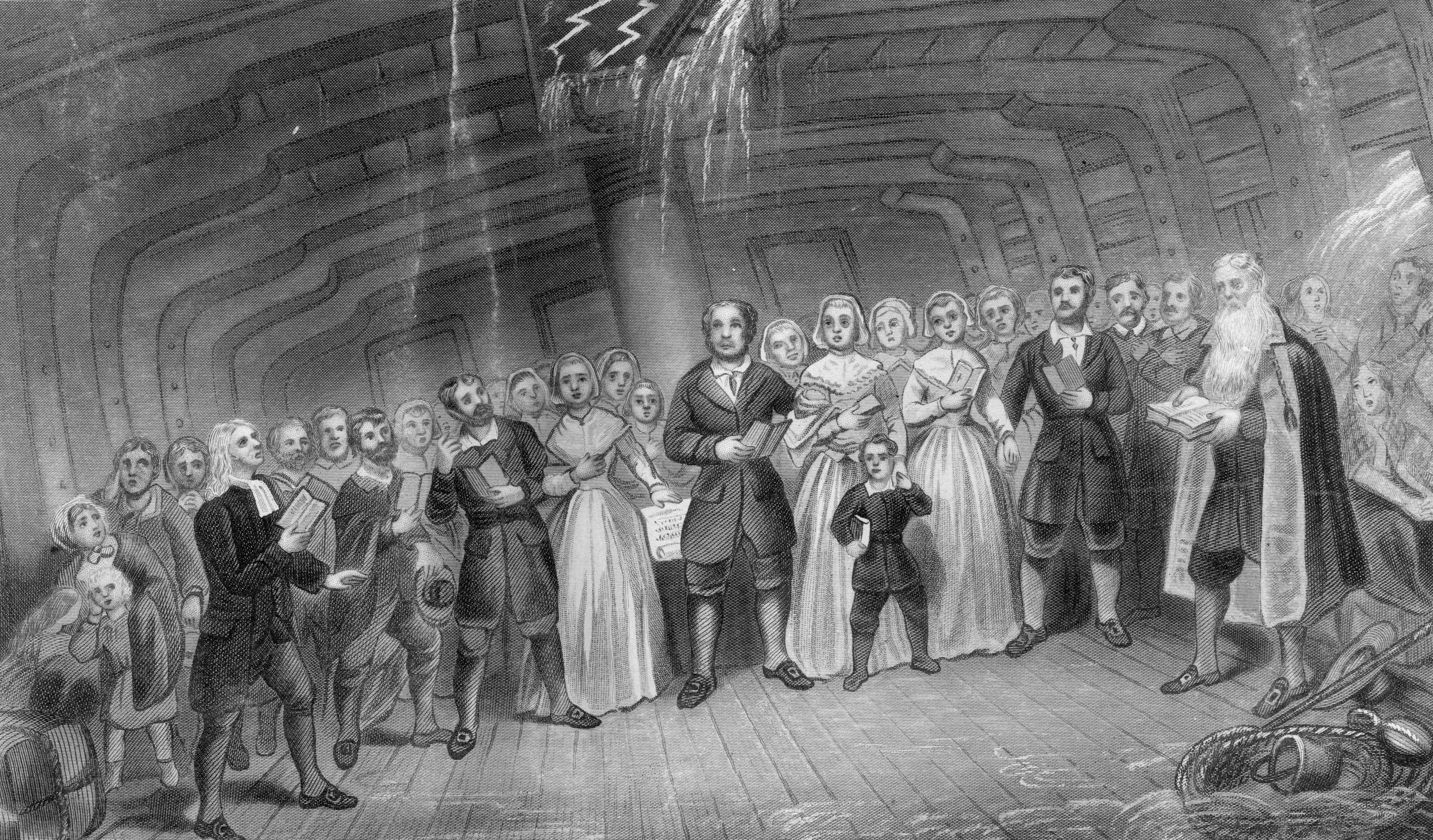
John Wesley on his way to America (1840), an engraving on paper depicting Wesley's journey with the Moravian Brethren to the New World. The father of Wesleyan Methodism, John Wesley, was heavily influenced by the piety of the Moravian Church and a number of Moravian practices were incorporated into Methodism, such as the lovefeast and New Year's Eve watchnight service.

Historically, Methodist churches have devoutly observed the Lord's Day (Sunday) with a morning service of worship, along with an evening service of worship (with the evening service being aimed at seekers and focusing on "singing, prayer, and preaching"); the holding of a midweek prayer meeting on Wednesday evenings has been customary. 18th-century Methodist church services were characterized by the following pattern: "preliminaries (e.g., singing, prayers, testimonies), to a 'message,' followed by an invitation to commitment", the latter of which took the form altar call—a practice that a remains "a vital part" of worship. A number of Methodist congregations devote a portion of their Sunday evening service and mid-week Wednesday evening prayer meeting to having congregants share their prayer requests, in addition to hearing personal testimonies about their faith and experiences in living the Christian life. After listening to various members of the congregation share their salvation testimonies, voice their prayer requests, and share their praise reports, congregants may kneel for intercessory prayer. Influenced by the practice of the Moravian Church—another part of the Evangelical Revival—Methodists adopted the observance of the lovefeast (with bread and water), which are typically held on a quarterly basis. In certain Methodist connexions, such as the Missionary Methodist Church and the New Congregational Methodist Church, feetwashing is practiced at the time that the Lord's Supper is celebrated. Foot-washing was once practiced in the Anglican Church but was entirely phased out by 1754. Modern Anglican/Episcopal provinces, however, have reintroduced foot washing for the liturgical observance of Maundy Thursday.

Following the lead of the Moravian Brethren, John Wesley, adopted watch night services in 1740, sometimes calling them Covenant Renewal Services. The services provided Methodist Christians with a godly alternative to the drunken revelry of New Year's Eve. A Methodist watchnight service includes singing, spontaneous prayers and testimonials, as well as scripture readings and Holy Communion. Methodist revival services and camp meetings have been characterized by groaning and shouting, as people sought the fullness of salvation that Methodists taught to be embodied by the experience of entire sanctification. To outsiders, Wesleyans were labeled as "Shouting Methodists" due to their free expression during worship. Revival services are often held for a week at least once a year in a number of Methodist churches.

Summarizing the worship of Methodists, in contrast to that of Anglicans, academics James E. Kirby and William J. Abraham state:

The difference between Anglican and Methodist worship went deeper than varying practices. The core character, what liturgical scholar James White has called the ‘central ethos’ (White 1989: 23) for each, was poles apart. Even though Methodism was a movement derived from Anglicanism, the character of its worship largely existed outside that root. Indeed, at many points, it was more similar to parallel heart-religion movements than it was to its Anglican origins. These parallel movements included Continental Pietists, some Baptists and Presbyterians, and even some Quakers. The defining principle for this alternative world was ‘experimental religion’ (to use the eighteenth-century phrase). The hallmark was an emphasis upon an inwardly perceived experiencing of God’s grace, especially as it dealt with salvation. This ethos defined the core character of Methodist worship and showed the points at which it differed from Anglicanism.

== Doctrines ==
The formularies of Anglicanism—including the Thirty-nine Articles of the Church of England, along with the The Books of Homilies—were drafted by Thomas Cramner, who held to Reformed (Calvinist) soteriology and sacramentology. The Thirty-Nine Articles were approved by the Continental Reformed Churches, and the view of the Lord's Supper explicated in them, was viewed as reflecting the theology of John Calvin. There was "emphatic official expression of the Church's Calvinist identity when James dispatched official delegates to attend the Reformed Synod of Dort in the Netherlands." Benjamin Jenks (1646-1724) held that Reformed doctrine was the "express doctrine of the Church of England" and insisted that since the Reformation, the majority of English clergy held to Reformed soteriology. Though early Anglicanism adhered to "a broad Calvinist or Reformed consensus", contenders for Arminian doctrine in the Church of England emerged in the 17th century. The Wesleyan-Arminian theology of Wesleyan Methodism differed from Classical Arminianism, however, by a "stronger Augustinian view on natural corruption; it lays greater stress of the subjective experience of conversion and regeneration; and adds a few additional doctrines, namely:"

1. The doctrine of the universality of divine grace not only in its intention, but in its actual offer. (This was derived from the Quaker doctrine of universal light.)

2. The doctrine of the witness of the Spirit or the assurance of salvation (Rom. 8:15, 16).

3. The doctrine of perfectionism (also borrowed from the Quakers, and based on such passages as Matt. 5:48; Phil. 3:15; Heb. 6:1; 10:4; 1 John 3:6; 5:18).

The Twenty-five Articles of Religion are the historic doctrinal statement of Wesleyan Methodism. John Wesley revised the Thirty-nine Articles of the Church of England, removing the Reformed (Calvinistic) parts among others, reflecting Wesleyan-Arminian theology. In particular, the article on original sin was truncated, in view of the core Wesleyan Methodist doctrine of entire sanctification. The Reformed theology of the real spiritual presence was retained by Methodists "and is well presented in the Holy Communion hymns of Charles Wesley."

Though adhering to a variant of Reformed (Calvinist) theology, unlike the historic Reformed Churches the Calvinistic Methodists teach the Methodist doctrine of the New Birth—a personal experience of salvation; their worship, as with that of Wesleyan Methodists, includes extemporaneous prayer and preaching, thus diverging from Anglicanism. Reformed Methodist leader George Whitefield experienced an evangelical conversion in 1735 and his sermon The Nature and Necessity of our New Birth in Christ Jesus in Order to Salvation (1737) was widely read.

== Outward holiness ==
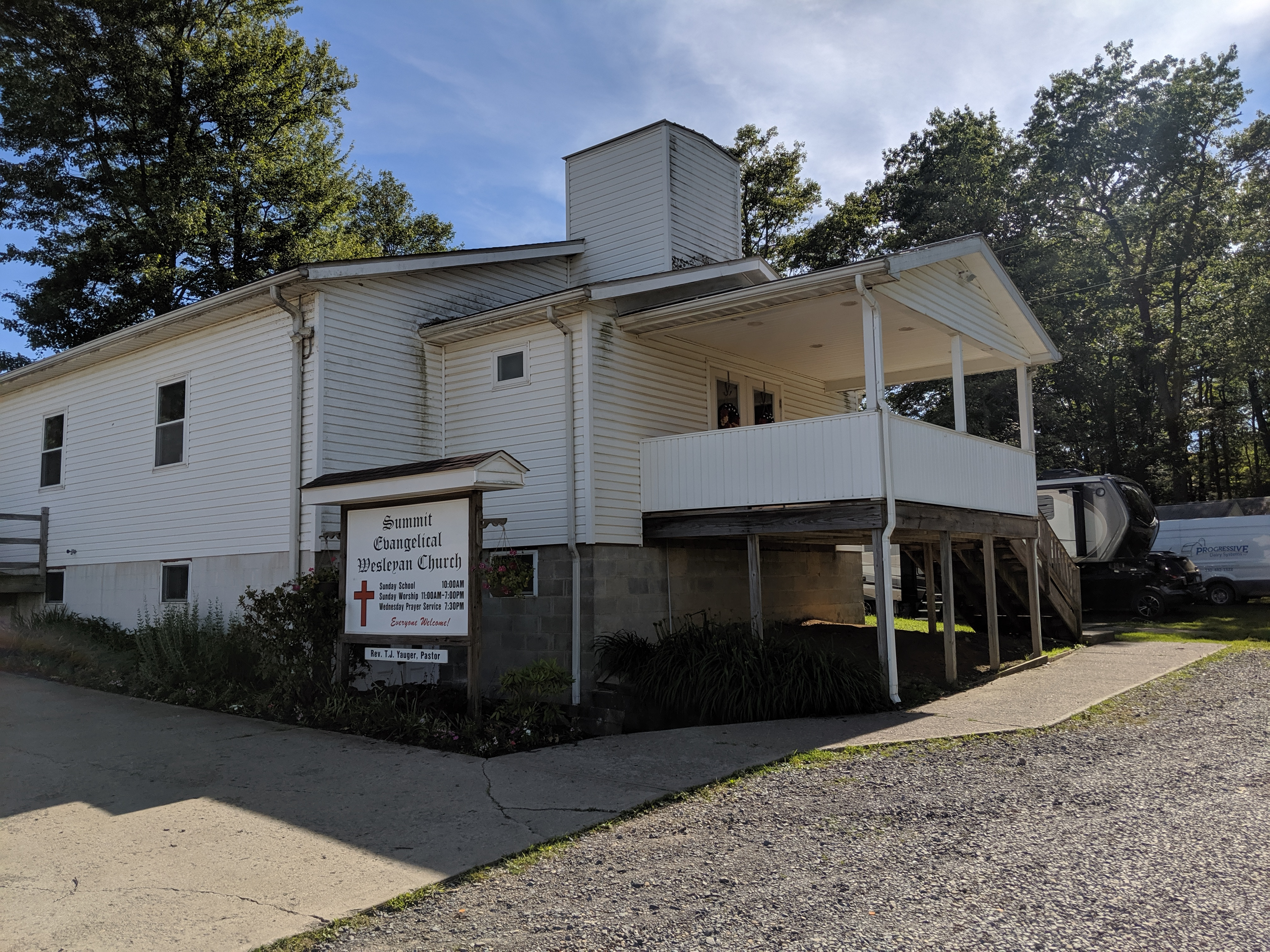
The signboard of an Evangelical Wesleyan church, indicating the timings for Sunday morning and Sunday evening worship, consistent with the historical First-day Sabbatarian practice of Methodism to keep holy the Lord's Day.

Early Methodism was criticized as being an evangelical "heart religion" that appealed to the labouring poor. Certain aspects of Methodism "deterred many social elites" as the "honour code with still informed eltie values sat awkwardly against Methodism's call to repentance and its emphasis on human guilt." Commensurate with the Methodist doctrine of outward holiness, early Methodists wore plain dress, with Methodist clergy condemning "high headdresses, ruffles, laces, gold, and 'costly apparel' in general". John Wesley recommended that Methodists annually read his thoughts On Dress; in that sermon, Wesley expressed his desire for Methodists: "Let me see, before I die, a Methodist congregation, full as plain dressed as a Quaker congregation." The 1858 Discipline of the Wesleyan Methodist Connection thus stated that "we would ... enjoin on all who fear God plain dress." Peter Cartwright, a Methodist revivalist, stated that in addition to wearing plain dress, the early Methodists distinguished themselves from other members of society by fasting once a week, abstaining from alcohol (teetotalism), and devoutly observing the Sabbath.

Over time, many of these practices were relaxed in mainline Methodism, although practices such as teetotalism and fasting are still encouraged, in addition to the current prohibition of gambling. Denominations of the conservative holiness movement, such as the Allegheny Wesleyan Methodist Connection and Evangelical Methodist Church Conference, continue to reflect the spirit of the historic Methodist practice of wearing plain dress, with members abstaining from the "wearing of apparel which does not modestly and properly clothe the person" and "refraining from the wearing of jewelry" and "superfluous ornaments (including the wedding ring)". The Fellowship of Independent Methodist Churches, which continues to observe the ordinance of women's headcovering during prayer and worship, stipulates "renouncing all vain pomp and glory" and "adorning oneself with modest attire."

== Ecclesiology and polity ==
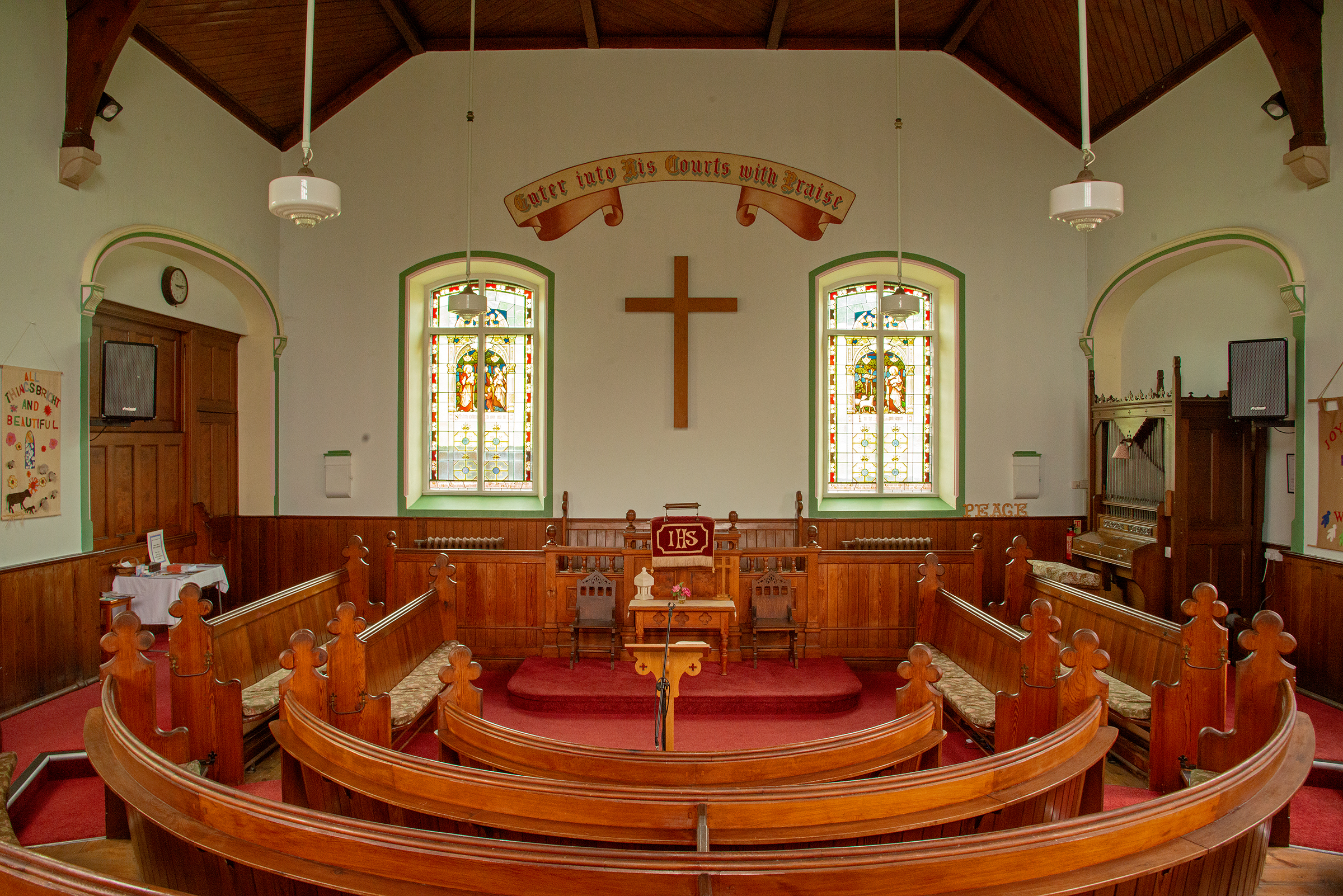
West Burton Methodist Church in West Burton, North Yorkshire, UK

Methodist theologian David N. Field, with regard to Methodist ecclesiology, writes:

While Wesley’s terminology varies, he understands the visible church as a community of people who have been transformed by the grace of God manifested in holiness of heart and life. It is the gathering of the scattered members of the invisible church in a particular location. This location can range from a relatively small community to a nation. Such a visible church is “a branch of the one, true, Church of Christ”. Holiness of heart and life and not institutional structures constitute the visibility of the church. Negatively, this means that institutional churches were mixed bodies made up of genuine believers, those who professed to believe and those who had “the form of godliness without the power.”

Methodism was influenced by Moravianism in the areas of "church organization, structure, worship and hymnody." Within the church:

John Wesley borrowed the idea of bands from the Moravians. A band, of five to ten people, was smaller than the more relaxed class meeting, and meant to be more intense. Men, women, the married and the single met in separate bands once a week, confessed their sins and prayed for one another.

Methodism employs various models of ecclesiastical polity, depending on the Methodist denomination. Connexionalism is the term used to describe how a number of Methodist denominations are organized.

In the Evangelical Wesleyan Church, Free Methodist Church and Global Methodist Church, a modified form of episcopal polity is used, though unlike major branches of Evangelical-Lutheranism and Anglicanism, Methodist denominations have not shared in the historic episcopate. In these Methodist denominations, the bishop "is an office within the presbyterate and not an order of ministry", in contrast to Anglicanism, which has a threefold ministry. John Wesley held that the offices of bishop and presbyter constituted one order; Methodism thus has two orders of ministry—the presbyterate and diaconate. Methodism's first liturgical text The Sunday Service of the Methodists substituted the word "priest" used in the Anglican Book of Common Prayer with "minister" or "elder", removing "any trace of sacerdotalism", with Wesley reflecting the views of evangelical Dissenters of his day.

A number of Wesleyan Methodist denominations have congregational polity, including the Congregational Methodist Church, the First Congregational Methodist Church, the Southern Congregational Methodist Church, and the New Congregational Methodist Church.

Other Wesleyan Methodist congregations are independent, though they typically associate with like-minded congregations and form groupings such as the Association of Independent Methodists and Fellowship of Independent Methodist Churches.

The Calvinistic Methodist Church, a Reformed Methodist denomination, has presbyterian polity.

== See also ==
- William Seward (preacher), Methodist martyr

== Bibliography ==
- Clarke, M. V. (2008). Spirituality and Practicality: John Wesley's visit to America and Moravian Influences on Methodist Music and Worship. Lumen, 27, 13–26..
- Dallimore, Arnold A. (1980). George Whitefield: The Life and Times of the Great Evangelist of the Eighteenth-Century Revival. Vol. II. Edinburgh or Carlisle: Banner of Truth Trust. ISBN 978-0-85151-300-3.
- Davies, Rupert E.; George, A. Raymond; Rupp, Gordon (2017). A History of the Methodist Church in Great Britain, Volume Three. Wipf & Stock Publishers. p. 225. ISBN 978-1532630507.
- Gibson, James. "Wesleyan Heritage Series: Entire Sanctification". South Georgia Confessing Association. Archived from the original on 29 May 2018.
- Frykholm, Amy (2020). "The strange, humbling ritual of foot washing". The Christian Century.
- Goodwin, Gerald L. (1966). "The Anglican Reaction to the Great Awakening". Historical Magazine of the Protestant Episcopal Church. 35 (4). Historical Society of the Episcopal Church: 343–371. JSTOR 42973163.
- Kelley, Charles (15 May 2018). Fuel the Fire: Lessons from the History of Southern Baptist Evangelism. B&H Publishing Group. ISBN 978-1-5359-0824-5. "George Whitefield was the early lightning rod of the revival. His dramatic, sensational preaching of the gospel and call for repentance attracted some of the largest crowds ever to hear a sermon in England. He was an itinerant minister and insisted on going to the places where the gospel was not being preached. The boldness earned him the wrath of the official clergy, and he was forbidden to preach in many pulpits. Rejection by the churches led Whitefield to start preaching in the fields."
- Melton, J. Gordon (1987). The Encyclopedia of American Religions. Gale Research Company. p. 275. ISBN 978-0-8103-2133-5.
- Discipline of the Missionary Methodist Church. Missionary Methodist Church. 2004. p. 7.
- Morgan, Edward (1852). The life and times of Howel Harris, Esq., the first itinerant preacher in Wales. London: Holywell.
- Tucker, Robert Leonard (1918). The Separation of the Methodists from the Church of England. The Methodist Book Concern. p. 49.
