= William Seward (preacher) =

Methodist preacher and martyr (1702 – 1740)

William Seward (3 January 1702 – 22 October 1740) was an English investment broker and an early supporter of the Methodist Church. Through his close association with George Whitefield, an itinerant preacher, and John Wesley, a principal founder of Methodism, Seward developed an aspiration to pursue a life of preaching.

Seward's faith deepened as he repeatedly witnessed Whitefield's dynamic preaching. Like Whitefield, Seward embraced Calvinistic Methodist theology, which, however, came to be a cause of contention with Wesley and his biblical views. As Whitefield's traveling companion, he voyaged from England to Savannah, Georgia, in 1739, providing him with substantial financial assistance for the voyage, establishing an orphanage in Savannah, and for his overall missionary efforts. Already familiar with employing the newspapers to promote his brokerage business, Seward often times employed them to promote Whitefield's scheduled sermons prior to his arrival in the various towns he visited, greatly increasing the number of people in attendance. As such, Whitefield owed much of his success in the colonies to Seward's earnest efforts. Upon his return to England from the British–American colonies, greatly inspired by Whitefield's preaching, which often attracted many thousands of listeners, Seward began to practice his own itinerant preaching in various Welsh towns; a missionary effort which came to an abrupt end when he was martyred by an incited angry mob. Seward's assistance to Whitefield's arduous efforts greatly helped him in spreading the gospel, and the evangelical movement throughout the British Empire and beyond. Moreover, Whitefield owed much of his success in the colonies to Seward's earnest efforts.

Because of his relatively short life and brief involvement with the young Methodist movement, Seward never achieved much notoriety until his untimely death when he became the first martyr of the Methodist faith.

== Early life and family ==
William Seward (Note: Because of his brief and often unnoticed involvement with the Methodists, there are no known images taken from his likeness when Seward was living) was born in Badsey, Worcestershire and was the brother of Thomas Seward, the widely noted Anglican clergyman, author and editor. William was the fourth of seven sons of John and Mary Seward, who moved to Badsey in the late 17th century. His wife, Grace, died in 1738, where he subsequently went through a religious transformation shortly thereafter. His brothers included Henry Seward, the eldest brother who inherited the family estate, Rev. Thomas Seward, an Anglican clergyman, author, and father of the poet Anna Seward, and Benjamin Seward, a graduate of Balliol College, Cambridge; a close friend of the Wesleys who converted to Methodism, to which Henry strongly objected. As a young man Seward moved to London where he established himself in business as a stock-broker.and earned himself a position as an official in the Treasury of the South Sea Company and in this capacity acquired considerable wealth. In spite of his wealth, however, he was a philanthropist with a reputation for his generosity for promoting charity schools for years and gave substantially to the Methodist Church as well as to charitable organizations who were sympathetic to the needs of the poor.

== Conversion and ministry ==
In 1738, William met Reverend Charles Wesley, brother of John Wesley and George Whitefield, the founder of Calvinistic Methodism; associations which led to his conversion to Christianity in 1739.. After listening to the sermons of the early Methodists preachers like Wesley and Whitefield, both central figures in the First Great Awakening, Seward was deeply inspired and professed his faith in Jesus Christ. In little time he became closely involved with the evangelistic campaigns of the early Methodists and decided to embark on a missionary career as an itinerant preacher, employing the same dynamic oratory methods used by Whitefield. (Note: For a chronology of Whitefield's Evangelical life from 1714 -1770, with that of Steward's, see, George Whitefield: wayfaring witness, Henry, 1957, pp. 200-210)

At that point in time the Methodists were met with much disdain from the clergy and various members of the Anglican Church, whom they referred to as "enthusiastic Methodists". The Anglican Church was opposed to the voluminous religious revival that was occurring during the Great Awakening, especially as it was re-invigorating the various churches that had already dissented from the established Church of England.

Of particular concern to the Church was that the Great Awakening knew no boundaries and had permeated all levels of society, urban and rural, rich and poor; and that a significant portion of the Anglican congregations themselves were not upper-class. One of the group, George Whitefield, wrote of their encounter in his diary in April 1739: I..."went to Badsey and preached in Mr Seward’s brother’s yard". Whitefield had preached at Badsey for three consecutive days, and on the third occasion it is said that he brought much of the congregation to tears. In his late twenties, Seward provided the St James's Church in Badsey with funding for its alter, pews, and provided the church with a beautiful clock, which remained in use until 1903.

While the Anglican clergy initially harbored feelings of indifference and disdain towards the Methodists, who indeed were once members of the Anglican Church themselves, (Note: Whitefield himself was ordained into the Anglican priesthood in 1739.) their feelings towards them did not take on hostile proportions until Whitefield and his unconventional and dynamic preaching style came upon the scene. Seward was regarded as someone who was following directly in Whitefield's footsteps, and as such aggravated those ill feelings.

The contentions aired by the Methodists against the established Anglican Church spared no one, including the clergy. While Wesley always maintained a reserved and diplomatic tone, others were not so reserved. Seward, for example, maintained that the “scarlet whore of Babylon” was not more corrupt in practice and principle than the Anglican clergy.

With the enthusiasm of a new convert, Seward made efforts to promote Whitefield's preaching through various newspapers, like the Daily Advertiser, to reach the general public. In this capacity Seward once referred to himself as "a Fool for Christ's sake". He was already familiar with such undertakings as he had previously used the same promotional strategy that made him a successful stock broker. Seward used the newspapers to give advance notice of Whitefield's arrival in the various towns that he visited. His first newspaper coverage presented Whitefield as a young gentleman of distinguished piety and lauded him for his efforts and commitment by announcing Whitefield's intentions of sailing to Savannah, Georgia, to preach the gospel and established the first orphanage in America, which he named Bethesda; (Note: 'Bethesda' translates to the "House of Mercy", taken from the Book of John in the New Testament, which describes Jesus' visit to the Pool of Bethesda in Jerusalem to heal a paralyzed man who had been suffering for 38 years.) coverage that greatly enhanced Whitefield's popularity. His public praise of Whitefield greatly increased the number of people that came to listen to his sermons, while compelling many of them to volunteer to help in his missionary efforts. In the process Seward garnered many generous contributions which Whitefield duly used to fund the voyage and maintain and provide for the orphanage.

=== Itinerant preacher ===
Whitefield's first voyage to the colonies brought him to Savannah in May, 1738 to execute his plan which he had resolved to do in accordance with the Trustees of the Colony of Georgia who had granted him five hundred acres of land some nine miles outside Savannah. In late 1738.Seward had converted through Charles Wesley—an event that Whitefield recorded in his Diary..

Seward first sailed to America on Whitefield's second voyage to help manage Whitefield's ministry, acting as his publicist, business coordinator, and fundraiser. Aboard the ship Elizabeth, (Note: Not to be confused with HMS Elizabeth (1706)) they departed Gravesend August 14, 1739, with over a thousand pounds sterling collected for the orphan house, arriving at Lewis Town on October 30. This was Seward's first voyage to America. From there they made their way to Philadelphia some 120 miles north by November 2.

Prior to their voyage to the American colonies Seward and Whitefield had secured the release of Joseph Periam, an inmate committed by his father to Bethlehem Hospital, an insane asylum, on the assumption that he was mad. In negotiating his release Seward acted as the chief speaker, and in doing so astounded the hospital committee when he began quoting fervently from the Bible where they began to assume that it was Seward who was just as mad Periam. However, they acquiesced and allowed his release on the condition that Whitefield and Seward bring him along on their upcoming voyage.

Use of a schooner was offered to them, but instead Seward bought the vessel outright and named it the Savannah, commissioning Captain Gladman to remain as the ship's captain. This allowed them to forego using the tedious roads over an eight-hundred mile journey, allowing them to travel more quickly between the various ports of the colonies on their way to Savannah. Once in Georgia, the young Periam performed well as the schoolmaster at Whitefield's orphan-house.

Arriving in Georgia, Seward donated ₤I00 to the orphanage that Whitefield had established in Savannah. He also provided relief for many of Savannah's poor families. The Seward family were early supporters of the Methodist Church of John Wesley. When Wesley set out for the American colonies, they offered to donate to his missionary effort, but Wesley graciously declined the offer.

Contemporaries of William Seward

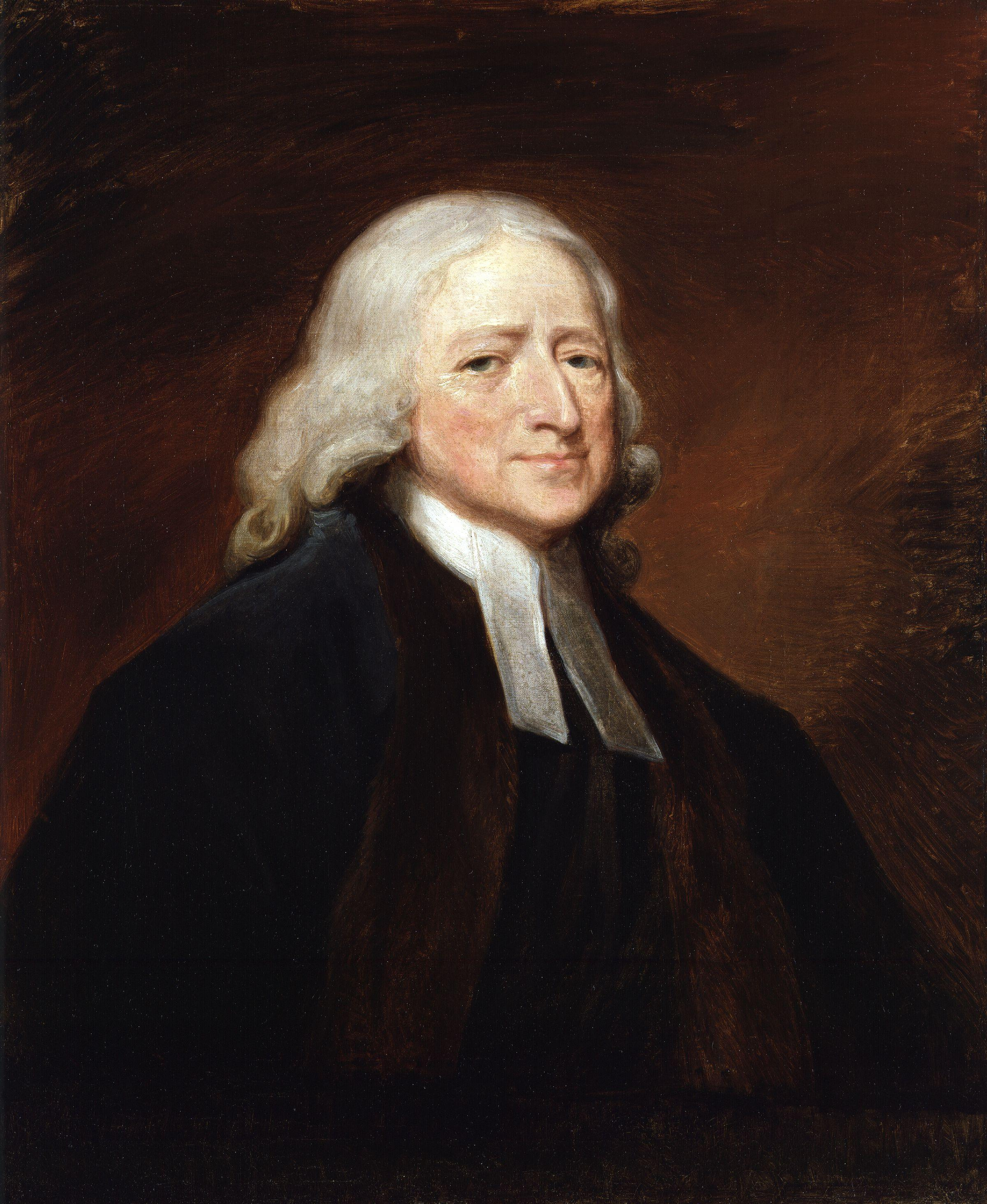
John Wesley

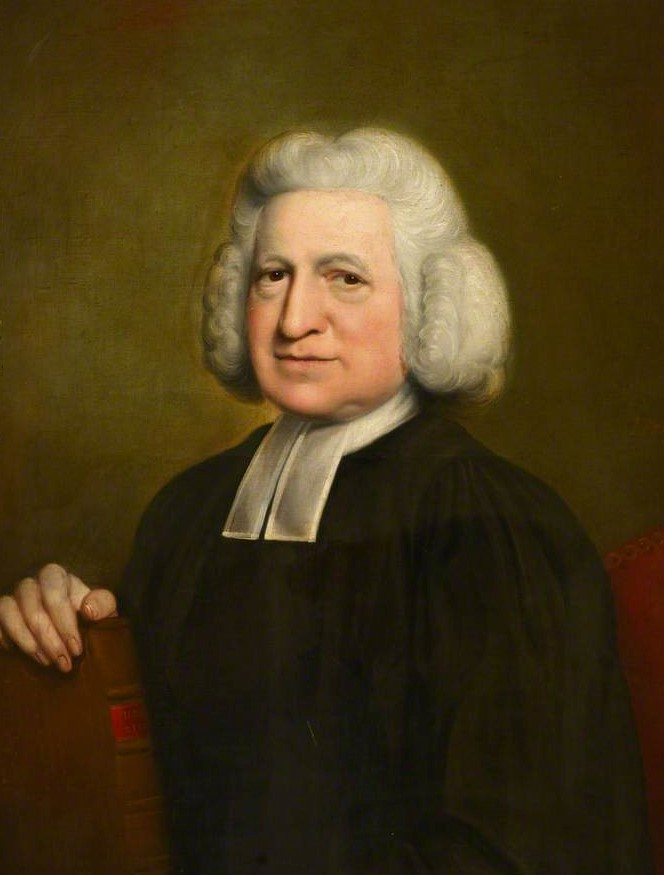
Charles Wesley

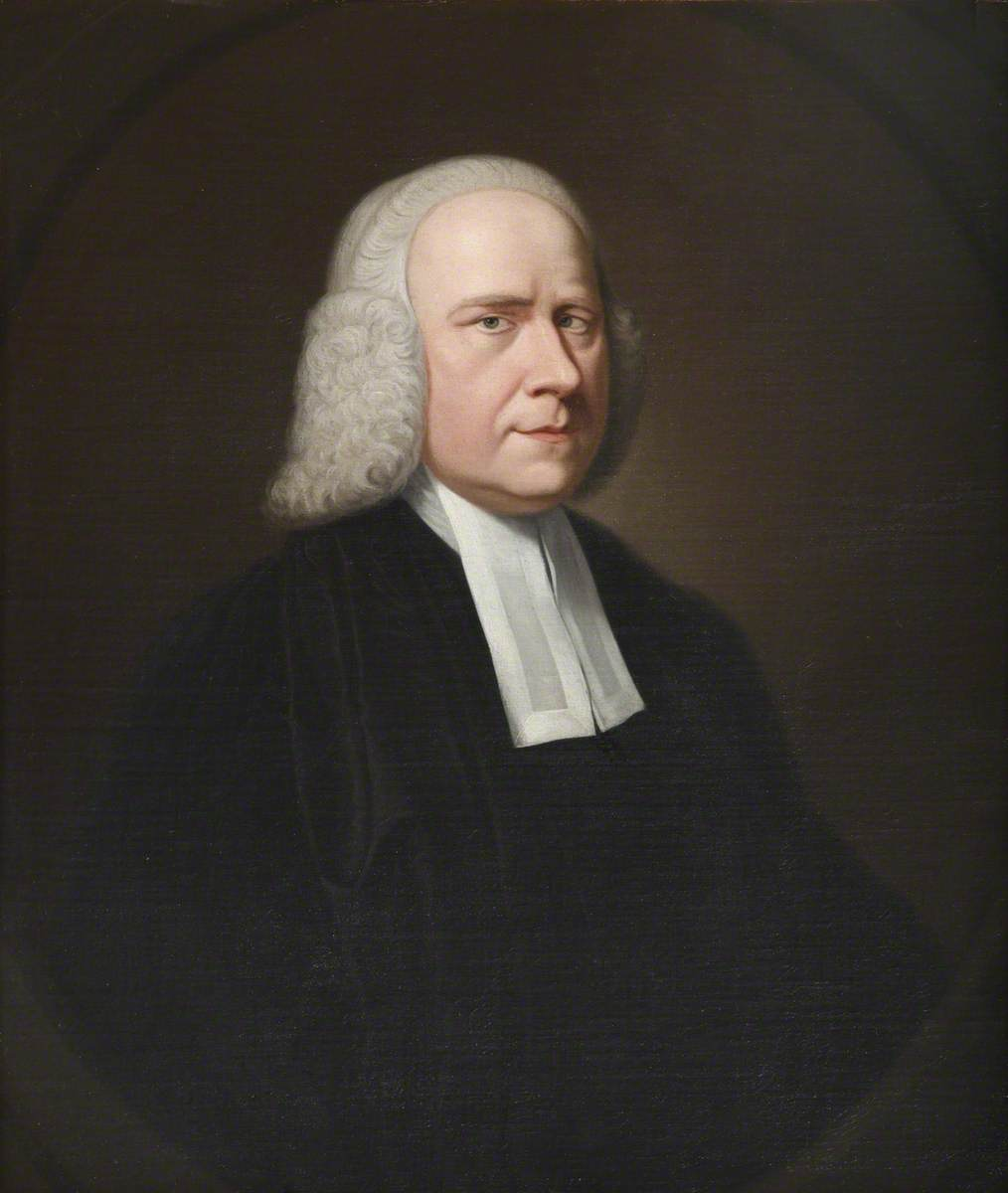
George Whitefield

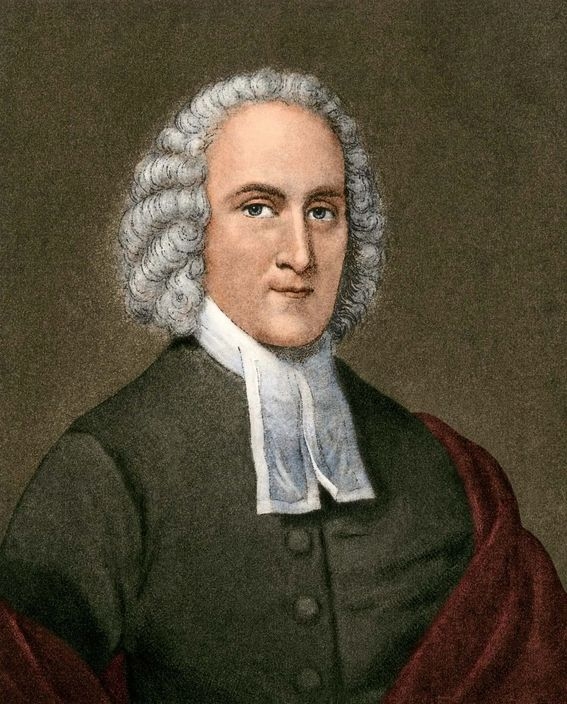
Jonathan Edwards

Because of his brief and often unnoticed involvement with Whitefield
there are no known images taken from Seward's likeness when he was living.

During his voyages from Savannah to Philadelphia, and from there to England, Seward kept a journal of the events and encounters he witnessed. Originally he had no intention of publishing the journal but was encouraged by a friend to do so after he had read it. Concerned that his account might not be in accord with the record kept by Whitefield in his journal, he submitted it to "three Gentleman" for review, which included Whitefield, who after reading it wholeheartedly recommended that Seward publish. Still concerned, however, about any discrepancies his journal might have with Whitefield's, he encouraged potential readers of his journal to first read Whitefield's account. In the Preface of his published journal Seward states:

The following JOURNAL was wrote without any Views of its present publication; but at my arrival I shew'd it to a particular friend, for his private information only, who, after he had read it, desired me by all Means to publish it. This I thought not suffucient, 'till I had submitted it to the Judgement of Persons of superior Parts and Learning; accordingly, it has pass'd the Examination of Three gentlemen, who are friends to the Cause of JESUS CHRIST, and of whose Judgement, Integrity, and Impartiality, I had no Reason to doubt . . .

— William Stewart

Inspired by the great success of Whitefield's open-air preaching, Seward in the same manner began preaching in the open-air. Seward's preaching compounded the concern among the Anglican clergy over Whitefield's open-air method of preaching. Whitefield had already challenged church authority the previous year when the Chancellor of the Diocese of Bristol had summoned him to answer for preaching without a proper license, where Whitefield defiantly maintained that he thought that regulation to be obsolete. (Note: The basis of Whitefield's contention was over the fact that the Chancellor had appealed to various obsolete canons of the Church, which he had not enforced on other visiting preachers.) This resulted in a serious conflict of interest with the Church of England whose clergy feared his unusual open-air style of preaching, like Wesley's, would disrupt the established social order and would threaten the authority of England's state church. John Wesley, had been ordained an Anglican priest in the Church of England, and when he began ignoring many church regulations concerning preaching outside prescribed parish boundaries and other regulations his preaching was seen as a threat to the authority of the Church of England.

As a result he was routinely attacked by Anglican Clergy in sermons and in print, and at times mobs harassed and sometimes violently attacked him. Seward's arrival as an itinerant preacher was seen in the same light and accordingly invoked the same hostile feelings.

In 1740 a rift occurred between two leading figures involved in the Great Awakening; John Wesley and George Whitefield. Though they shared a common passion for revival, field preaching, and justification by faith, they diverged on a critical theological fault line: Predestination. As Seward was a fervent supporter of Whitefield and Calvinistic Methodism he published highly controversial ideas about the Wesley's in his published Journal of a voyage from Savannah… to England, accusing the Wesleys of propagating "Popish, Damnable & Heretical" doctrine. At that point Seward believed that the Wesleys were deliberately undermining and supplanting Whitefield and himself.

Seward adhered to Whitefield's belief regarding Calvinism as opposed to Wesleyan theology, which differ primarily in how the theologies interpret God's sovereignty versus human free will, specifically regarding predestination, the extent of Christ's atonement, and the security of salvation. Calvinism taught that God chose specific individuals for salvation before creation, while Wesleyan theology taught that God offers grace and salvation to all people, which allowed all humans to choose whether to accept Christ or not. Their contrasting beliefs in that regard would prove to be a source of ambivalence and contention between Wesley with Seward and Whitefield.

Whitefield's great orational influence and open-air preaching attracted many new people to the Methodist congregations in Bristol. Before long Wesley, somewhat reluctantly, also began preaching in the same manner. As Wesley's congregation quickly increased in number he found himself in need of a much larger facility in which to comfortably accommodate sizeable gatherings.With Seward's substantial financial assistance, Wesley acquired and took possession of a piece of land in central Bristol, near St. James' churchyard. Here a large structure, referred to as the "New Room", (Note: The New Room, still stands in Bristol as the oldest Methodist building in the world.) was constructed. Upon completion Whitefield felt it more appropriate that the title of the New Room be in Wesley's name. The New Room was used to hold religious services and used as a meeting house for the various church groups in the greater Bristol area. Wesley insisted, however, that any services or meetings should only occur outside scheduled service hours and not conflict with other interests of the Anglican Church, as it was his original wish that Methodism complement rather than compete with Anglican worship.

Seward and Whitefield returned to the colonies in America, during which time Wesley began using the New Room to preach against the idea of Predestination. Not long after Seward's return to England he and Whitefield had strong differences of opinion over Wesley's ideas of Predestination and his use of the New Room to preach about such theology. The extended contest between Whitefield and Wesley raised serious questions concerning the ownership and use of the New Room, especially since Seward, with appreciable help from Whitefield's solicitations, had donated most of the funding. The Wesleyan Methodists soon gained the upper hand in the debate and subsequently secured the New Room for their own purposes, continuing to preach against the idea of predestination. From that point on Whitefield and Seward held their services at different locations than that of Wesley

Seward's brother Henry of the Anglican Church also had an unfriendly confrontation with Charles Wesley when he accused him of being a "rogue, rascal, villain, and pickpocket". This set the stage for William three months later when Seward met Wesley at Bristol in September. (Note: Seward's diary is filled with accounts involving the contentions he had with Wesleyan theology.) Upon his arrival to Bristol, he renounced the friendship of John Wesley and his brother Charles. William had met with some Baptists who besmirched the Wesleys, and subsequently, as entered in Charles' diary, September 23, 1740, he "utterly renounced both me and my brother, in bitter words of hatred, which they had put into his mouth." Seward indeed had referred to the Wesley's as. ". . .Judas's False Prophets, Wolves in Sheeps Clothing. . ." Immediately after their painful interview in Bristol, Seward proceeded to Wales, where he joined Howell Harris, a Calvinist preacher.

=== Martyrdom ===
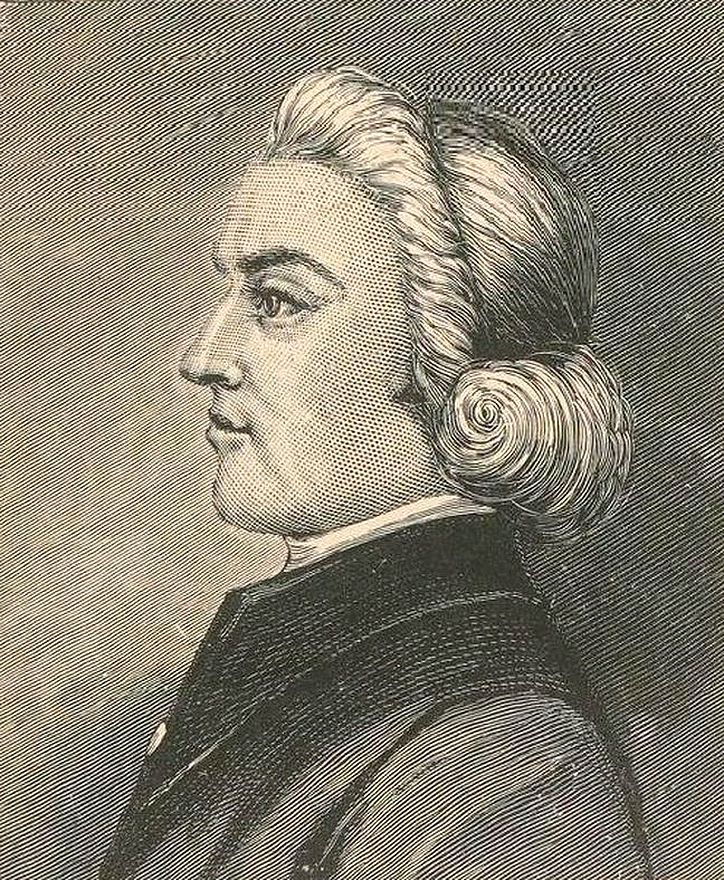
Howell Harris

In the fall of 1740 Whitefield directed Seward to return to England to procure badly needed additional funding for the orphanage, to find someone to take charge of it when he was absent, and to update the Trustees of Georgia with the state of the colony. Upon his arrival, Seward met with Howell Harris, at Cowbridge, who was also a former member of the Church of England, and colleague of Whitefield. Together they traveled and preached in the open-air in the Welsh towns of Newport, Caerleon, Usk, and Monmouth. When they arrived at Monmouth they continued to endure the same hostile treatment they had received at Newport and Caerleon. At Newport they were confronted by another mob, incited by parish priests and local magistrate, furious over their Methodist preaching. They tore off one of the sleeves of Seward's coat and pelted them with stones and other handy objects. At Caerleon, Seward encountered the same treatment, this time receiving a serious blow to his right eye, causing the loss of sight in that eye for a time. For a few days his injury partially impaired his other eye, where he had to be led about by the hand.

Having already been seriously injured at the hands of an angry mob, Seward, while fearful that he might again be attacked, remained calm, and uttered to Harris, "Better endure this than hell." Undaunted, Seward was determined to continue in spreading the Gospel, and was again stoned by an angry mob while preaching at Hay-on-Wye in October. This time, however, he received a serious blow to his head by a large stone. Laying unconscious, he was carried off. After a few days of lingering between life and death, Seward, at the age of thirty-eight, died from his injuries on October 22, 1740, thereby making him the first Methodist martyr. When Charles Wesley learned of Seward's death, in spite of their recent confrontation, he revealed a measure of forgiveness when, he entered in his diary, "1740, October 28,. I was exceedingly shocked with the news of Mr.Seward's death; but he is taken from the evil; rescued out of the hands of wicked men."

Whitefield biographer James Gledstone maintained that because of Seward's untimely death, many details of his associations and involvement in Georgia were never recorded by Seward. Whitefield was not aware of Seward's premature demise and as such that he could no longer accommodate Whitefield in the heavy debt he had acquired trying to maintain his orphanage in Savannah. Because of his relatively young age and unexpected death, Seward never thought to make out a last will. Seward had contracted other debts in the name of the orphanage, for which Whitefield was subsequently responsible. However, he eventually resolved the massive debts that hung over his head for most of his life, through appeals for money at the end of his sermons, though the debts were not fully paid until very late in his life.

Before Seward passed away he begged of his friends not to retaliate against his assailants. Seward's grave is located on the south-east side of St Mary's Church in the village of Cusop next to the town of Hay-on-Wye in Wales where he was martyred. A memorial plaque in Seward's honor is fixed on wall of the nave within the Church.

== See also ==
- History of Methodism in the United States
- Calvinistic Methodist
- Covenant theology
- Christian History Institute
- Selina Hastings, Countess of Huntingdon — Good friend of Seward and inluential member and supporter of the Methodist Church.
- Divergence between Anglicanism and Methodism

== Bibliography ==
- Barr, Josiah Henry (1916). Early Methodists under persecution. New York: Methodist book concern.
- Billingsley, Amos Stevens (1878). The life of the great preacher, Reverend George Whitefield, "The prince of pulpit orators". Philadelphia: P. W. Ziegler & Co.
- Dallimore, Arnold (1970). George Whitefield : the life and times of the great evangelist of the eighteenth-century revival. London: Banner odf Truth Trust. ISBN 978-0-8515-1300-3.
- —— (1980). George Whitefield: The Life and Times of the Great Evangelist of the Eighteenth-Century Revival. Vol. II. Edinburgh or Carlisle: Banner of Truth Trust. ISBN 978-0-85151-300-3.
- Gatiss, Lee (2014). "George Whitefield—The Anglican Evangelist" (PDF). The Southern Baptist Journal of Theology Archives. 18 (2).
- Gaustad, Edwin Scott (1957). The Great Awakening in New England. New York: Harper & Brother.
- Gledstone, James Paterson (1871). The life and Travels of George Whitefield. London: Longmans, Green, and Co.
- Goodwin, Gerald J. (1966). "The Anglican Reaction to the Great Awakening". Historical Magazine of the Protestant Episcopal Church. 35 (4). Historical Society of the Episcopal Church: 343–371. JSTOR 42973163.
- Gordon, Alexander, Reverend (1908). Whitefield, George. Vol. XXI. London: Dictionary of National Biography, Smith Elder & Co.
- Henry, Stuart C. (1957). George Whitefield: wayfaring witness. New York: Abingdon Press.'
- Hughes, Hugh J. (1892) [1791]. Life of Howell Harris. London: William Jones, Publishers.
- Kenny, William Howland (January 1969). "George Whitefield, Dissenter Priest of the Great Awakening, 1739-1741". The William and Mary Quarterly. 26 (1): 75–93. doi:10.2307/1922294. JSTOR 1922294.
- Lambert, Frank (2003). Pedlar in divinity : George Whitefield and the transatlantic revivals, 1737-1770. Princeton, N.J.: Princeton University Press. ISBN 978-0-6910-9616-2.
- Lane, Mark H. (2015). "John Wesley Receives the Holy Spirit at Aldersgate" (PDF). Bible Numbers for Life.
- Mahaffey, Jerome Dean (2007). Preaching politics : the religious rhetoric of George Whitefield and the founding of a new nation. Baylor University Press. ISBN 978-1-9327-9288-1.
- —— (2011). The accidental revolutionary : George Whitefield and the creation of America. Waco, Texas: Baylor University Press. ISBN 978-1-6025-8713-7.
- Morgan, Edward (1852). The life and times of Howel Harris, Esq., the first itinerant preacher in Wales. Holywell : Morris.
- Morgan, Kenneth (1990). John Wesley and Bristol. Bristol Historical Association. ISBN 978-0-9013-8858-2.
- Noll, Mark A. (2003). The rise of evangelicalism : the age of Edwards, Whitefield, and the Wesleys. Downers Grove, Ill: InterVarsity Press. ISBN 978-0-8308-3891-2.
- Philip, Robert (1838). The life and times of the Reverend George Whitefield. London: George Virtue.
- Ryle, John C. , Bishop (1869). George Whitefield: His Life and Times. Pensacola, Florida: Chapel Library. "This booklet is taken from the first three chapters in J. C. Ryle's The Christian Leaders of the Last Century."
- Seward, William (1740). Journal of a voyage from Savannah to Philadelphia, and from Philadelphia to England (PDF). London: Quinta Press.
- Sparrow, Terry (2002). SEWARD, William (1702-1740) - Methodist Martyr. Badsey Society.
- Graham C. G., Thomas (1990). "George Whitefield and friends : the correspondence of some early Methodists". National Library of Wales Journal. 26 (3): 263. Archived from the original on 12 August 2014.
- Tucker, Robert Leonard (1918). The Separation of the Methodists from the Church of England. The Methodist Book Concern. p. 49.
- Tyerman, Luke (1876). The life of George Whitefield. Vol. I. London: Hodder and Stoughton, Publishers.
- "William Seward, 1702-1740". Christ Methodist Church.
- "Seward family, of Badsey, near Evesham". Dictionary of Methodism in Britain and Ireland.
- Whitefield, George (1986) [1738-1741]. George Whitefield's journals. Edinburgh: Banner of Truth Trust. ISBN 978-0-8515-1482-6.
- Whitefield, George (1834). Gillies, John (ed.). Memoirs of Rev. George Whitefield. Whitmore & Buckingham and H. Mansfield.
- White, George, Reverend (1855). Historical collections of Georgia. New York: Pudney & Russell. — contains extensive coverage of Whitefield in Georgia

=== Further reading ===
- Pollock, John (1972). George Whitefield and the great awakening. England: Lion Publishing PLC. ISBN 978-0-8564-8273-1.
- Stevens, Abel (1859). The history of the religious movement of the eighteenth century called Methodism. Vol. I. New York: Carlton & Porter.
- —— (1859). The history of the religious movement of the eighteenth century called Methodism. Vol. II. New York: Carlton & Porter.
- —— (1859). The history of the religious movement of the eighteenth century called Methodism. Vol. III. New York: Carlton & Porter.
- von Wahlde, Urban C. (January 2009). "The Pool(S) of Bethesda and the Healing in John 5: A Reappraisal of Research and of the Johannine Text". Revue Biblique. 116 (1): 11–136. JSTOR 44090924.
- "William Seward's Diary". Chetham's Library. – (Hand written manuscript)
- Whitefield, George (1743). A journal of a voyage from London to Savannah in Georgia : in two parts. Part I. From London to Gibraltar. Part II. From Gibraltar to Savannah. London: Printed by W. Strahan for the Author.
