= Vigil (liturgy) =

Night prayer service

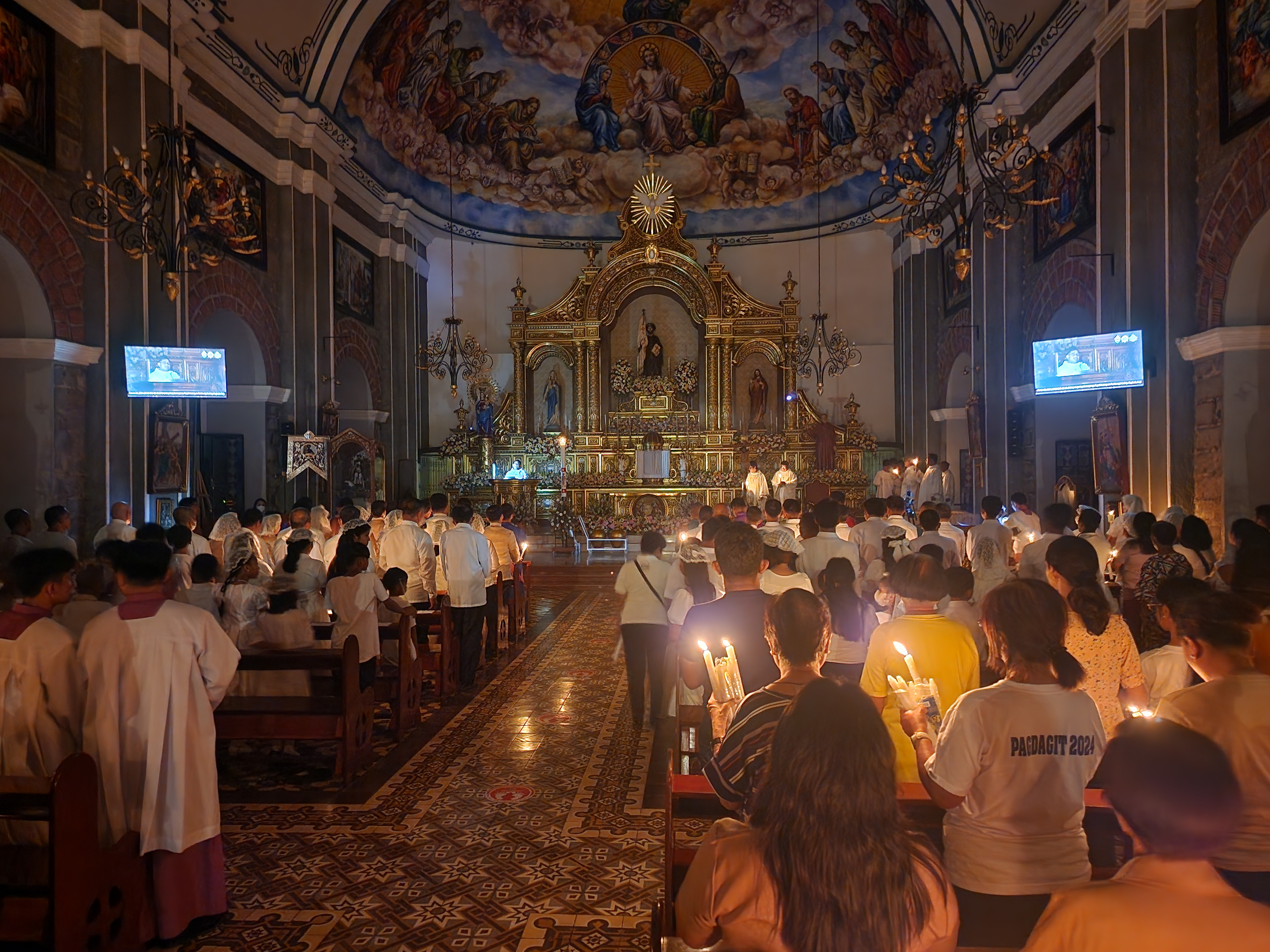
Easter Vigil at the Roman Catholic Shrine of St. James the Greater, Ibaan, Batangas, Philippines

In Christian liturgy, a vigil is, in origin, a religious service held during the night leading to a Sunday or other feastday. The Latin term vigilia, from which the word is derived meant a watch night, not necessarily in a military context, and generally reckoned as a fourth part of the night from sunset to sunrise. The four watches or vigils were of varying length in line with the seasonal variation of the length of the night.

== Etymology ==
The English term "wake", which later became linked to a gathering before a funeral, also denoted originally such a prayer service, and the term "vigil" is even now also used for a funeral service of that kind.

== History ==
=== Early Christianity ===
The practice of rising for prayer in the middle of the night is "as old as the church herself". It may be inspired by Jesus Christ's example of praying all night. There is evidence of the practice from the first years of the second century. Pliny the Younger reported in about 112 that Christians gathered on a certain day before light, sang hymns to Christ as to a god and shared a meal.

Tertullian (c. 155 – c. 240) speaks of the "nocturnal convocations" (nocturnae convocationes) of Christians and their "absence all the night long at the paschal solemnities" (sollemnibus Paschae abnoctantes) Cyprian (c. 200 – 258) also speaks of praying at night, but not of doing so as a group: "Let there be no failure of prayers in the hours of night — no idle and reckless waste of the occasions of prayer" (nulla sint horis nocturnis precum damna, nulla orationum pigra et ignava dispendia). The Apostolic Tradition speaks of prayer at midnight and again at cockcrow, but seemingly as private, not communal, prayer. The Peregrinatio Aetheriae describes the solemn celebration of vigils in the churches of Jerusalem in the early 380s.

During the 3rd century and 4th century, in addition to the celebration of Mass, it was customary to hold a vigil, a prayer service in three parts, as night-watches in preparation for the feast. Commenced in the evening, a vigil terminated only the following morning. Its liturgical was elastic, involving readings, singing of psalms, homilies, chants, and various prayers, followed by the Eucharistic service. These developed into the monastic celebrations, still called "vigils" in the Rule of Saint Benedict of the canonical hour that was later given the name of matins.

=== From 11th to 20th century ===
In the Middle Ages, entertainments such as dramatic representations of the saint or the event celebrated were added to vigils, but these were open to abuse. A synod held at Rouen in 1231 forbade the holding of "vigils" in church except on the patronal saint's feast alone and totally excluded the holding of dances in church or churchyard. The liturgical celebration was moved to the morning hours and thus disassociated from the secular festivities, with the result that the word "vigil" took on the meaning of "the day before a feast", and the self-denial of the nighttime celebration was replaced by fasting on that preceding day.

Even after the Protestant Reformation, the practice of fasting Vigils was maintained in the Church of England, whose Book of Common Prayer continued to indicate "Evens or Vigils" before 16 annual feasts, noting: "If any of these Feast-Days fall upon a Monday, then the Vigil or Fast-Day shall be kept upon the Saturday, and not upon the Sunday next before it." The 16 feasts were Christmas Day, Purification of the Blessed Virgin Mary, Annunciation of the Blessed Virgin Mary, Easter Day, Ascension Day, Pentecost, Saint John the Baptist, All Saints, and these eight of the feasts of the Apostles: Ss. Andrew (30 November), Thomas (21 December), Matthias (24 February), Peter and Paul (29 June), James the Greater (25 July), Bartholomew (24 August), Matthew (21 September), and Simon and Jude (28 October).

The List of Vigils in the Book of Common Prayer differs from that of the Tridentine calendar: the primary difference is that the Book of Common Prayer, instead of having the Tridentine calendar Vigils of St. Laurence (10 August) and of the Blessed Virgin Mary's Assumption (15 August), instead has the Vigils of the Blessed Virgin Mary's Annunciation (25 March) and of Her Purification (2 February). In 1879, Pope Leo XIII added to those in the Roman Rite the vigil of the Immaculate Conception, raising the number of vigils to 17. In 1955, Pope Pius XII reduced the number to 7, suppressing the vigils of the Immaculate Conception, Epiphany, and All Saints and all vigils of apostles except that of Ss. Peter and Paul. In the 1950s, Pope Pius XII instituted a reform of the Easter Vigil, first on an experimental basis, then making it obligatory in 1955. Among other changes, he changed the hour of the service from Holy Saturday morning to after sunset in the following night, thus restoring it to something like the original meaning of a Christian vigil service.

The Code of Rubrics published by his successor Pope John XXIII in 1960 explicitly recognized the altered character of the Easter Vigil, which made no longer applicable to it the definition of "vigil", as the "eve of a feast", that held for vigils since the Middle Ages. It declared:

By "vigil" is understood a liturgical day which precedes some feast and has the nature of a preparation for the feast.
The Easter vigil, however, since it is not a liturgical day, is celebrated in its own way, as a night watch.

In the Catholic Church, Pope Paul VI's 1969 motu proprio Mysterii Paschalis made the liturgical day correspond in general to what is generally understood today, running from midnight to midnight, instead of beginning with vespers of the evening before.

== Present-day usage ==
=== Catholic Church ===
As an exception to Paul VI's ruling, the celebration of Sundays and solemnities begins on the evening of the preceding day.

The Second Vatican Council's Decree on the Catholic Churches of the Eastern Rite prescribed that the Eastern Churches' precepts regarding participation in the Divine Liturgy or the Divine Office could be fulfilled during the period from Vespers on the day's vigil to the end of the Sunday or the feast day concerned.

In the Liturgy of the Hours, the canonical hour that used to be called matins and that Benedictine monks celebrated at about 2 a.m. is now called the Office of Readings. "While retaining its nocturnal character for those who wish to celebrate a vigil, [it] is now of such a nature that it can be said at any time during the day". The Catholic Church has thus restored to the word "vigil" the meaning it had in early Christianity.

For those who wish to extend, in accordance with tradition, the celebration of the vigil of Sundays, solemnities and feasts, Appendix I in the book of the Liturgy of the Hours indicates for each three Old Testament canticles and a Gospel reading for optional insertion after the regular readings. The Gospel reading may be followed by a homily.

A few solemnities are "endowed with their own Vigil Masses, which are to be used on the evening of the preceding day, if an evening Mass is celebrated". The readings and prayers of such vigil Masses differ from the texts in the Masses to be celebrated on the day itself. The solemnities that have a vigil Mass are:

1. Easter Sunday
2. The Ascension of the Lord
3. Pentecost
4. The Nativity of St John the Baptist (24 June)
5. St Peter and St Paul (29 June)
6. The Assumption of the Blessed Virgin Mary (15 August)
7. The Nativity of the Lord (25 December)
8. The Epiphany of the Lord (6 January or Sunday between 2 and 8 January)

Sundays as such have no vigil Mass: only if one of the listed solemnities falls on a Sunday (as Easter and Pentecost always do) is there a difference between the readings and prayers at the Saturday evening Mass and Mass on the Sunday itself.

While the Universal Norms on the Liturgical Year and the Calendar thus give a restricted meaning to the term "vigil Mass", the same term is sometimes used in a broader sense as indicated by the Collins English Dictionary definition: "a Mass held on Saturday evening, attendance at which fulfils one's obligation to attend Mass on Sunday".

An "anticipated Mass" is another name used for such a Mass attended in fulfilment of the obligation spoken of in the 1983 Code of Canon Law, "On Sundays and other holy days of obligation, the faithful are obliged to participate in the Mass. [...] A person who assists at a Mass celebrated anywhere in a Catholic rite either on the feast day itself or in the evening of the preceding day satisfies the obligation of participating in the Mass".

=== Other traditions ===
In the Methodist churches, Watchnight Vigil services are celebrated on New Year's Eve.

== See also ==
- All-night vigil
- Benedictine Rite
- Canonical hours
- Liturgy of the Hours
- Matins
- Roman Rite
- Watchnight service
