= Book of Worship for Church and Home (1965) =

Liturgical book of The Methodist Church

The Book of Worship for Church and Home (1965) was the second liturgical book of The Methodist Church, replacing the 1945 book of the same name. This book was replaced in 1992 with The United Methodist Book of Worship.

The 1945 book, whose use was considered optional and completely voluntary, was ordered revised by the 1956 General Conference. Professor Fred D. Gealy was the editorial consultant to an 18-member Commission on Worship that produced the 423 page book. It was approved by the General Conference on May 6, 1964. Until this book was published the ritual was included in The Book of Discipline of the Methodist Church.

The book is divided into five parts, the first titled The General Services, and consists of both a brief and full orders of worship, and the rituals of baptism, confirmation, the Lord's Supper (including a brief form), marriage, burial and the ordination services. Until this book was published the service of confirmation was referred to as The Reception of Members, with the term confirmation first appearing in Methodist ritual in this book. The ordination services were replaced in 1981 with a new Ordinal. The second section is Aids for the Ordering of Worship, which was divided into two parts. The first part is The Christian Year and consists of a one-year lectionary, collects, invocations and calls to worship for the various liturgical seasons along with prayers and special services for specific days of the calendar. The second part is General Aids and consists of various prayers, liturgies and table graces. The third section is titled Acts of Praise and consists of the Psalter and canticles. The fourth section is titled The Occasional Services of the Church and includes 18 services among which are laying of the cornerstone of a church, blessing of a dwelling, and recognition of officials in the church. The fifth section, titled Services in the (United) Methodist Tradition, contains the traditional historic services which includes the love feast, the covenant service and the Order for Morning Prayer from The Sunday Service of the Methodists, which was written and authorized by John Wesley.

Most of the scripture quoted in this volume is given in the Revised Standard Version translation of the Bible, as opposed to the King James Version which had been used previously.
