= Watchnight service =

Late-night Christian church service

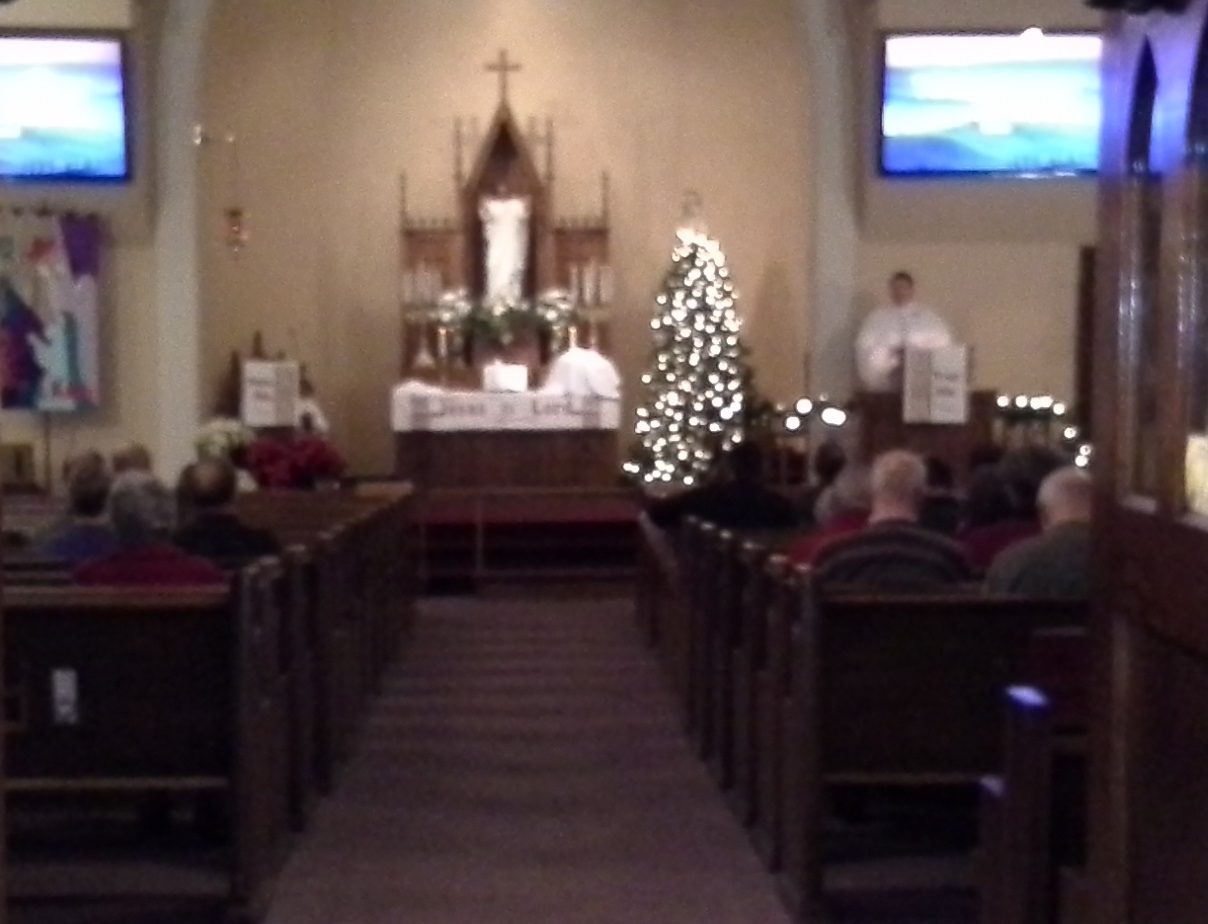
A watchnight service at a Lutheran Christian church on New Year's Eve (2014)

A watchnight service (also called Watchnight Mass) is a late-night Christian church service. In many different Christian traditions, such as those of Moravians, Methodists, Catholics, Lutherans, Anglicans, Baptists, Adventists and Reformed Christians, watchnight services are held late on New Year's Eve, which is the seventh day of Christmastide. This provides the opportunity for Christians to review the year that has passed and make confession, and then prepare for the year ahead by praying and resolving. The services often include singing, praying, exhorting, preaching, and Holy Communion.

Watchnight services can take the form of Watchnight Covenant Renewal Services, Watchnight Vespers services, Watchnight Vigil services, or Watchnight Masses. As Watchnight services bring in the New Year by glorifying God, they are seen by many Christians as being preferable to "drunken revelry" in popular cultural celebrations that are commonplace in some localities.

In addition to Christian denominational practices, the ethnic customs of Koreans and African Americans have a strong tradition of New Year's Eve watchnight services.

== History ==
The Bible documents that at the time of the Exodus from Egypt, God ordered Moses to "set up the tabernacle of the tent of the congregation" on "the first day of the first month" (Exodus 40:2).

In Christianity, since the time of the early Church, Christians have held vigils (watchnights) before the celebration of feast days, a practice "inspired by Jesus's example of praying all night before important decisions." At that time, non-Christians of the Greco-Roman world observed the arrival of the New Year with "revelling" and Christians distinguished themselves by instead praying and fasting.

Throughout history, Christian denominations including the Catholic Church, Lutheran Church and Anglican Church have variously observed the eighth day of Christmastide—New Year's Day—as the Feast of the Circumcision of Christ, Feast of the Holy Name and Solemnity of Mary, Mother of God, with the evening before having the Vigil Mass (Watchnight Mass) for the feast.

The Moravian Church came to hold a lovefeast on New Year's Eve, followed by a watchnight service in the evening. These watchnight services last three hours and have been held since they became popular in the Czech Republic in 1733.

After attending a Moravian watchnight service on New Year's Eve in 1738, John Wesley, the father of the Methodist movement, recorded that "as we were continuing instant in prayer, the power of God came mightily upon us, insomuch that many cried for exceeding joy, and many fell to the ground." The Methodist churches, strongly influenced by the Moravian Church and Radical Pietism in general, herald the practice of the Watchnight Service, with John Wesley having emphasized that it was "customary with the ancient Christians to spend whole nights in prayer".

The practice of holding watchnight services on New Year's Eve became common throughout Christendom, with many Christian denominations now offering them.

== By Christian denomination ==
=== Moravianism ===
In the Moravian Church, congregations observe a watchnight service on New Year's Eve, which is preceded by the celebration of the lovefeast. The three-hour watchnight service of Moravian Christians traces back to at least 1733.

=== Methodism ===
Following the lead of the Moravian Brethren who began having "watch" services in 1733, the founder of the Methodist Church, John Wesley, adopted watch night services in 1740, sometimes calling them Covenant Renewal Services. The services provided Methodist Christians with a godly alternative to times of drunken revelry, including New Year's Eve. A Methodist watchnight service includes singing, spontaneous prayers and testimonials, as well as scripture readings and Holy Communion; the liturgy for this service, which is held on New Year's Eve, is found in Methodist liturgical books, such as The United Methodist Book of Worship. In Britain, this tradition is preserved in the Covenant Service, and the British Methodist Church lists hymns when this is done as a "Watchnight Service into New Year".

=== Lutheranism ===
In the Lutheran churches, Watchnight Masses are celebrated with the purpose of "welcoming the new year with praises to Almighty God."

=== Catholic Church ===
In the Roman Rite of the Catholic Church, Mass can be held on New Year's Eve into New Year's Day around midnight; these are sometimes called the "Watch Night Mass" or "Watchnight Mass". The Archdiocese of Nassau has watchnight services at parishes throughout the ecclesiastical territory.

=== Anglicanism ===
Many Anglican parishes hold watchnight services, including several cathedrals, among them being Ripon Cathedral, St Andrew's Cathedral, Singapore and Cathedral Church of Christ, Lagos.

The Protestant Episcopal Church in the United States of America contains a liturgy for the Watchnight Service in The Book of Occasional Services. In The Living Church, Fr. William M. Lawbaugh stated that "Watchnight Services on New Year’s Eve have a lot to offer the Episcopal Church, not only to dispel the ugly notions of alcohol abuse but also to reform ourselves." The Anglican watchnight service includes "lessons, psalms, and collects" as well as Holy Communion.

=== Presbyterianism ===
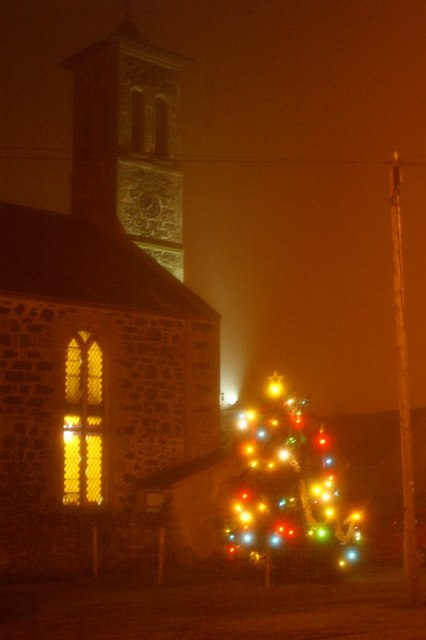
Watchnight on 24 December at the Church of Scotland church in Rattray

In the Presbyterian churches, watchnight services are held on New Year's Eve (Hogmanay); they often include the singing of hymns and the sharing of testimonies by congregants, such as how God has blessed them that year. St Cuthbert's Church, Edinburgh, a parish of the Church of Scotland, is known for its New Year's Eve watchnight service. In the Church of Scotland, a Watchnight service also refers to a popular ceremony marking the beginning of Christmas Day.

=== Congregationalism ===
In many Congregationalist churches, such as the United Church of Christ, watchnight services are held on the night of New Year's Eve.

=== Continental Reformed ===
The Continental Reformed churches, such as parishes of the United Reformed Church, offer Watchight Services on New Year's Eve.

=== Baptists ===
Watchnight services are held on New Year's Eve in many Baptist churches, with a focus on "renewed consecration and drawing nearer to the Saviour".

=== Adventism ===
In Adventist churches, watchnight services are celebrated on New Year's Eve with "testimonies, praise songs, [and] psalms" in order to "give God thanks for keeping us through a trying year and asking his guidance as we anticipate the new year and Him leading us in that period".

=== Pentecostalism ===
Many Pentecostal churches hold watchnight services in the late hours of New Year's Eve to pray over the new year.

=== Orthodox Christian ===
In most Russian Orthodox churches as well as in other Orthodox churches of Slavic origin, there is a weekly Vigil. This takes place usually on Saturday evening. It is a combination of Vespers and Matins. A similar arrangement is also used on the eve of most feast days. Usually an Intense Litany is added. On Christmas eve, Epiphany eve and Annunciation eve there is also a Vigil, however it is a combination of Great Compline and Matins. Greek Orthodox churches usually have Vespers in the evening and celebrate Matins before the Divine Liturgy. In some Greek monasteries Vigils are held before major feast days, particularly on the eve before the celebration of the patron saint or event after which the monastery is named.

== Ethnic traditions ==
=== African Americans ===
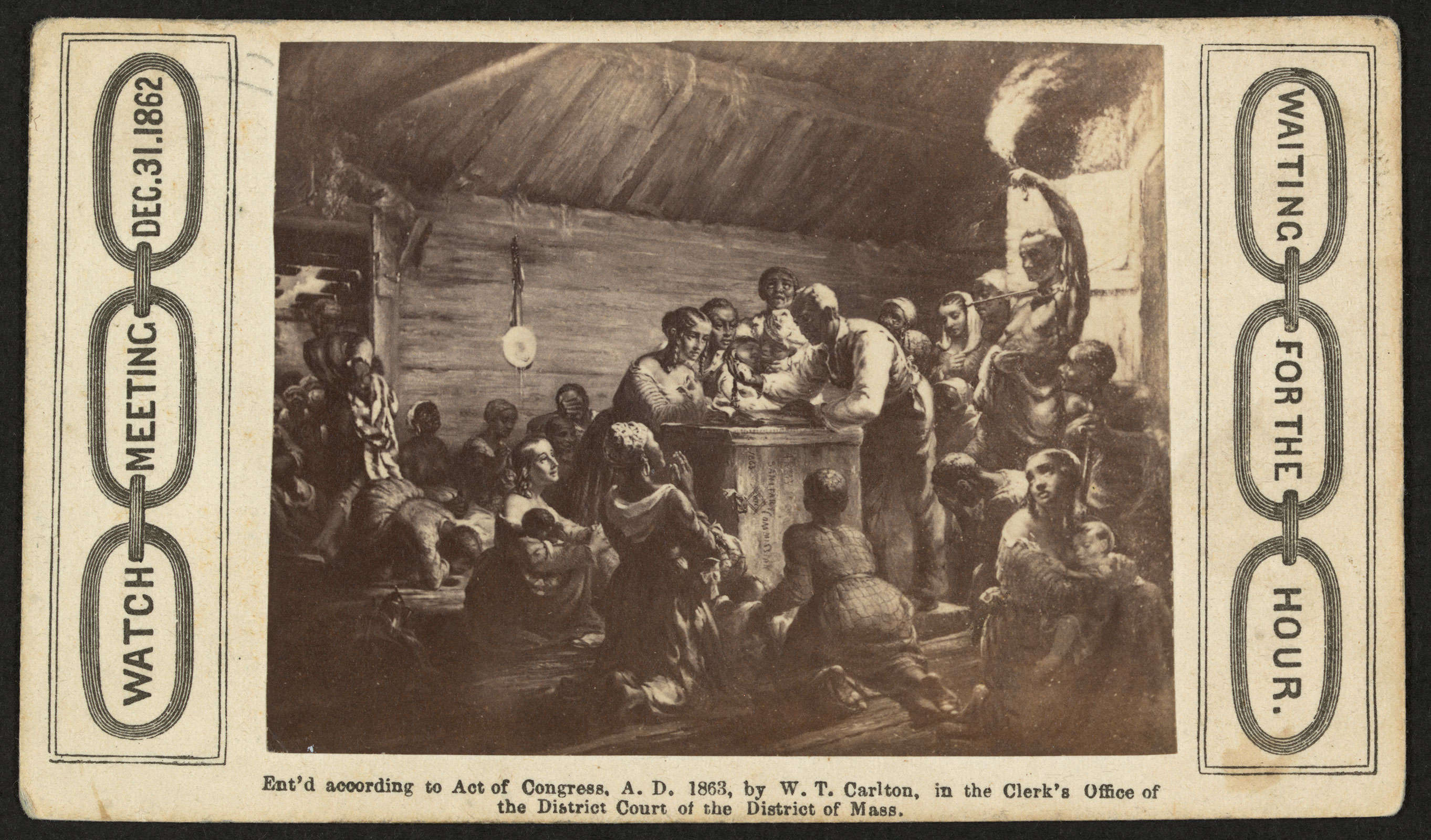
Group of African Americans waiting for midnight on New Year's Eve 1862

In the antebellum United States, slaveowners would settle their debts on January 1, often by selling or renting out their slaves, and thereby splitting families apart. January 1 was therefore known as "Heartbreak Day" to slaves, many of whom spent the day before praying that their families would remain together. Lewis Clarke wrote that "Of all days in the year, the slaves dread New Year's Day the worst of any". However, the date took on a new meaning when President Abraham Lincoln signed the Emancipation Proclamation on 1 January 1863. Slaves gathered in churches on the night of 31 December 1862, which was called Freedom's Eve, awaiting the hour when the Emancipation Proclamation would come into effect. As such, watchnight services in the Black Church are widely attended.

African-American Methodists have long celebrated watchnight services as Methodist parishes in the United States, such as St. George's United Methodist Church and Mother Bethel A.M.E. Church, held them on New Year's Eve in accordance with Methodist customs.

=== Korean community ===
Korean Christians have a strong tradition of watchnight services on New Year's Eve.

== See also ==
- New Year's resolution
