= The Sunday Service of the Methodists =

Original Christian liturgical book of the Methodist churches

The Sunday Service of the Methodists (Note: Initially it was named The Sunday Service of the Methodists in North America with other Occasional Services and sent over with Thomas Coke for the use of the early American Methodists. In subsequent editions "North America" in the title is omitted (e.g. The Sunday Service of the Methodists, With Other Occasional Services) or replaced by other topographical references. The title is commonly shortened to The Sunday Service of the Methodists.) is the first Christian liturgical book given to the Methodist tradition by their founder, John Wesley. It has its basis in the 1662 Book of Common Prayer. Editions were produced for Methodists in both the British Empire and North America. Wesley published the first edition in 1784 as The Sunday Service of the Methodists in North America with Other Occasional Services.

The liturgical book reflects Wesley's theological preferences and the divergence between Anglicanism and Methodism. For instance, the officiant is referred to as "minister", "elder" or "deacon", not "priest". Among the items of the Book of Common Prayer that Wesley "did not undertake to defend" were saints' days, priestly absolutions, the answers of the sponsors in baptism, private baptism, sung liturgical texts, the ring ceremony in the marriage rite, (Note: The wearing of plain dress has historically been practiced by many Methodist Churches, in keeping with the teaching of John Wesley, who stated that people should not be "adorned with gold, or pearls, or costly apparel" (this clause is contained in The General Rules of the Methodist Church). Wesley did not include the ring ceremony in The Sunday Service of the Methodists, likely due to concerns over the discouragment of ornamentation in the Bible (cf. 1 Peter 3:3–4, 1 Timothy 2:9–10). A number of Methodist denominations continue to proscribe wedding rings, such as the Allegheny Wesleyan Methodist Connection, Bible Methodist Connection of Churches, Evangelical Wesleyan Church and the Evangelical Methodist Church Conference, among others.) and certain resurrection language in the burial rite. The Nicene Creed is also excluded from the communion rite, as the Apostles' Creed is already recited in Morning Prayer. Some prayers use modernised language, such as changing the Lord's Prayer from "which art in heaven" to "who art in heaven". Christian theologian Henry Bett deemed the changes reflected in The Sunday Service of the Methodists as theologically "very significant".

In England, Wesley's liturgical book was not replaced in the Wesleyan Methodist Church until 1882; and even then, though not widely used, it continued in print for a while. The Sunday Service has immensely influenced later Methodist liturgical texts. The Order for Morning Prayer for the Methodist Episcopal Church, for example, was adapted from The Sunday Service. Later, the 1965 Book of Worship for Church and Home reprinted the original Morning Prayer office used in The Sunday Service. Many of the liturgical rites, such as that of the Lord's Supper, in "The Ritual" of The Discipline of The Allegheny Wesleyan Methodist Connection, have preserved various prayers published in The Sunday Service.

== See also ==
- Twenty-five Articles
- Sermons on Several Occasions
- Wesley's Covenant Renewal Service
