= Covenant Renewal Service =

Approach in Methodism

The Covenant Renewal Service, or simply called the Covenant Service, was adapted by John Wesley, the founder of Methodism, for the purpose of the renewal of the Christian believer's covenant with God. Wesley's Directions for Renewing Our Covenant with God, first published in 1780, contains his instructions for a covenant service adapted from the writings of Richard Alleine and intended for use in Methodist worship as "a means of increasing serious religion." The first such service was held on 11 August 1755, in London.

Congregations of some Methodist connexions (notably in the United Methodist Church, Free Methodist Church and Pilgrim Holiness Church in the United States) often use the Covenant Renewal liturgy for the watchnight service of New Year's Eve and New Year's Day. In the Methodist Church in Britain the custom is for the service to be held on the first Sunday of the New Year when a presbyter is available (since the Covenant service order includes Holy Communion, which according to British Methodist discipline cannot normally be presided over by a local preacher). In both cases the purpose is to renew one's commitment to Christ and the Church at the start of the year. It includes hymns, prayers—centred on the Covenant Prayer—scripture lessons, a sermon, and Holy Communion.

The covenant prayer and service are recognised as one of the most distinctive contributions of Methodism to the liturgy of Protestantism in general, and they are also used from time to time by other Christian denominations.

== Origins ==
In 1663 Richard Alleine, a Puritan, published Vindiciae Pietatis: or, A Vindication of Godliness in the Greater Strictness and Spirituality of It. In 1753, it was again published in John Wesley's A Christian Library.

In his Short history of the people called Methodists, Wesley describes the first covenant service; a similar account is to be found in his Journal of the time. He says the first service was held on Monday 11 August 1755, at the French church at Spitalfields in London, with 1800 people present. Wesley reports that he "recited the tenor of the covenant proposed, in the words of that blessed man, Richard Alleine". The original words are lost, but are thought to be reflected in the Directions for Renewing our Covenant with God in 1780. This later text, known in modified form as the Wesley Covenant Prayer, remained in use—linked with Holy Communion and observed on the first Sunday of the New Year—among British Methodists until 1936.

The origins of the covenant prayer have been the subject of some scholarly discussion. While Wesley attributes its "tenor" to Alleine, influences of German Pietism have also been claimed.

== Modern usage ==
Services using the covenant prayer have been included in most Methodist books of liturgy since, though none was included in The Sunday Service of the Methodists; With Other Occasional Services book that Wesley published in 1784 for the use of his followers in America. Perhaps for this reason, while the Covenant service has been an invariable part of the liturgy of the British Methodist Church and its daughter churches in the Commonwealth, its use is less widespread in American Methodist denominations. Referring to the United Methodist Church, Charles R. Hohenstein notes that "covenant services are seldom encountered these days", though theologian Leonard Sweet notes that certain Methodist connexions such as the Free Methodist Church and Pilgrim Holiness Church have maintained the tradition of covenant renewal services.

Although Wesley's early covenant services were not held at any particular time of year, in British Methodism the custom soon developed of holding Covenant services near the beginning of the New Year, nowadays often on the first Sunday of the year. This was perhaps under the influence of the Methodist tradition of holding watchnight services on New Year's Eve, which are held to welcome the coming year with the blessing of God rather than with "drunken revelry".

In the 1920s, British Wesleyan Methodist minister George B. Robson expanded the form of the Covenant Service by replacing most of the exhortation with prayers of adoration, thanksgiving and confession. Robson's Covenant Service was revised and officially authorised for use in the Book of Offices (1936). Further revisions, strengthening the link with Communion and intercession for the wider church and the world, appeared in the Methodist Service Book (1975) and Methodist Worship Book (1999).

Although the form of the covenant prayer and service have been simplified, important elements of them are still retained from Wesley's Directions. They include many of the words both of the bidding that traditionally precedes the prayer, and the prayer itself. The bidding traditionally includes phrasing such as:

...Christ has many services to be done. Some are easy, others are difficult. Some bring honour, others bring reproach. Some are suitable to our natural inclinations and temporal interests, others are contrary to both... Yet the power to do all these things is given to us in Christ, who strengthens us.

=== Music ===
In 2012, a new worship resource titled Worship and Song was published by Abingdon Press. Worship and Song is a collection of 190 songs from around the world, as well as prayers and other liturgical resources. It contains a musical version of Wesley's prayer; the music was composed by ministers Adam F. Seate and Jay D. Locklear.

== The Prayer ==
Traditional
I am no longer my own, but thine.
Put me to what thou wilt, rank me with whom thou wilt.
Put me to doing, put me to suffering.
Let me be employed for thee or laid aside for thee,
exalted for thee or brought low for thee.
Let me be full, let me be empty.
Let me have all things, let me have nothing.
I freely and heartily yield all things to thy pleasure and disposal.
And now, O glorious and blessed God, Father, Son and Holy Spirit,

thou art mine, and I am thine.

So be it.
And the covenant which I have made on earth,
let it be ratified in heaven.
Amen.

(as used in the Book of Offices of the British Methodist Church, 1936).

Modern
I am no longer my own, but yours.
Put me to what you will, rank me with whom you will;
put me to doing, put me to suffering;
let me be employed for you, or laid aside for you,
exalted for you, or brought low for you;
let me be full,
let me be empty,
let me have all things,
let me have nothing:
I freely and wholeheartedly yield all things
to your pleasure and disposal.
And now, glorious and blessed God,
Father, Son and Holy Spirit,
you are mine and I am yours. So be it.
And the covenant now made on earth, let it be ratified in heaven.
Amen.

(as used in the Methodist Worship Book, 1999)

== See also ==
- Consecration
- Wesleyan covenant theology
