= List of Methodist theologians =

Methodist theologians include those theologians affiliated with any of the Methodist denominational churches such as The United Methodist Church, independent Methodists, or churches affiliated with the Holiness Movement including the Church of the Nazarene, the Free Methodist Church, the Wesleyan Methodist Church (America), the Wesleyan Methodist Church (Great Britain), the Pilgrim Holiness Church, and the Wesleyan Church, as well as other church organizations.

== Proto-Methodist theologians ==
- Jacobus Arminius - ordained pastor of the Dutch Reformed church, studied under Theodore Beza and rejected the teachings of John Calvin, inspired the Remonstrance and the soteriological system now known as Arminianism.
- Philip Doddridge - English Nonconformist minister, educator, and hymnwriter whose devotional and theological writings were widely used and promoted by John Wesley.
- Simon Episcopius - Dutch Arminian theologian and student of Arminius who systematized early Remonstrant theology, deeply influencing John Wesley's soteriology.
- John Goodwin - English Puritan minister and early defender of Arminian theology whose writings on divine grace and free will deeply influenced John Wesley and later Methodist thought.
- Hugo Grotius - playwright, poet, and humanist philosopher of the Aristotelian tradition, systematized Arminianism and developed the moral government theory of Christ's atonement.

== Founders of Methodism ==
- Charles Wesley - English Anglican leader of the Methodist movement, theologian, and prolific hymnwriter who composed thousands of hymns central to Methodist theology and worship.
- John Wesley - English Anglican cleric, theologian, and evangelist who, alongside his brother Charles, founded the Methodist movement and shaped its foundational doctrinal standards.
- George Whitefield - English Anglican cleric and evangelist who was a foundational leader of both Methodism and the wider evangelical movement, known for his powerful open-air preaching.

== 18th century ==
- Richard Allen - American minister, educator, and writer who founded the African Methodist Episcopal Church, the first independent Black denomination in the United States, and served as its first bishop.
- Francis Asbury - British-American Methodist minister and one of the first two bishop of the Methodist Episcopal Church, whose extensive circuit-riding and organizational leadership established Methodism across North America.
- Joseph Benson - English Methodist minister, theologian, and biblical commentator known for his extensive scriptural commentaries and leadership as president of the Wesleyan Conference.
- Thomas Coke - English bishop, first bishop of the Methodist Episcopal Church, and pioneer missionary who helped institutionalize and organize global Methodism.
- Joseph Cooke - English Methodist preacher who broke with Wesleyanism over doctrine, embracing a unitarian theology.
- John Fletcher - Early Swiss-born English Methodist divine and theologian, designated as Wesley's successor and celebrated for his systematic defense of Wesleyan theology in Checks to Antinomianism.
- Mary Bosanquet Fletcher - Early Methodist preacher and theologian who developed an influential theological defense of women's right to preach in her correspondence with John Wesley.
- Howell Harris - Welsh Calvinistic Methodist leader and revivalist whose outdoor preaching was central to the 18th-century Welsh Methodist revival.
- Edmund Jones - Welsh Independent minister and Calvinistic Methodist sympathizer known for his evangelical preaching and writings on Welsh spiritual life.
- William Williams Pantycelyn - Primary leader of the Welsh Calvinistic Methodist revival, acclaimed as Wales' greatest hymnwriter and theological poet.
- James Relly - Welsh preacher and former associate of George Whitefield who developed a prominent theology of Christian Universalism.

== 19th century ==
- Nathan Bangs - Arminian apologist, first editor of the Methodist magazine Christian Advocate, opposed the antinomianism of the New Light Baptist community.
- Catherine Booth - Co-founder of The Salvation Army and Holiness theologian who wrote influential works on sanctification and defended female ministry.
- William Booth - English Methodist preacher who, along with his wife Catherine, founded The Salvation Army, shaping Holiness Movement theology through social action, evangelism, and practical holiness.
- Borden Parker Bowne - American philosopher and theologian who founded the school of Boston Personalism, integrating Christian theology with personalistic idealism and shaping generations of Methodist thought.
- Jabez Bunting - influential English Wesleyan minister and administrator who defined post-Wesleyan denominational order, centralizing governance and shaping Victorian Methodist ecclesiology.
- Samuel Chadwick - British Wesleyan minister, author, and principal of Cliff College.
- Adam Clarke - Biblical theologian uncomfortable with systematic approaches to Christian theology, Wrote a single volume theology. He also wrote a commentary which became one of the most widely used commentaries of all time.
- Helenor M. Davisson - early American Methodist preacher and minister in Indiana who, upon her ordination in 1866, became the first woman ordained as a deacon in American Methodism.
- Samuel Dunn - Cornish Wesleyan Methodist minister and reformer who co-founded the Wesleyan Times and played a central role in the Reform movement within British Methodism.
- Wilbur Fisk - religious educator, favored ending slavery progressively (rather than in the revolutionary way proposed by other notable abolitionists, so as to avoid a split in the Church), early influence on the temperance movement
- William P. Harrison - American Methodist theologian, editor, and chaplain of the United States House of Representatives for the Methodist Episcopal Church, South.
- Hugh Price Hughes - Welsh social reformer, first editor of the Methodist Times and first superintendent of the West London Methodist Mission
- John F. Hurst - American Methodist bishop, educator, and church historian who served as the first chancellor of American University.
- Daniel Parish Kidder - American Methodist minister, bishop, and theologian known for his homiletics and missionary work in Brazil.
- Ira Haynes La Fetra - Methodist missionary, educator, and author whose work established educational institutions and expanded Protestant missions across South America.
- John Miley - wrote a two-volume systematic theology. Rejected the penal substitution theory of the atonement and advocated a moral government theory.
- Henry Clay Morrison - American Methodist evangelist and founder of Asbury Theological Seminary, a major institution of the Holiness movement.
- James Egan Moulton - English-born Australian Methodist missionary, educator, and translator who translated the Bible into Tongan.
- Phoebe Palmer - influential evangelist, author, and theologian considered the "mother of the Holiness Movement," known for her "altar theology," public preaching, and defense of women in Christian ministry.
- John Petty - English Primitive Methodist minister, educator, and author of the first comprehensive history of Primitive Methodism.
- William Burt Pope - British Wesleyan theologian and college professor whose three-volume Compendium of Christian Theology provides comprehensive classical defenses of Wesleyan systematic theology.
- B. T. Roberts - Founder of the Free Methodist Church and abolitionist theologian who advocated for social justice, equal rights for women, and the freedom of the oppressed.
- Martin Ruter - American Methodist minister, educator, and theologian who served as one of the earliest pioneers of Methodist higher education and missionary work in Texas.
- Daniel Steele - American Methodist minister, professor, and first president of Syracuse University, known for his writings on the theology of entire sanctification.
- James Strong - American biblical scholar, educator, and theologian best known for creating Strong's Exhaustive Concordance of the Bible.
- Thomas Osmond Summers - American Methodist Episcopal Church, South theologian, professor at Vanderbilt University, and editor who systematized Southern Methodist systematic theology.
- William Taylor - American missionary bishop of the Methodist Episcopal Church, known for his global evangelistic travels and pioneering self-supporting mission strategies.
- Milton Terry - American Methodist biblical scholar and educator.
- John H. Vincent - American Methodist bishop, editor, and co-founder of the Chautauqua Institution for adult education.
- Henry Hayes Vowles - British Wesleyan Methodist minister and writer known for his apologetic works.
- Richard Watson - outspoken British abolitionist, wrote against Clarke in defense of the eternal Sonship of Christ, one of the first theologians to systematize Wesley's theology.

== 20th century ==
- William J. Abraham - United Methodist philosopher and theologian; known for his work on epistemology, divine revelation, and canonical theism.
- Wesley Ariarajah - Sri Lankan Methodist theologian, minister, and ecumenical leader known for his extensive work on interreligious dialogue.
- Margaret Barker - British Old Testament scholar and Methodist local preacher who developed "Temple Theology".
- José Míguez Bonino - Argentine Methodist theologian and ecumenical leader, one of the founding voices of Latin American liberation theology.
- Peder Borgen - Norwegian Methodist minister, theologian, and professor specializing in Johannine literature and Philo of Alexandria.
- Edgar S. Brightman - philosopher and Christian theologian of the Boston Personalist movement who wrote extensively on process philosophy and liberal theology.
- George Wesley Buchanan - American United Methodist New Testament scholar and professor.
- William Ragsdale Cannon - American United Methodist bishop, church historian, and professor at Candler School of Theology.
- John B. Cobb - process theologian and environmentalist; prominent figure bridging process philosophy with Christian theology and ecological concerns.
- James H. Cone - African Methodist Episcopal Church minister and theologian; widely recognized as the founder of black liberation theology, bridging Christian theology with the struggle for civil rights and racial justice.
- Kenneth Cracknell - British Methodist theologian and pioneer in interfaith dialogue and mission studies.
- Lynn de Silva - Sri Lankan Methodist theologian and pioneer in Christian-Buddhist dialogue and indigenous Asian theology.
- L. Harold DeWolf - American United Methodist theologian and Boston University professor who served as the primary doctoral advisor to Martin Luther King Jr.
- H. Ray Dunning - Nazarene theologian and longtime professor at Trevecca Nazarene University, best known for authoring Grace, Faith, and Holiness, a seminal systematic theology textbook across the Wesleyan-Holiness tradition.
- Ralph Earle - Nazarene biblical scholar, theologian, and former president of the Evangelical Theological Society who contributed to the New International Version Bible translation.
- Robert Newton Flew - British Methodist theologian, educator, and ecumenical pioneer best known for his study on Christian perfection, The Idea of Perfection in Christian Theology.
- Justo L. González - Cuban-American United Methodist historian and theologian whose writings on church history and Hispanic theology have widely shaped theological education.
- Jacquelyn Grant - American African Methodist Episcopal Church minister, theologian, and founder of Womanist theology.
- William M. Greathouse - Nazarene theologian, bishop, and president of Nazarene Theological Seminary who wrote extensively on Wesleyan sanctification and biblical holiness.
- J. Kenneth Grider - Wesleyan-Holiness theologian and professor at Nazarene Theological Seminary who served on the translation committee for the New International Version Bible translation.
- Georgia Harkness - theologian, philosopher, and professor; the first woman to serve as a full professor in a theological seminary in the United States, and a major figure in the ecumenical movement.
- Sione ʻAmanaki Havea - Tongan Methodist theologian and ecumenical leader who pioneered Pacific context theology, notably coconut theology.
- Franz Hildebrandt - German Lutheran-turned-Methodist theologian, close associate of Dietrich Bonhoeffer, and scholar of Wesleyan theology and ecumenism.
- Theodore Jennings - American United Methodist theologian, author, and professor at Chicago Theological Seminary specializing in constructive and queer theology.
- E. Stanley Jones - missionary, theologian, and author; pioneer in Christian mission and interreligious dialogue, noted for his writings on the Kingdom of God and Christian pacifism.
- Albert C. Knudson - United Methodist theologian and dean of Boston University School of Theology, key figure in Boston Personalism who integrated personalist metaphysics with Christian systematic theology.
- Edwin Lewis - Canadian-born American Methodist theologian and professor at Drew Theological Seminary who shifted from liberal theology to a neoclassic Christian orthodoxy.
- I. Howard Marshall - Scottish evangelical New Testament scholar and theologian who wrote extensively on Lucan theology and defended Arminian soteriology within biblical scholarship.
- Donald E. Messer - American United Methodist theologian, author, and president emeritus of Iliff School of Theology.
- Stephen Charles Mott - American United Methodist theologian and ethicist specializing in Christian social ethics and biblical justice.
- Thomas C. Oden - United Methodist theologian and patristics scholar; best known for championing "Paleo-orthodoxy" and editing the Ancient Christian Commentary on Scripture.
- Albert C. Outler - United Methodist theologian, historian, and ecumenical leader; key editor of the works of John Wesley and a prominent voice at Vatican II.
- Garfield Bromley Oxnam - American United Methodist bishop, educator, and ecumenical leader who served as president of the World Council of Churches.
- Navamani Elia Peter - Indian Methodist theologian and writer noted for contributions to context-specific Indian theology.
- Paul Ramsey - Christian ethicist and theologian; professor at Princeton University and one of the primary founders of the field of modern bioethics.
- William Edwin Sangster - British Methodist preacher, theologian, and church leader acclaimed for his practical theology, homiletics, and defense of the Wesleyan doctrine of Christian perfection.
- Vincent Taylor - British Methodist minister and New Testament scholar internationally recognized for his landmark commentaries and form-critical studies on the Gospel of Mark and the Atonement.
- Alan Walker - Australian Methodist evangelist, theologian, and founder of Lifeline international counseling ministry.
- Henry Orton Wiley - Nazarene theologian and educator; author of the influential systematic theology textbook Christian Theology and former president of Pasadena College.
- Walter Wink - American United Methodist theologian and biblical scholar best known for his work on Christian nonviolence.
- Mildred Bangs Wynkoop - Nazarene theologian and educator; wrote extensively on Wesleyan theology and holiness.
- Frances Young - British Methodist minister, theologian, and patristic scholar known for her work on early church history and disability theology.

== 21st century ==
- William J. Abraham - United Methodist philosopher and theologian; known for his work on epistemology, divine revelation, and canonical theism.
- Marcella Althaus-Reid - Argentine-born theologian and first female professor of theology at the University of Edinburgh, known for her pioneering work in feminist, liberation, and queer theology.
- Warren Carter - New Testament scholar and professor of New Testament at Brite Divinity School specializing in the Gospels and Roman imperial context.
- David L. Clough - British Methodist theologian and professor of theological ethics, known for his work on animal theology and ethics.
- Kenneth J. Collins - Global Methodist theologian and leading scholar on John Wesley's life, soteriology, and spiritual formation.
- Leah Gaskin Fitchue - American African Methodist Episcopal Church scholar, administrator, and first female president of Payne Theological Seminary.
- Dion Forster - South African Methodist theologian and professor specializing in public theology, social justice, and ethics.
- Ying Fuk-tsang - Hong Kong Chinese historian and theologian specializing in Christianity in modern China.
- Joel B. Green - New Testament scholar and theologian at Fuller Theological Seminary, known for his work on Luke-Acts and theological interpretation from a Wesleyan perspective.
- Adam Hamilton – United Methodist pastor, author, and theologian who founded the Church of the Resurrection and has written extensively on practical theology, Christian living, and biblical interpretation. Current Democratic United States senator-elect from Kansas.
- Stanley Hauerwas - influential theological ethicist, Christian pacifist, and advocate of virtue ethics and narrative theology who spent much of his career teaching within the United Methodist tradition.
- Richard B. Hays - American United Methodist New Testament scholar and professor emeritus at Duke Divinity School known for his work on Pauline ethics and intertextuality.
- Obery M. Hendricks Jr. - American scholar, author, and United Methodist minister specializing in biblical interpretation, African American religion, and social justice.
- Scott J. Jones - American United Methodist bishop, theologian, and author specializing in Wesley's theology and evangelism.
- Jane Leach - British Methodist minister, theologian, and educator focusing on practical theology, pastoral care, and theological education.
- Bill Loader - Australian New Testament scholar and Uniting Church minister known for extensive writings on Christology and sexuality in antiquity.
- Randy L. Maddox - Leading United Methodist Wesleyan theologian and historian, responsible for producing the first comprehensive and critical edition of the works of John Wesley.
- Christopher Morse - United Methodist theologian and professor at Union Theological Seminary who developed a constructive theology emphasizing "faithful disbelief" and Christian dogmatics.
- Mercy Amba Oduyoye - Ghanaian Methodist theologian often called the "mother of African women's theology," founder of the Circle of Concerned African Women Theologians.
- Thomas Jay Oord - Wesleyan-Holiness theologian and philosopher known for his work on process theology, open theism, and the theology of love.
- Andrew S. Park - Korean-American United Methodist systematic theologian and pioneer in Asian American liberation theology, known for his work on the concept of han and Christian mysticism.
- Anthony G. Reddie - British Methodist theologian, author, and Director of the Centre of Black Theology at Regent’s Park College, University of Oxford, leading figure in Black theology in Britain.
- Joerg Rieger - constructive theologian and professor; known for his work on theology, economics, and labor movements within the Wesleyan tradition.
- Don Saliers - American United Methodist theologian, musician, and professor emeritus at Candler School of Theology specializing in liturgy and theology.
- Marjorie Hewitt Suchocki - United Methodist process theologian and professor emerita at Claremont School of Theology, leading thinker in process theology and divine relationality.
- Leonard Sweet - American United Methodist theologian, author, and professor known for his writings on postmodern Christianity and church culture.
- Richard S. Taylor - Nazarene theologian and author who wrote extensively on Wesleyan-Holiness theology, Christian ethics, and personal sanctification.
- Geoffrey Wainwright - British Methodist theologian and ecumenical leader known for his work in liturgical theology and systematic theology.
- Will Willimon - United Methodist bishop, practical theologian, and author; noted for his prolific writings on ministry, preaching, and Christian counter-culture.
- Ben Witherington III - New Testament scholar and Wesleyan theologian; author of numerous commentaries and works bridging biblical studies and contemporary theology.
- Regunta Yesurathnam - Indian Methodist theologian and former principal of the United Theological College, Bengaluru.
- Francis Ching-wah Yip - Hong Kong Methodist theologian, professor, and director of the Divinity School of Chung Chi College, Chinese University of Hong Kong.

== See also ==
- List of Methodists
- List of Methodist churches
- List of Methodist denominations
- Saints in Methodism
- Divergence between Anglicanism and Methodism
