= Francis Yip =

Francis Yip may refer to:

- Frances Yip (born 1947), Hong Kong actress
- Francis Ching-wah Yip (born 1967), Hong Kong theologian
- Françoise Yip (born 1972), Chinese-Canadian actress
