= Andrew S. Park =

Korean American Methodist theologian

- Hangul: 박승호
- RR: Bak Seungho
- MR: Pak Sŭngho

Andrew Sung Park is a Korean American Methodist theologian. Park teaches at United Theological Seminary in Trotwood, Ohio. He specializes in systematic theology, global theology, cross-cultural theology, Asian American liberation theology, Christian mysticism, and the relationship between religion and science. He has expanded the theology of emotional pain by exploring the Korean concept of han.

== Personal life ==
Park was born in South Korea. His family emigrated from South Korea to the United States in 1973. He lives in Beavercreek, Ohio with his wife Jane Myong, and has two children, Amos Park and Thomas Park.

== Education and career ==
In 1973, Park received a B.A. at Methodist Theological Seminary. At Iliff School of Theology in 1978, he received M.Div. Then he attended Claremont School of Theology and obtained a M.A. in 1981. Park finally received a Ph.D. at Graduate Theological Union in 1985; his dissertation there discussed minjung theology. He would go on to join United Theological Seminary in Ohio in 1992.

== Books ==
- Triune Atonement: Christ's Healing for Sinners, Victims, and the Whole Creation, Westminster John Knox, 2009, ISBN 0-664-23347-3
- From Hurt to Healing: A Theology of the Wounded, Abingdon Press, 2004, ISBN 0-687-03881-2
- The Other Side of Sin, Co-editor with Susan Nelson, State University of New York Press, 2001, ISBN 0-7914-5042-2
- Racial Conflict and Healing: An Asian-American Theological Perspective, Orbis Books, 1996, ISBN 1-57075-078-5
- Korean Family Devotions, Co-Author with Brandon Cho, K. Samuel Lee, and Heisik Oh. Upper Room Books, 1994, ISBN 0-8358-0712-6
- The Wounded Heart of God: The Asian Concept of Han and the Christian Doctrine of Sin, Abingdon Press, 1993, ISBN 0-687-38536-9

== See also ==
- List of Methodist theologians
