= Coconut theology =

Coconut theology was an attempt by the Tongan Methodist minister Sione 'Amanaki Havea to create a contextual theology that spoke to the specific experience and context of Pacific Island or Oceanic culture. Havea used the coconut to point to certain theological themes, such as the life, death, and resurrection of Jesus Christ and God's action in the world. Though it has not been widely embraced by Oceanic churches, it marks the first significant attempt towards a Pacific theology.

== Background ==
The call for a viable Pacific theology can be traced back to the founding of the Pacific Conference of Churches in 1976. At the Third Assembly of the PCC, Sir John Guise challenged Christians to begin looking for the Pacific Christ, rather than "a Christ who was white faced, thin lipped and blue eyed". He felt that the church could not relate to a Christ that was not a living reality in their context.

The term coconut theology was first coined by Sione 'Amanaki Havea in 1985 in a paper he gave at a theological consultation in Suva, Fiji. Havea argued that when missionaries brought Christianity to the Pacific in the 19th century, they failed to remove it from Western culture and assumptions. It was brought in a "Western theological pot" and needed to be nurtured in "local soil". This became known as the "pot-plant transportation model" of contextualization. He proposed that Jesus chose symbols from his own Hebrew-Palestinian culture not because of their intrinsic value but because they were ubiquitous. However, many of these symbols, such as sheep, bread, ploughs, and olives, never existed in the Pacific islands before contact with the West. Therefore, Havea suggests, if Jesus had been born in the Pacific context, he would have used symbols that were more indicative of life there, such as coconuts, taro, and kava. He claimed that Jesus would have said "I am the coconut of life" rather than "I am the bread of life."

== Key principles ==
Coconut theology is based on the assumption that coconuts are essential to all life in the Pacific Islands. From this symbol, three theological categories are derived.

=== Christology ===
The coconut exemplifies the incarnation, death, and resurrection of Jesus Christ. The coconut falls from the highest point on the tree, symbolizing Jesus' descent from God the Father. Then, the coconut rolls to the lowest point on the ground, representing Christ's humility, and if left, it will begin the process of dying. A shoot will push through the shell and the husk to form a new coconut tree. This is similar to the way that Jesus was left to die, but from his death new life comes forth.

=== Kairos ===
The coconut cannot mature faster or slower. It goes in its own time. This suggests that all things will happen in their own course and cannot be hurried by human intervention, the same way that we are subject to God's ordination of time. This is supported by the bible, such as Ecclesiastes 3:1–8 and Mark 1:15, that says that there is a time for everything.

=== Communion ===
The coconut has been used as the elements of the Lord's Supper. When it is broken, it provides both food and drink. This is in line with Havea's thinking that if Jesus were born in the Pacific, he would have used the local equivalents of bread and wine. The coconut can also be used in liturgy to dramatize the life and death of Jesus.

== Criticism ==
One critique which has been raised against Havea's coconut theology has been that it focuses too much on Oceanic culture and traditions while straying too far away from the Bible. Havea's theology is based in the belief that the idea of Christ existed in the Pacific, and missionaries simply provided the full understanding of his personhood. Ma'afu Palu argues that, instead, Jesus should not be taken too far from how he is revealed in scriptures.

Another accusation by Palu is that this concept of the Pacific Christ does not focus enough on the cross. While the symbol of death is present in the coconut, there is not the same notion of suffering and salvation as there is in the bible. The Pacific Christ presented focuses primarily on Christ's role as a good moral teacher.

There is also suggestion from Randall Prior that the symbol of the coconut is not strong enough to be the total embodiment of a Pacific theology. He seems sceptical that it can hold up to global scrutiny against other theologies, like liberation theology, which was born out of a particular experience and struggle. The coconut alone cannot fully speak to the larger political and economic context of Oceania.

There are also larger theological implications to using the coconut instead of bread and wine for the Eucharist, particularly for those holding to a higher understand of the sacraments.

== Legacy ==
Though coconut theology never became a fully embraced contextual theology, it incited efforts from other Oceanic theologians to develop an appropriate Pacific theology. The former principal of the Pacific Theological College Ilaitia Suvati Tuwere thought that vanua, the Fijian word for 'land', was important to salvation as a sign of God's redemptive power. He used traditional beliefs to highlight that humans must maintain a connection to the land in order to be renewed.

Bishop Leslie Boseto of the United Church in Papua New Guinea and the Solomon Islands took up the cause of Pacific theology by saying that the Gospel may be universal, but it must be translated into the local context. He saw a key characteristic of Pacific culture as being its strong sense of community and interdependence.

Keiti Ann Kanongata'a focuses on the woman's experience and claims that the Gospel is a call of liberation from oppressive social structures. She likens the birthing process and the hope for new life that accompanies it to God's mercy.

Seforosa Carroll also notes that one of the challenges facing Pacific Islanders is increasing migration of peoples which in turn leads to a feeling of displacement. As a result, any Pacific theology must address the loss of belonging and home.
