= Ira Haynes La Fetra =

Methodist Ira Haynes La Fetra Reverend
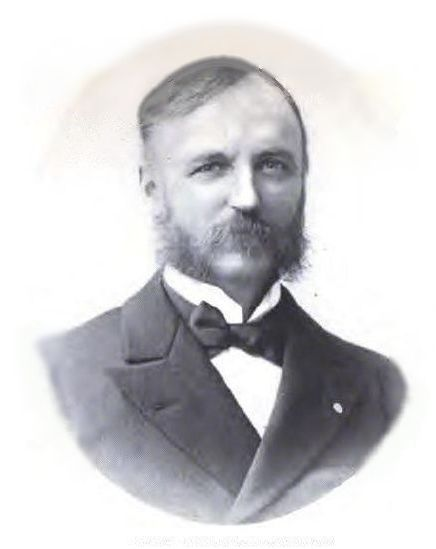

Personal details
- Born: March 3, 1851 Harveysburg, Ohio
- Died: December 16, 1917 (aged 66) Los Angeles, California
- Occupation: Missionary Reverend

Ira Haynes La Fetra (1851–1917), was a Methodist missionary to South America, and is commonly known as "builder of the Chile Mission". La Fetra was born on March 3, 1851 in Harveysburg, Ohio, the son of James Hubbard La Fetra and Sarah (Hormell) La Fetra He graduated from Boston University School of Theology

== Missionary work ==
To assist in his pioneering missionary efforts in Chile, La Fetra was invited by reverend William Taylor, who had already served as a missionary in several countries around the world. La fetra subsequently arrived at the port city of Valparaíso in 1878. Among La Fetra's first efforts involved preaching the Gospel to the many seamen there. The following year La Fetra began ministering in Santiago, where he reorganized the English-language Union Church and founded a school there in 1880. In Santiago La Fetra met and married Adelaide Whitefield (La Fetra), and together they founded the Santiago College, considered one of the leading educational schools in Chile. In 1880 he was elected as the first president of the conference of missionaries set up to administer the self-supporting missions that had been established by Taylor on the West Coast of South America. Due to iIll health La Fetra was forced to retire in 1906. In 1896, the Chile mission, came under the superintendency of Ira H. La Fetra, who was making evangelical inroads into a predominantly Roman Catholic Chile.

Over time La Fetra became very familiar with Chili, which led him to author a work entitled, Chili, which he had published in 1900 in Protestant Missions in South America. It was a comprehensive work about the government, politics, religion industry and geography and the people of Chili

La Fetra died on December 16, 1917 at age 66, in Los Angeles, California.

== See also ==
- List of bishops of the United Methodist Church
- List of Methodist theologians

== Sources ==
- Arms, Goodsil Filley (1921). History of the William Taylor self-supporting missions in South America. New York, &Cincinnati: The Methodist book concern.
- Barclay, Wade Crawford (1949). History of Methodist Missions. Vol. IV. The Board of Missions and Church Extension of the Methodist Church.
- La Fetra, Ira Haynes (1900). Protestant missions in South America: Chili. New York: Student volunteer movement for foreign missions.
- Taylor, William (1879). Our South American cousins. New York : Phillips & Hunt; London : Hodder and Stoughton.
- —— (1895). Ridpath, John (ed.). Story of my life. Toronto: W. Briggs.
