= Josué Smith Solar =

Chilean architect

- Born: December 8, 1867; San Nicolás, Chile
- Died: 1938 (aged 70–71); Santiago
- Education: Colegio Sagrados Corazones de Santiago de Chile
- Alma mater: Polytechnic College of Pennsylvania
- Occupation: Architect
- Spouse: Cecilia Miller
- Parent(s): Silas Baldwin Smith; Leonor Solar

Josué Smith Solar (December 8, 1867 – 1938) was a Chilean architect.

== Life and career ==
Josué Smith Solar was born in San Nicolás, Chile, son of American engineer Silas Baldwin Smith and Chilean citizen Leonor Solar Ojeda. Smith Solar studied in Chillán and at the Colegio de los Sagrados Corazones of Santiago. In 1885, he began to study architecture at the Polytechnic College of Pennsylvania, United States.

In 1889 he traveled to Europe and returned to the United States in 1891, where he opened an architectural firm in Wilmington, Delaware. In 1894 he moved with his wife Cecilia Celestine Miller to Chile, and they ultimately settled there. His son, José Smith Miller, worked with him in Chile.

== Architectural works ==
Smith's main works were the following:

- Gran Hotel de Papudo, 1911, Papudo
- Club Hípico de Santiago, 1921–1923, Santiago, Chile
- Universidad Técnica Federico Santa María, 1931, Valparaíso, Chile
- Hotel Carrera, Santiago de Chile
- Remodeling of the southern facade of the Palacio de La Moneda, Santiago de Chile
- Remodeling of the Museo Nacional de Historia Natural, Santiago de Chile.
- Ministerio de Hacienda Building, Santiago de Chile
- Santiago College, Sede Los Leones, 1929–1932, Chile
- Colegio Inglés para Señoritas (Currently Universidad Metropolitana de Ciencias para la Educación), 1925, Santiago de Chile.
- Remodeling of the Portal Fernández Concha, 1927–1933, Santiago de Chile.
- Puente del Arzobispo, 1929, Santiago de Chile.
- Teatro Municipal de Chillán, Chillán

=== Gallery ===
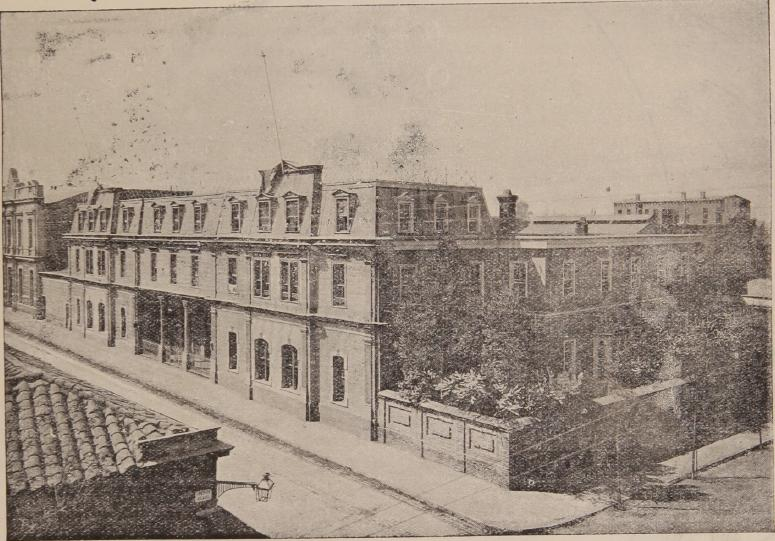
Santiago College School (Santiago, 1909)

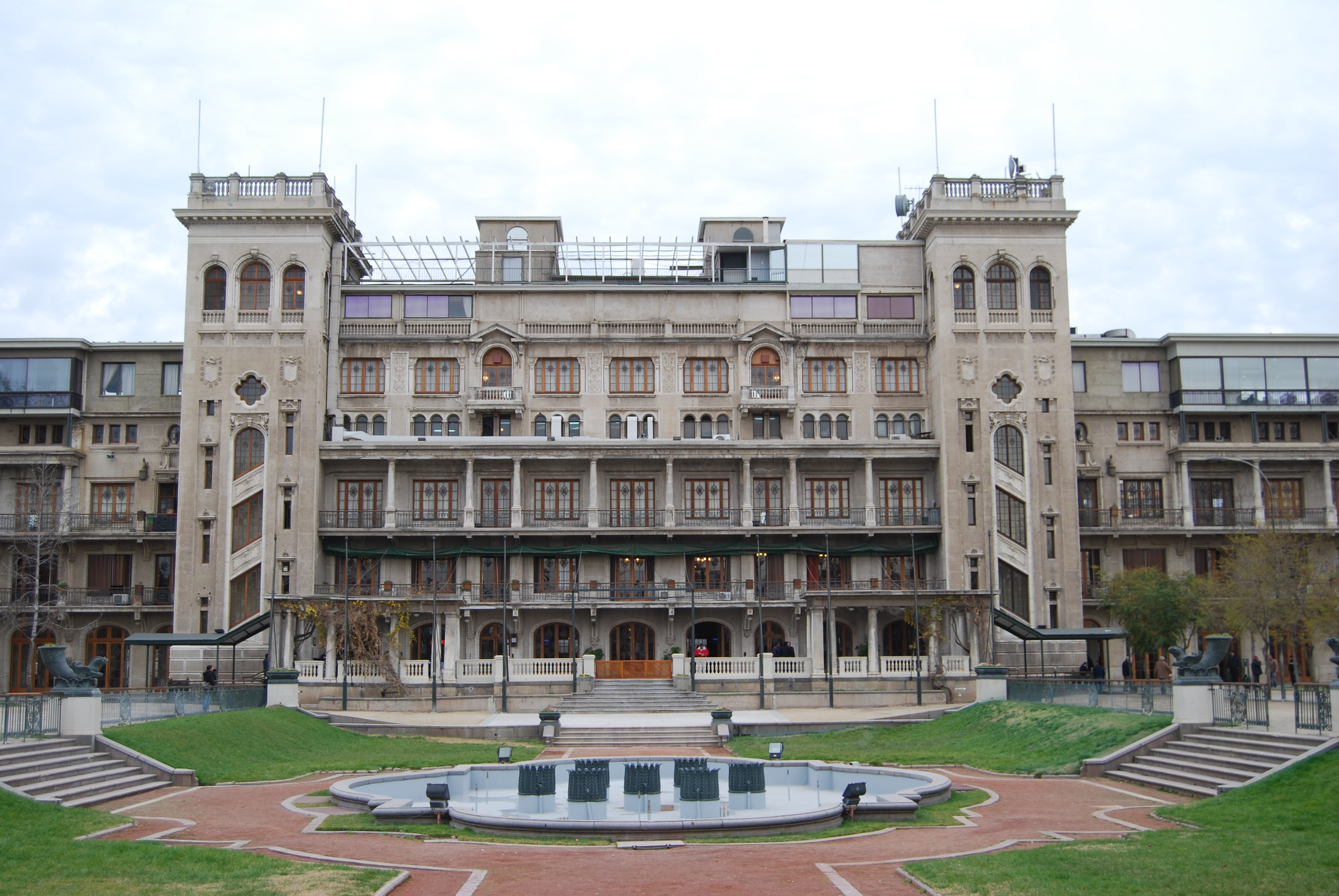
Club Hípico de Santiago (Santiago, 1921–1923)

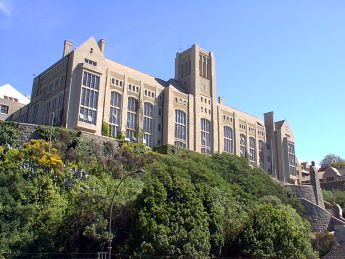
Universidad Técnica Federico Santa María (Valparaíso, 1931)

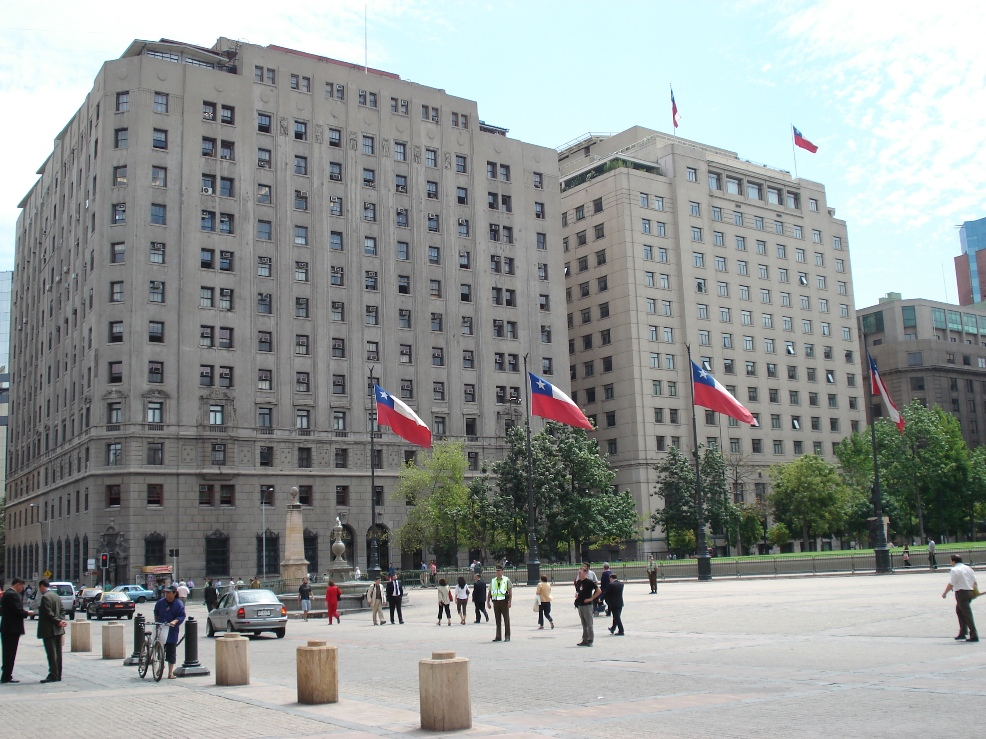
Ministerio de Hacienda de Chile (Santiago)

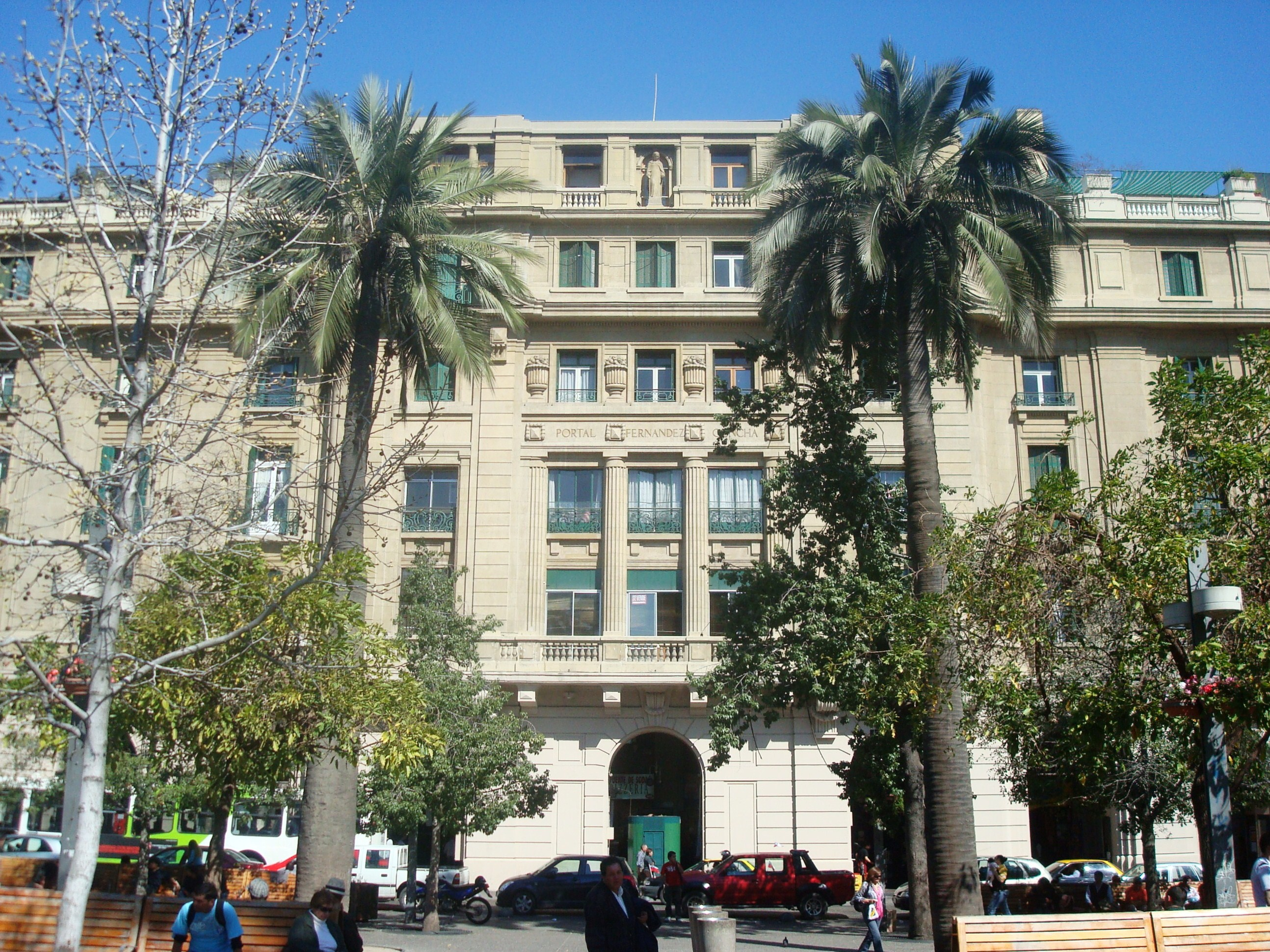
Portal Fernández Concha (Santiago, 1927–1933)

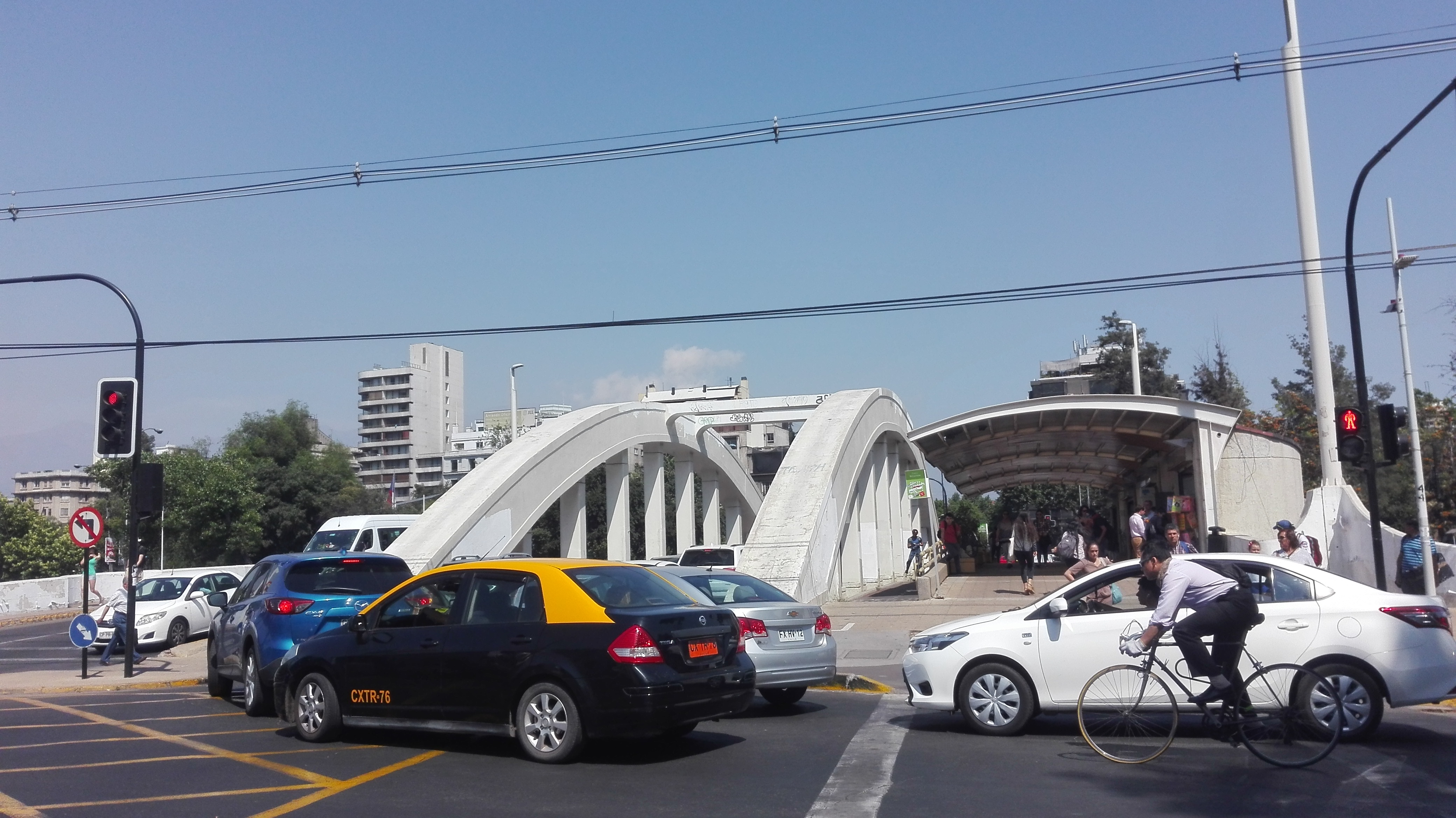
Puente del Arzobispo (Santiago, 1929)

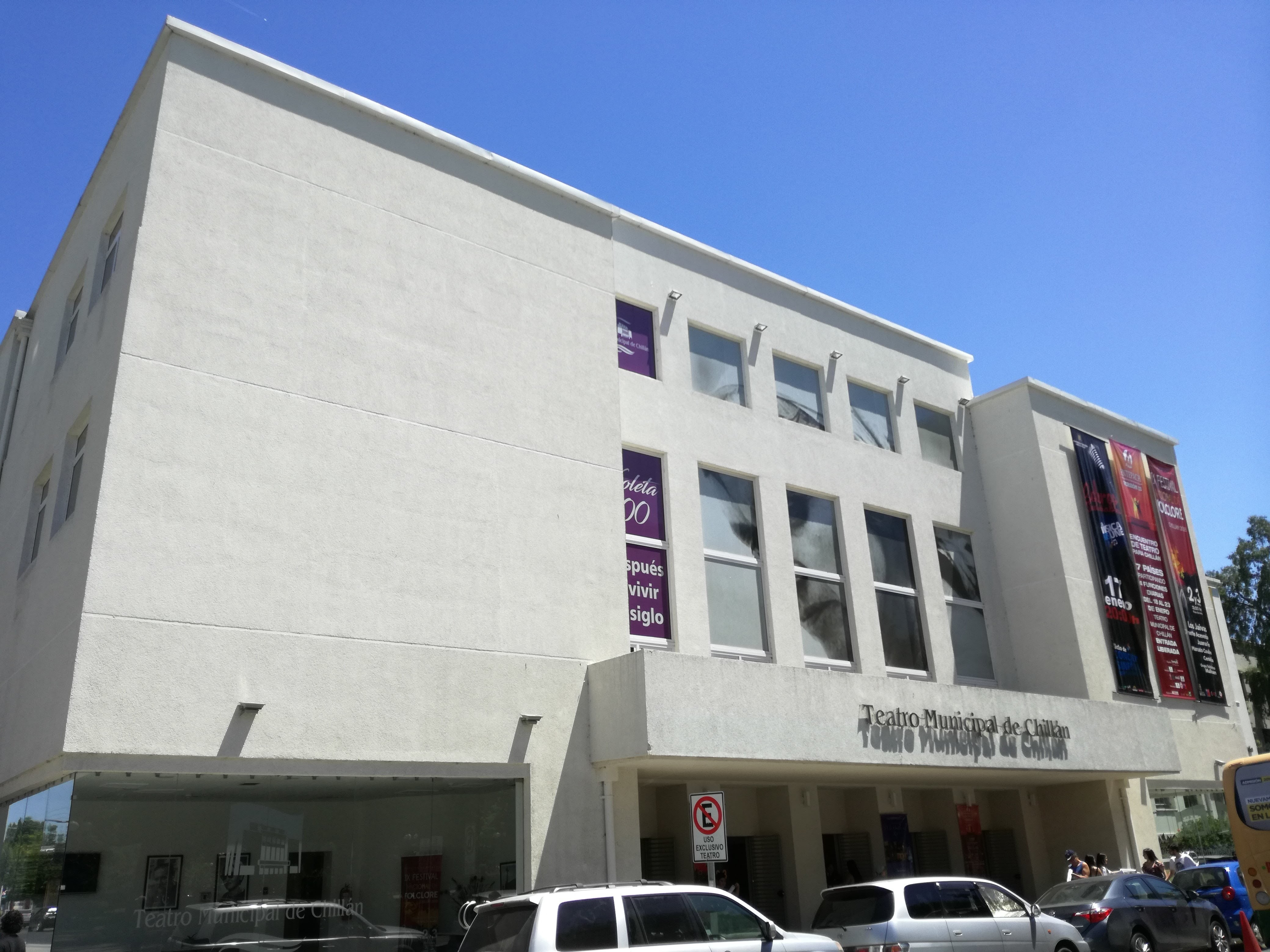
Teatro Municipal de Chillán (Chillán, 1940–1943, Completed in 2016)

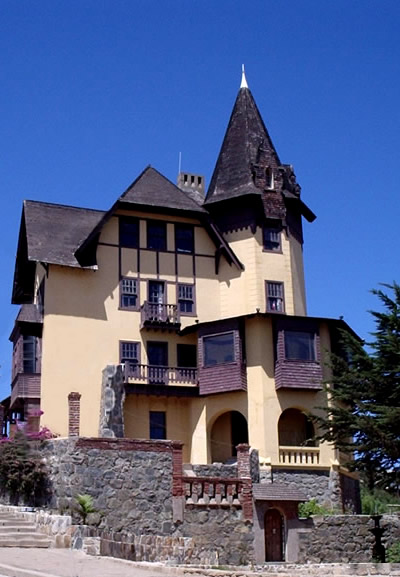
Chalet Recard (Papudo, 1912)

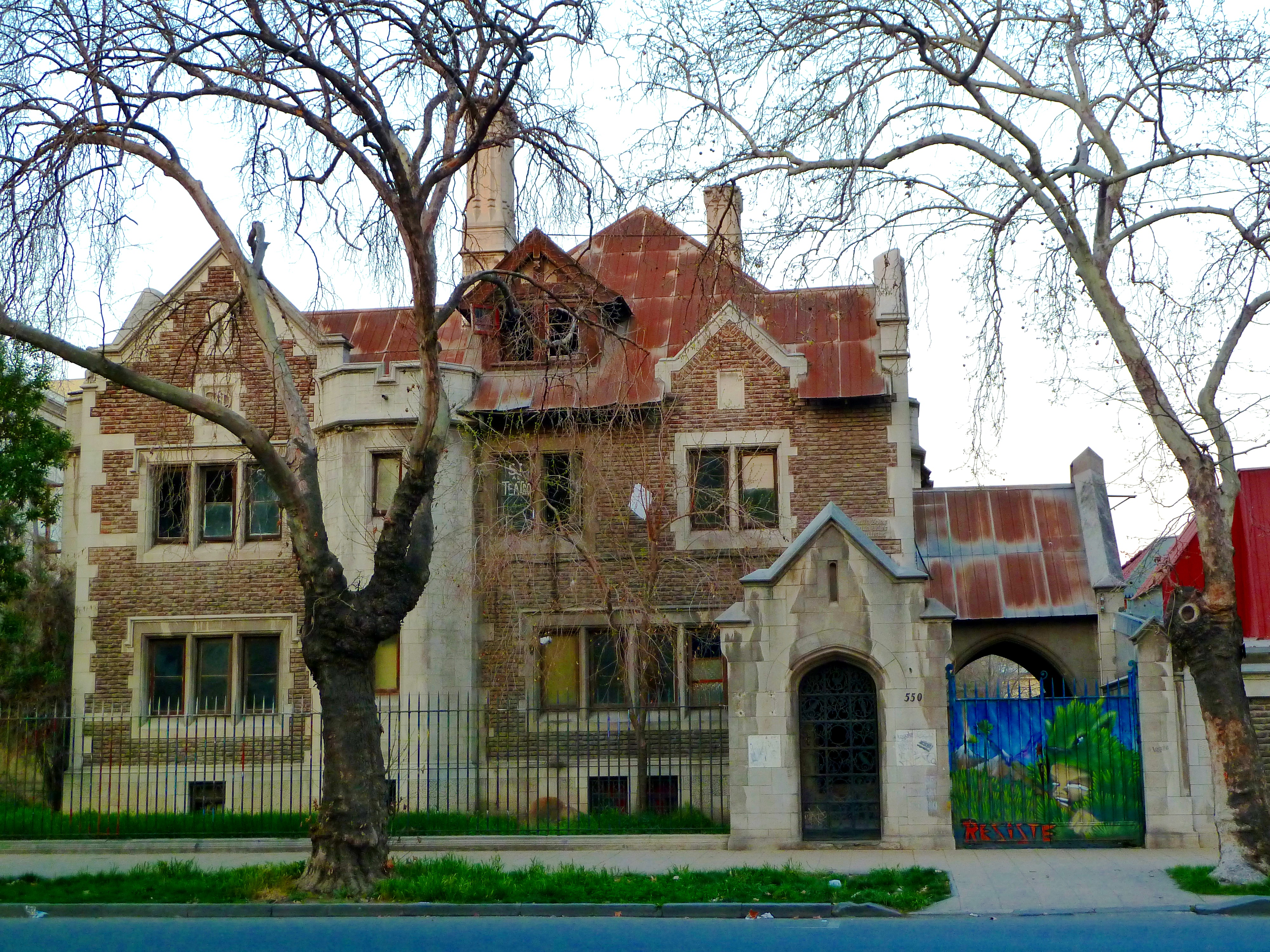
Residence of Josué Smith Solar in the Barrio República (Santiago)

== Bibliography ==
- Pérez de Arce, Mario (2010). "Smith Solar & Smith Miller, arquitectos" (in Spanish). Santiago: Universidad Finis Terrae.
