= Bill Loader =

Australian theologian

William Ronald George Loader (born 1944) is a minister of the Uniting Church in Australia and emeritus professor of New Testament at Murdoch University in Perth, Western Australia.

From 1978, Loader was New Testament lecturer at the Perth Theological Hall of the Uniting Church in Australia; from 1986, he was lecturer and later Professor of New Testament at Murdoch University (1998-2003 also as Head of the School of Social Inquiry).

Loader was the editor of Colloquium, the journal of the Australia and New Zealand Society for Theological Studies (ANZSTS), until 2005. He undertook a five-year Australian Research Council professorial fellowship on "Attitudes towards Sexuality in Judaism and Christianity in the Hellenistic Greco-Roman Era", 2005-2010.

Loader's academic degrees and qualifications are:

- BA (Auckl) - Bachelor of Arts (classics) (1966), University of Auckland, New Zealand
- Ministerial education (1964–1967) at Trinity Methodist Theological College, Auckland
- BD (Otago) - Bachelor of Divinity (1969), University of Otago, New Zealand
- Dr theol - Doctor of Theology (Johannes Gutenberg University of Mainz (1972), Mainz, Germany) - Supervisor: Ferdinand Hahn; Dissertation published in revised form in 1981: Sohn und Hoherpriester. Eine traditionsgeschichtliche Untersuchung zur Christologie des Hebräerbriefes, WMANT 53 (Neukirchen-Vluyn: Neukirchener Verlag, 1981)

== Books and publications ==
- Loader is perhaps best known to wider non-academic readership for his online book Dear Kim, This is what I believe: Explaining Christian Faith Today that is written in a style reminiscent of the Gospel of Mark and Acts in being actually or supposedly a letter to a person, but also for his recent research on sexuality in the ancient world
- Following Luke. A Commentary for People on the Road (Eugene: Wipf & Stock/Cascade, 2025)
- Following Matthew. A Commentary for People on the Road (Eugene: Wipf & Stock/Cascade, 2025)
- Facing Rejection. Responses in the New Testament Writings (Eugene: Wipf & Stock/Cascade, 2025)
- Following John. A Commentary for People on the Road (Eugene: Wipf & Stock, 2025)
- Following Mark. A Commentary for People on the Road (Eugene: Wipf & Stock, 2024)
- St Patrick and the Hellicopter: Theological Reflections and Stories for Young and Old (Eugene: Wipf & Stock, 2023)
- Myths on the Margins. Making it to the Centre (Eugene: Cascade Books, 2022)
- Sex, Then and Now. Sexualities and the Bible (Eugene: Cascade Books, 2022)
- Christology, Soteriology, and Ethics in John and Hebrews: Collected Essays, WUNT 478 (Tübingen: Mohr Siebeck, 2022)
- Jesus Left Loose Ends: Collected Essays (Adelaide: ATF, 2021)
- Sexuality and Gender: Collected essays, WUNT 458 (Tübingen: Mohr Siebeck, 2021)
- What Can Love Hope For? Questions for Faith Seeking Understanding (Eugene: Cascade Books, 2020)
- Two Views on Homosexuality, the Bible, and the Church, co-authored with Megan K. DeFranza, Wesley Hill, and Stephen R. Holmes (Counterpoints; ed. Preston Sprinkle (Grand Rapids: Zondervan, 2016))
- Jesus in John's Gospel: Structure and Issues in Johannine Christology (Grand Rapids: Eerdmans, 2017)
- Making Sense of Sex: Attitudes towards Sexuality in Early Jewish and Christian Literature (Grand Rapids: Eerdmans, 2011)
- The New Testament on Sexuality (Grand Rapids: Eerdmans, 2013)
- Philo, Josephus, and the Testaments on Sexuality: Attitudes towards Sexuality in the Writings of Philo, Josephus, and the Testaments of the Twelve Patriarchs (Grand Rapids: Eerdmans, 2011)
- The Pseudepigrapha on Sexuality: Attitudes towards Sexuality in Apocalypses, Testaments, Legends, Wisdom, and Related Literature (Grand Rapids: Eerdmans, 2011)
- Sexuality in the New Testament (London: SPCK, 2010)
- The Dead Sea Scrolls on Sexuality: Attitudes towards Sexuality in Sectarian and Related Literature at Qumran (Grand Rapids: Eerdmans, 2009)
- Enoch, Levi, and Jubilees on Sexuality: Attitudes Towards Sexuality in the Early Enoch Literature, the Aramaic Levi Document, and the Book of Jubilees (Grand Rapids: Eerdmans, 2007)
- The New Testament - with Imagination: A Fresh Approach to its Writings and Themes (Grand Rapids: Eerdmans, 2007)
- Sexuality and the Jesus Tradition (Grand Rapids: Eerdmans, 2005)
- "Same-Sex Relationships: A First Century Perspective" in HTS : Theological Studies Vol. 70 No. 1 (2014)
- The Septuagint, Sexuality and the New Testament: Case Studies on the Impact of the LXX in Philo and the New Testament (Grand Rapids: Eerdmans, 2004).
- Jesus' Attitude towards the Law. A Study of the Gospels (Grand Rapids: Eerdmans, 2002)
- Jesus and the Fundamentalism of his Day. The Gospels, the Bible and Jesus (Grand Rapids: Eerdmans, 2001; Melbourne: Uniting Education, 1998)
- Articles on Baptism: The Kiss of Baptism and Baptism in Context;
- "The Passion of the Christ" and the Passion of Jesus - a Reflection on Mel Gibson's film;
- Approaches to Scripture: Considering the Options;
- "Companions and Competitors" - and Context? on John P. Meier's, Marginal Jew: Vol 3;
- Simple Choices? on John Dominic Crossan's, The Birth of Christianity
- Lectionary Resources: First Thoughts on Gospel Passages from the Lectionary;
- Studies: Being the Church Then and Now: Issues from the Acts of the Apostles;
- Liturgical Resources and Reflections: The Presence of God; He made himself known in the breaking of the bread; Blessed are the Poor in Spirit; A Service of the Eucharist;

Loader also maintains a page for people seeking Bible study, commentary, sermon and prayer materials related to the Lectionary.

== Memberships and awards ==
- Studiorum Novi Testamenti Societas
- Catholic Biblical Association of America
- Catholic Biblical Association of Australia
- Society of Biblical Literature
- Fellow of the Australian Academy of the Humanities (FAHA)
- holder of an Australian Centenary Medal 'for services to Australian society and the humanities in the area of religion'

== See also ==
- List of Protestant authors
- List of Methodist theologians
