= Santiago College =

Coordinates: 33.423°S 70.603°W

Location
- Avenida Camino Los Trapenses 4007, Lo Barnechea, Santiago; Metropolitana; Santiajo, 7700951; Chile

Information
- Funding type: Private School
- Motto: La educación ennoblece (Education ennobles)
- Established: 1 October 1880 (145 years ago)
- Founders: Ira Haynes La Fetra & Adelaide W. La Fetra
- Grades: PreK - 12
- Gender: Coeducational
- Houses: Blue (Taylor), Yellow (Swaney), Red (La Fetra), Green (Mason)
- Colors: Royal blue, yellow
- Accreditation: NEASC
- Website: www.scollege.cl

Fundación Educacional Santiago College is a private educational (PK-12) institution in Santiago, Chile, founded in 1880. It was founded by American Methodist Ira Haynes La Fetra and his wife as a girls boarding school. In March 1972 the school became co-ed.

== School structure ==
The school follows both the Chilean national education curriculum and the International Baccalaureate (IB) Programme throughout all years. From Pre-Kinder to 8th grade, most classes are taught in English, with the exception of Spanish, Religion, Physical Education and Sports, and the Arts. In posterior years, most classes are taught in Spanish with exceptions like Business management and Environmental systems and societies.

The Chilean curriculum divides the school years in two sections: Enseñanza Básica (compulsory), currently composed from years 1–8 and Enseñanza Media, currently composed from years 9–12 (often stylised by the roman numerals I, II, III and IV; or sometimes IX, X, XI and XII).

The IB Programme is subdivided intro three sections:

The Primary Years Programme (PYP), taught from Pre-Kinder to 5th grade;

The Middle Years Programme (MYP), taught from 6th to 9th grade;

The Diploma Programme (Dip.), taught from 10th to 12th grade.

Although the school used to sit the IB Diploma exams during the November season, as of 2022 students sit the exams in May. Although this causes a slight misalignment with the traditional Chilean academic year (which start in March and ends in December, instead of starting in September and ending in June), the change was done to avoid potential conflicts with the Chilean university admission exams (PAES), which are sat in early December.

== Campus ==
Throughout its history, the school's main campus has been located at 5 different addresses:

- 17 Vergara Street (1880–1881)
- 219 Alameda de las Delicias (1882–1886)
- 2050 Agustinas Street (1887–1932)
- 2465 Lota Street (1933–2011)
- 4007 Camino Los Trapenses Avenue (2012–present)

The school was originally located at 17 Vergara Street in downtown Santiago, and in the following years it moved into various, increasingly larger locations to accommodate the arrival of new students. The 'Los Leones' campus that was built in Providencia in 1930 housed the school until 2012, when Santiago College moved to Los Trapenses in Lo Barnechea, an upper-class neighborhood at the outskirts of Santiago.

There are still monuments in honour of important school figures near the 'Los Leones' campus (which is now leased from the school by San Sebastián University). One of these is Adelaida La Fetra street, which honours the school's foundress. It is located between Los Leones avenue and Josué Smith Solar street, the latter of which is itself named after the school's architect. Plazuela Elizabeth Mason honours one of the school's headmistresses. It is a small square with a garden located in Los Nogales street, between Carlos Antúnez and Las Hortensias Street. Furthermore, La Fetra Street, near 2050 Agustinas Street, honours the school's founders at the location where the school once stood.

== Headteachers ==
- Ira Haynes La Fetra and Adelaide W. La Fetra (1880–1922)
- Mary F. Swaney (1923–1932)
- Elizabeth Mason (1933–1959)
- Larry Jackson (1960–1964)
- Elizabeth A. Grey (1964–1968)
- Jean Black de Cornejo (1969–1970)
- Gary Fritz (1970–1972)
- Maureen C. de Venegas (1972–1974)
- Adriana P. de Fuenzalida (1975–1978)
- Rebecca Donoso (1979–1990)
- Elizabeth Fox (1991–1999)
- Alun Copper (2000–2002)
- Lorna Prado Scott (2003–2024)
- Alan Lorenzini (2025- Present)

== Notable alumni ==
- Álex Anwandter - Singer-songwriter, musician, and film and music video director. Lead vocalist for the band Teleradio Donoso.
- Ken Balough - Video Game Professional and Spokesperson for LucasArts, SEGA, Sony PlayStation, and Microsoft Xbox.
- Cecilia Bolocco - Miss Universe 1987
- Lorenza Izzo - Actress
- Olga Lehmann - Visual artist
- Marcelo Ríos - Tennis Player and ATP Top 1 in 1998
- Denise Rosenthal - Singer and actor in El Blog de Feña
- Nano Stern - Musician and composer
