= Edificio José Miguel Carrera =

Coordinates: 33.441501°S 70.6552°W

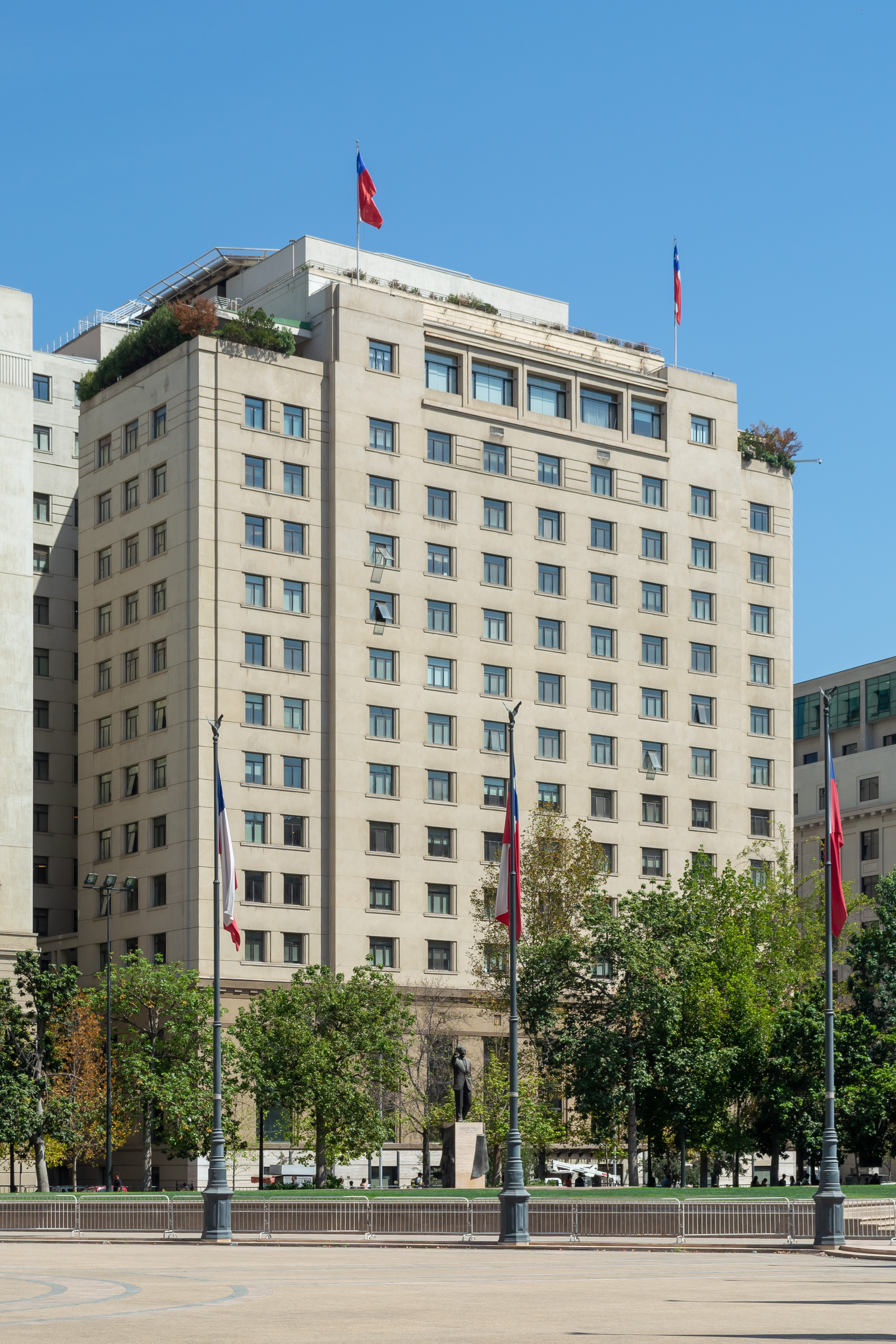
- Interactive map of Edificio José Miguel Carrera

General information
- Location: 180 Teatinos Street, Chile

Design and construction
- Architects: Josué Smith Solar; José Smith Miller

The Edificio José Miguel Carrera is the headquarters of the Ministerio de Relaciones Exteriores of Chile, located in the Civic District of Santiago, facing the Plaza de la Constitución. It was formerly the historic Hotel Carrera, until 2004.

== History ==
The Hotel Carrera was named for Chilean founder José Miguel Carrera and was designed in the Art Deco style by architects Josué Smith Solar and José Smith Miller, as part of the creation of a Civic District centered around La Moneda Palace. Opened in 1940, it was one of the first multi-story buildings constructed from reinforced concrete in Chile. The 17-story hotel had two basement levels and a rooftop swimming pool. Its famous guests included Queen Elizabeth II and Pope John Paul II.

Intercontinental Hotels managed the hotel from January 1, 1950 to 1960. Hilton Hotels leased the hotel on January 1, 1961, and it became their first property in South America. Sheraton Hotels assumed management of the property in 1969, and operated it until 1978 as the Carerra-Sheraton Hotel.

During the 1973 Chilean coup d'état, the hotel's terrace roof and its windows were used by foreign journalists to record the bombing of La Moneda Palace. Much of the 1982 film Missing is set in the hotel during this time, through the movie was actually filmed in Mexico City, with the Gran Hotel Ciudad de México standing in as the Carrera's interior and the Hotel Fiesta Americana Reforma standing in as its exterior.

The hotel closed permanently in 2004. The structure was remodeled and reopened in 2005 as an office building, renamed Edificio José Miguel Carrera, housing the headquarters of the Ministry of Foreign Affairs of Chile.
