= Henry Reed Taylor =

American ornithologist

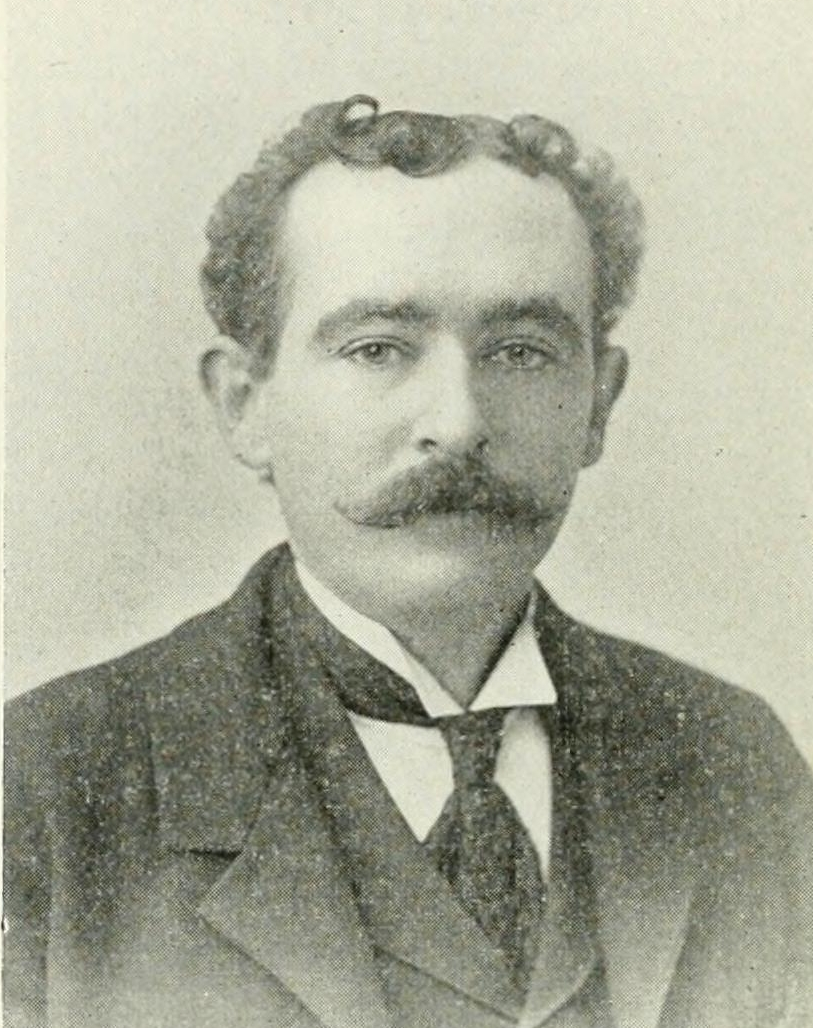

Henry Reed Taylor (6 October 1866 – 23 September 1917) was an American ornithologist from Alameda, California. He founded and edited the magazine Nidiologist from 1893 to 1897.

Taylor was born in Cape Town to Methodist Bishop William Taylor and Isabella A. née Kimberlin. He grew up in Alameda where he began to collect birds eggs from a young age. His mother had enquired with Robert Ridgway about career options for her twenty year old son. Ridgway suggested that he find a career to support his hobby. Taylor worked at a San Francisco newspaper but spent most of his spare time observing birds in California. He founded the California Ornithological Club in 1889 and was a member and later president of the Cooper Ornithological Club. He collected eggs and conducted the magazine Nidiologist (later called the Nidologist) that he founded in 1893 as part of the Cooper Ornithological Club. Several of the club meetings were held at his home on 1375 Regent street, Alameda. He became a patient at a sanatorium following the 1906 earthquake and died eleven years later at Agnewo.
