= Portal Fernández Concha =

Historic building in Santiago, Chile

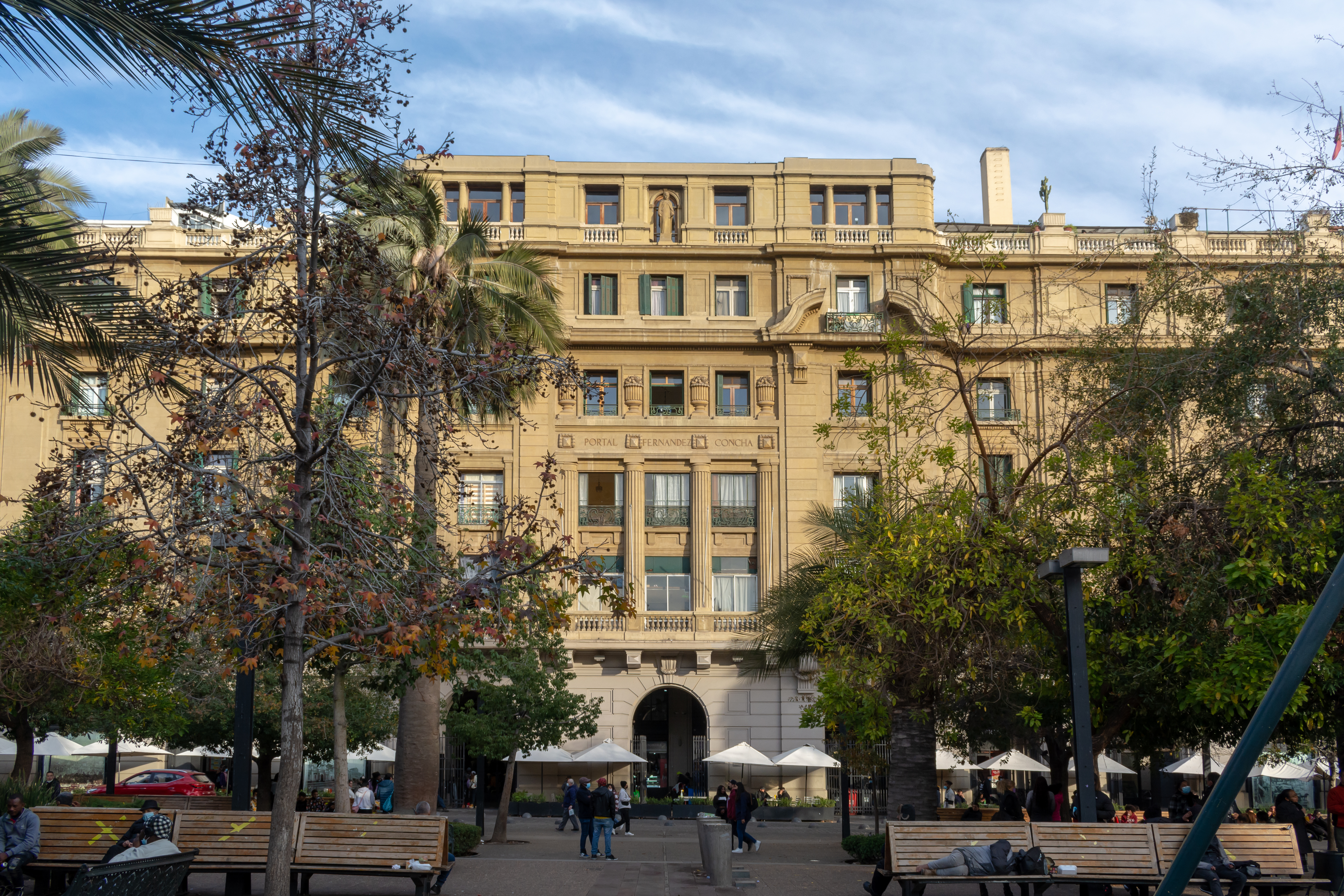
- Interactive map of the Portal Fernández Concha area

General information
- Architectural style: Neoclassical
- Location: Plaza de Armas, Santiago, Chile
- Coordinates: 33°26′18.7″S 70°39′01.24″W
- Completed: 1871
- Renovated: 1928

Technical details
- Floor count: 7 (after renovation)

Design and construction
- Architects: W. Hovender Hendry, Lucien Hénault; Josué Smith Solar, José Smith Miller (renovation)
- Designations: National Monument of Chile

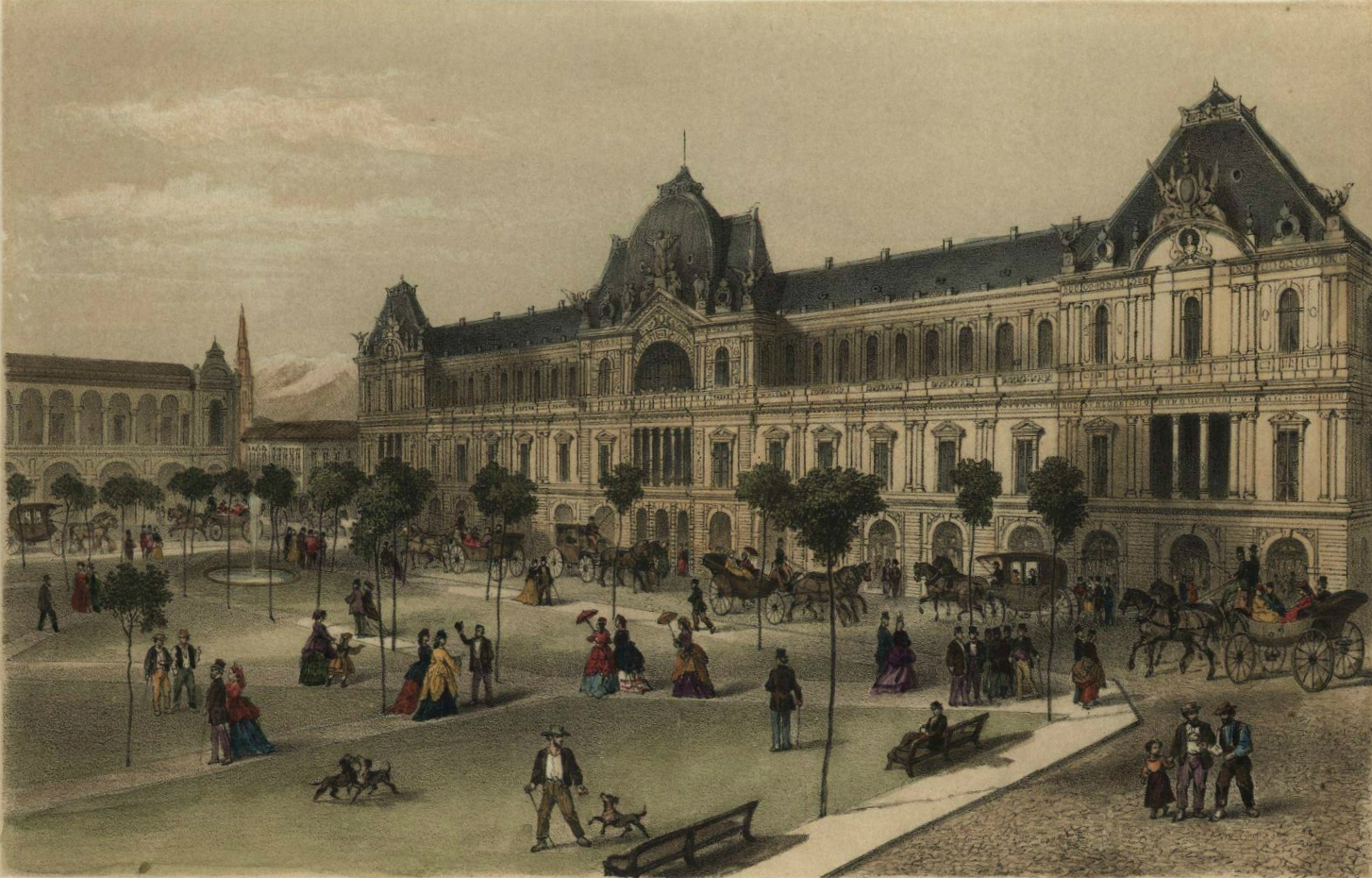
Portal Fernández Concha and the Plaza de Armas in 1872

Portal Fernández Concha is a historic mixed-use building in Santiago, Chile. Built in 1871 as a commercial building including a hotel, it forms the south side of the central Plaza de Armas. It was registered on 3 December 1986 as a national monument as part of the zona típica consisting of the square, the former National Congress building and nearby buildings.

== Building ==
The Portal Fernández Concha is a seven-storey Neoclassical building with an arcaded ground floor housing shops and restaurants. It forms the south side of the Plaza de Armas; the Portal Bulnes, on the east side, is also a commercial building.

== History ==
The building was erected in 1871 as a replacement for the Portal Sierra Bella, which had been destroyed by fire. The brothers Pedro and Domingo Fernández Concha provided part of the financing. The design, by the British architect W. Hovender Hendry, was Beaux Arts, reminiscent of buildings in Paris and London; a shopping arcade that runs through the ground floor, the Pasaje Matte, is by the French architect Lucien Hénault. (Note: Bastoen credits the entire building to Hénault, with Hendry as constructing architect.)

In its original form, the Portal Fernández Concha had three storeys in addition to extensive underground vaults. The façade had turrets in the centre and at both ends. A hotel was located on the upper floors: at its opening as the Hotel Santiago, it was the premier hotel in South America, and had furniture imported from Europe. The hotel became the Gran Hotel Inglés in 1884 and the Gran Hotel de Francia in 1900. In 1919 it was again renamed to the Hotel Plaza, and the Hotel Milán opened separately in part of the premises. The Pasaje Matte, whose shops were originally almost entirely French, and the adjacent Pasaje Bulnes were among the most fashionable retail centres in 19th-century Santiago. Electric lighting was installed in the building in 1882, one of the first installations in the city.

In 1928 the building was extensively remodelled by the Chilean architects Josué Smith Solar and his son José Smith Miller. Its height was increased to seven storeys plus an attic, and the façade was simplified. Art Deco elements were added to the interior. A statue of the Virgin Mary by Domingo García Huidobro was placed at the top centre of the façade.

The organisation which established the Santiago Stock Exchange was founded in 1870 and had its offices in the Portal Fernández Concha. Radio del Pacífico, renamed in 1938 from Radio La Chilena Consolidada, operated from the building for more than thirty years.

Starting in the 1940s, the upper floors were subdivided into both residential and commercial spaces, and the building acquired a reputation first for Bohemianism and later for illegal enterprises. In 2023 the National Congress passed a motion calling for the expropriation of the Portal Fernández Concha as a public nuisance. The contemporary art gallery Espacio218 opened in 2022 in an apartment in the building. The ground floor remains commercial, but the original restaurants serving European cuisine have given way to fast food. One restaurant, Chez Henry, operated there from 1925 until its closure in 2003.
