= William Taylor (missionary) =

American Missionary Bishop

- Minister from 1847–1889; Bishop from 1889–1896
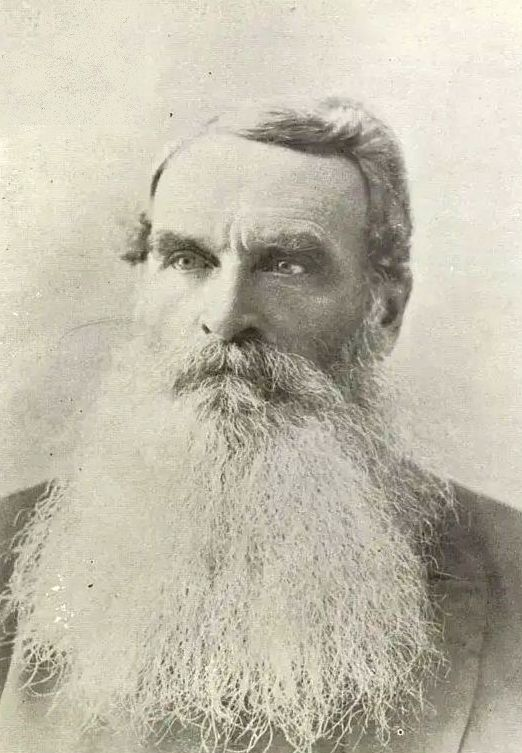
- William Taylor, 1890
- Church: Methodist Episcopal Church

Orders
- Ordination: 1847
- Consecration: 1889 by Methodist Episcopal General Conference

Personal details
- Born: May 2, 1821 Rockbridge County, Virginia, U.S.
- Died: May 19, 1902 (aged 81) Palo Alto, California
- Buried: Mountain View Cemetery, Oakland, California
- Denomination: Methodist
- Spouse: Isabelle Anne Kimberlin (m. 1864–1902) (Note: Taylor refers to her as "Annie")
- Children: 4
- Profession: Missionary, Reverend, Bishop, author
- Known for: Establishing self-supporting missions around the world
- Notable work: See bibliography

Signature
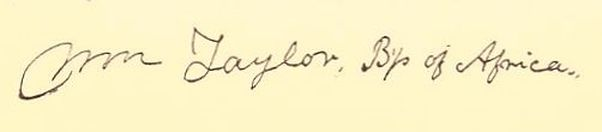

William Taylor (1821–1902) was an American Methodist missionary minister, who in 1884 was elected by the Methodist General Conference as bishop over the Methodist missions in Africa for the Methodist Episcopal Church. Taylor spent most of his adult life performing missionary work around the world. He began his missionary service when he was assigned by the Conference to establish missions in California and provide services in San Francisco during the California gold rush of 1849. His other missionary work involved the establishment of self-supporting missions in various countries about the world, bringing him to England, Ireland, India, South America, Australia, New Zealand and Africa, all of which he wrote about in a number of publications. After many years serving as a Methodist missionary Taylor was elected Bishop of Africa. He has received acclaim and is noted for introducing Methodism through his missionary efforts to several countries around the world. Taylor is also credited for introducing the eucalyptus tree to California with seeds he gathered while serving as a missionary in Australia.

== Family background ==
Taylor was born May 2, 1821, in the Blue Ridge Mountains of Virginia in Rockbridge County. (Note: Rockbridge County was home to Sam Houston (born 1796), Robert E. Lee (born 1807), and Stonewall Jackson (born 1824)) in the Commonwealth of Virginia. William was the oldest of five sons and six daughters, born to Stuart Taylor and Martha Hickman. In his autobiography, Story of My Life (1896), Taylor describes his grandfather, James, as one of five brothers who were "Scotch-Irish of the Old Covenantor type" who emigrated from County Armagh, Ireland, to the colony of Virginia, about one hundred and thirty years ago" (i.e. 1766). The Hickman family was of English ancestry and settled in Delaware in the late 1750s. Both families "fought for American freedom in the Revolution of 1776", and afterward emancipated their slaves. (Note: Commonly referred to as servants in those days.) Taylor’s father, Stuart, was a "tanner and currier—a considered a mechanical genius of his times"; his mother was "mistress of the manufacture of all kinds of cloth". Both parents, he says, were of "powerful constitution of body and mind…their English school education quite equal to the average of their day". Taylor married Isabelle Anne Kimberlin on October 21, 1846 after waiting an mutually agreed upon arrangement that he would serve the church for four years. Taylor had two sons and two daughters, Morgan Stuart, Oceana, William Jr., and Charles Reid. Only Morgan lived to see adulthood.

== Conversion to Christ ==
Before William was ten years old, his grandmother had taught him the Lord's Prayer and explained that he could become a son of God. At age ten he longed for this relationship, but was unsure how to obtain it, during which time he underwent a "profound religious experience", which was affirmed for him in 1841 at the age of twenty. After overhearing the story of a poor Black man who had received salvation, he wondered why he could not, also. He recounts in his autobiography,

"soon after, as I sat one night by the kitchen fire, the Spirit of the Lord came on me and I found myself suddenly weeping aloud and confessing my sins to God in detail, as I could recall them, and begged Him for Jesus' sake to forgive them, with all I could not remember; and I found myself trusting in Jesus that it would all be so, and in a few minutes my heart was filled with peace and love, not the shadow of a doubt remaining."

So inspired, the young Taylor entered the Baltimore Annual Conference in 1843.

== Missionary work ==
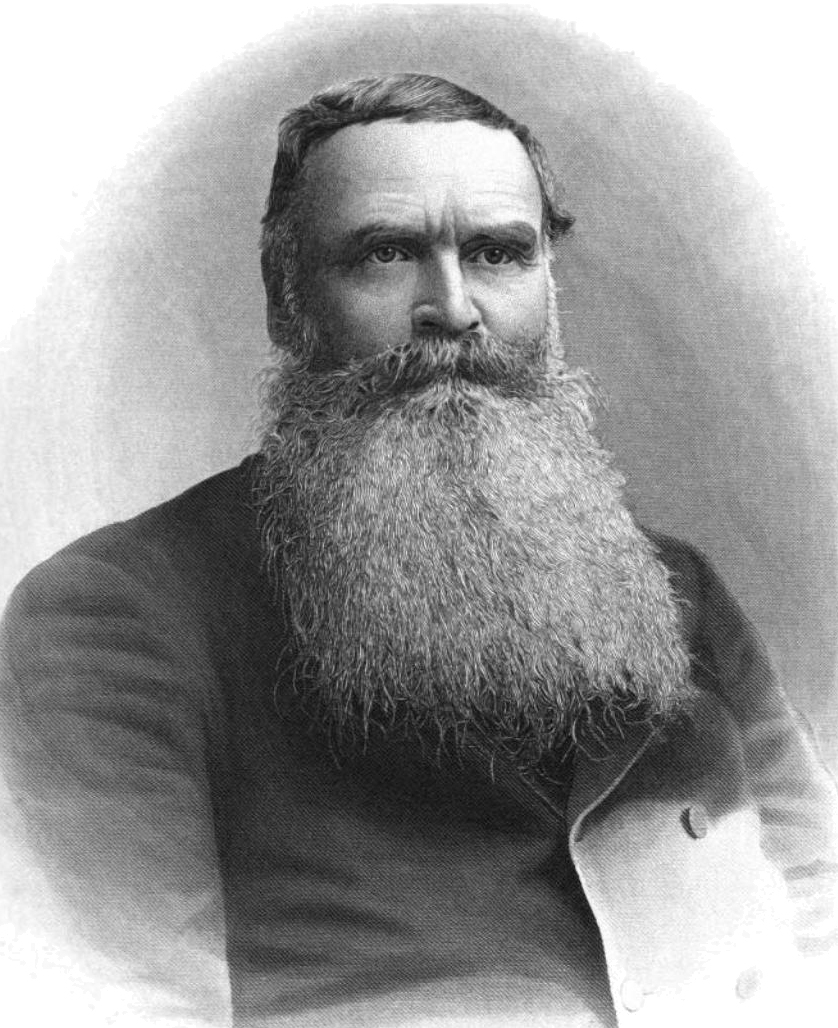
William Taylor

Between 1849 and 1883, Taylor traveled and became involved in many parts of the world as an evangelist missionary. His extensive missionary travels included Australia and South Africa (1863-1866); England, the West Indies, British Guiana, and Ceylon (1866-1870); India (1870-1875); South America (1875-1884); and Liberia, Angola, the Congo, Australia and Mozambique, a global involvement unmatched by no other during his time (1885-1896). Taylor was committed to bringing salvation to those he deemed were in need of it, and to this end he wrote a work, entitled, Reconciliation, or, How to be saved, which he had first published in 1867. To assist other preachers in this effort he also wrote the work, The Best Mode of Preaching the Gospel, published in 1859.

=== California ===
Taylor's missionary career began in San Francisco, California in September 1849, the year after gold was discovered at Sutter's Mill, resulting in the California gold rush. Due to the thousands of people flooding into California the Methodist General Conference (Note: The General Conference is the supreme legislative body in the Methodist Church, and assumed such authority by general consent in 1792.) deemed it necessary to send missionaries there to provide social work and religious services. The first sent for this undertaking were Reverends William Taylor and Isaac Owen. When Taylor arrived, and with no chapel for people to gather in and listen to sermons, Taylor preached the gospel in the streets to settlers, prospectors, Native Americans, Chinese immigrants, and to the sick and the poor, without receiving any salary. He subsequently came to be known as "California Taylor" throughout his missionary career. In October 1849 Taylor acquired a lot next to the home of Reverend Hatler on Jackson Street who invited him and advanced him the money at no interest to build his own house. Thriving congregations also emerged at Sacramento, San Jose, Stockton, and Santa Cruz while the Gospel was also preached in many of the mining camps. As the immigration increased so did the numbers in the congregations.

Before Taylor was able to set out for California, all the routes to California became flooded with prospectors and adventurers. Not wanting to subject his newly wed and expecting wife to the risks of Indian attack while crossing the plains, or sailing to Panama at the risk of contracting yellow fever by crossing the Isthmus, Taylor got the last berths on the Andalusia, a ship headed for San Francisco by going around Cape Horn at the tip of South America. About one hundred and fifty days into the voyage Taylor's wife gave birth to a daughter on June 8, 1849, who they named Oceana, while they were going around the cape, and who only lived to be about a year old. Their ship, Captain Wilson at the helm, had arrived in the midst of a thick fog and so he cautiously landed just north of the Golden Gate. During the voyage they had experienced incidents of damage to the rigging and sails due to high winds, which the captain was able to remedy en route, without have to stop at any port. Having been informed about the very high cost of food in San Francisco due to the gold rush, the Taylors brought a year's supply of food along with them. As the rents for housing accommodations were also abnormally high, Taylor and his wife found lodging with another Methodist minister who gave them the first month's rent free. Having logging experience, he crossed the bay north to the redwood forests and acquired his own timber in which he used to erect his own house, in less than a month.

Taylor described young San Francisco at this time as a "city of tents". Because of poor living conditions and the scarcity of good food, many took sick with scurvy, tuberculosis or Asiatic cholera, often resulting in death. Here Taylor spent much of his time giving aid and words of encouragement and prayer to those afflicted. The main square had many gambling hotels, where Taylor would spend time outside preaching in the streets about the vices of gambling and drinking, which was, to the amazement of some, often well received by the patrons of those establishments.

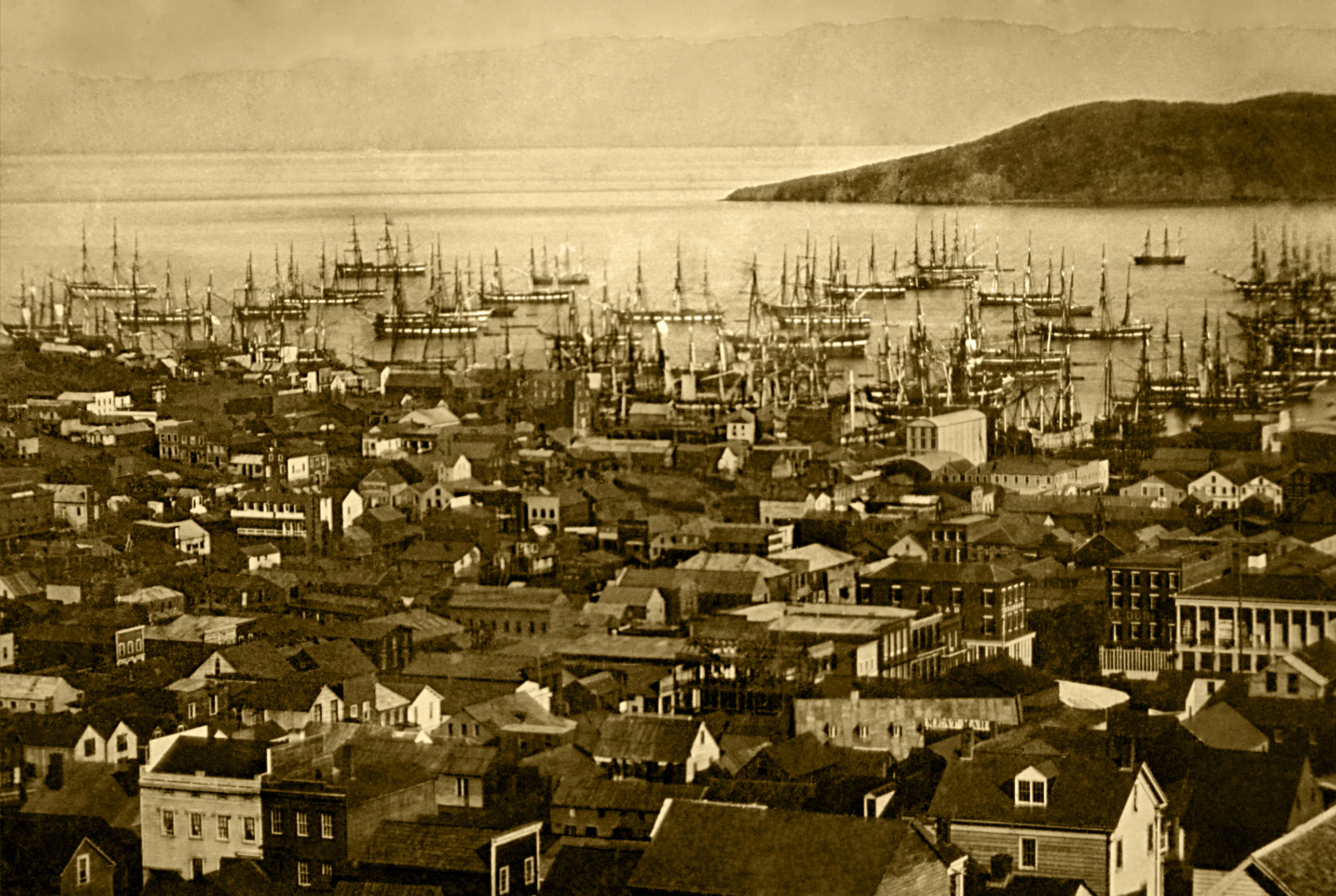
San Francisco and its harbor in 1851

Taylor had preached hundreds of sermons in the streets of San Francisco, and would sometimes take up a collection which he saved and used to build a Bethel Chapel in 1851. Sometimes various miners, who appreciated Taylor's service, donated generously. Before securing a permanent location for the Bethel, Taylor had converted an abandoned ship, the Panama, one of the numerous other ships abandoned in the San Francisco Bay, as a “Seamen’s Bethel Church", which was soon well attended. (Note: In 1855, “‘Frisco’s Father Taylor” was succeeded by George E. Davis, a ship’s mate, who journeyed to California seeking gold, but instead "found a Savior’’, became a Baptist minister, and built a Bethel on the Clark Street water front.) While the building of the permanent Bethel was well in progress it was destroyed during the great San Francisco Fire of 1851, and with the prospect for it to pay off loans Taylor found himself in debt.

Taylor persevered, however, and with the financial aid of those appreciative of his dedication and continued services, he acquired the necessary funds to rebuild. In the process he had organized the first Methodist church in San Francisco, (Note: William M. Roberts in 1847 had already introduced Methodism in San Francisco by organizing a Sunday school, on his way to the Methodist Mission in Oregon. It was disbanded in April, 1847, during the initial calamity caused by the gold rush.) while also establishing the first hospital in California. Taylor also had prepared at Baltimore the basic materials of a church, which he had shipped by sea, that were used to construct the first Methodist edifice in Sacramento.

There were several other preachers in San Francisco at the time but, “Father Taylor,” as he was commonly referred to, was the best-known preacher, because, among his other efforts, he often went out of his way to find the people who needed his service and console. When Taylor came down with a rare sickness he was confined to his bed for awhile, and soon discovered he had an ability for writing, as, after seven years in San Francisco, he had much to write about. Here he produced his first work, Seven Years of Street Preaching in San Francisco, which was published in 1856. While in California he had accumulated a debt trying to expand his ministry with sailors in San Francisco, which he was able to pay back through the sales of his book, Seven years' street preaching in San Francisco, California, published in 1856. This work made him a popular revivalist in north-eastern and mid-western cities. Taylor was so impressed with the overall California landscape, he once stated in his work, California life illustrated, 1858, "The Lord has lavished more beauty on California than upon any spot I have ever seen."

=== Eastern United States and Canada ===
At the end of seven years of missionary service in California Taylor aspired to the idea of being an itinerant preacher. After being granted a leave of absence from the General Conference he traveled through the United States for a brief period, preaching wherever the opportunity presented itself. He spent three months in Philadelphia, during the summer of 1857, preaching in all the main Methodist churches in that city. During autumn of 1857 Taylor visited New England for the first time and attended the New Market Camp Meeting, in New Hampshire. Thereafter he visited Boston and sat in preaching at the church of Reverend Edward Taylor. (Note: Highly regarded by seamen for his "Seaman's chapel" and as an outspoken opponent to the practice of shanghaiing) At the beginning of 1861 just before the Civil War broke out, he went to Canada and spent a year on a line of work where he preached and offered services at nine camp meetings for the next four years, where he was often favorably received. Though Taylor's time in Canada was short lived he used his connections and time there to expand his religious-social network to include people from the British Methodist realm.

=== England ===
In February 1862, Taylor was informed about the rising colonies in Australia from Dr. James Brown who had previously lived in that colony. Brown informed him that they were in great need of a clergy such as Taylor could provide. So inspired, Taylor left Canada by way of Sandy Hook on May 1, 1862, aboard the steamship Kangaroo first stopping for a term in Liverpool. Without much delay he went directly from Liverpool to the Wesleyan Conference, then in session at Camborne, Cornwall, and put up at a hotel. Upon arrival to the Conference he submitted letters of introduction addressed to Reverend William Arthur, Dr. Prest, president of the Conference, along with other distinguished members, and subsequently was cordially received. At the Conference he listened to an oration from William Punshon. While the Conference was in session, lasting several days, Taylor was invited to preach at the chapel on three occasions. He also once preached on the street, and once to the miners a thousand feet down in Dalcoath Mine. After the Conference Taylor visited Drogheda, Ireland, accompanied by Reverend William Crook and preached a week in his church. Taylor spent a total of eleven months visiting England and Ireland.

Believing that there was much "misapprehension of the principal facts and issues of the American war" among the people of Britain, Taylor was compelled to author a 32 page royal octavo pamphlet entitled Cause and Probable Results of the Civil War in America - Facts for the People of Great Britain, which he had published in London in 1862 The pamphlet was received with mixed editorial reviews among the various newspapers in England. Various reverends and the Quakers in particular, discussed and circulated the pamphlet among their congregations. Taylor made no attempt to sell his pamphlet, but instead put together a long list of names of lords, ministers, and people of all classes, and sent out 11,000 copies for free distribution. Some years later President Rutherford B. Hayes praised Taylor's effort, saying that the pamphlet was worth more to the American Union than a regiment of soldiers at the front.

=== Australia ===
Taylor had been encouraged by Reverend James Brown of Canada in 1861 to venture to Australia and look into the possibility of doing missionary work in that country. After further consideration Taylor set out for Australia In the spring of 1863, first making an extensive tour in Paris, Sicily and other points around the Mediterranean Sea. After a week long visit to Paris he boarded a steamer, the Massageries Imperialias, and made his way to Beirut and then Palermo, in Sicily. From there his ship proceeded through the Greek Isles in the Aegean Sea, stopping at the island of Syra, for a few days. Accompanied by a dragoman Taylor's company made additional stops at Sidon, and Sarepta, then proceeded to Tyre. They arrived at the ancient city of Acre and while there ascended Mount Carmel, then spent time visiting Jerusalem.

By early spring of 1863 at Suez Taylor's company boarded the steamer Mooltan, of the Penin sula and Oriental line of steamers.The cost of the fare from Suez to Melbourne, Australia, was one hundred and twenty pounds. When they reached Ceylon (Note: Ceylon was the historical name. Today the Island is called Sri Lanka.) the passengers bound for Australia were transferred to a smaller vessel, the Mooltan, upon reaching Australia their first stop was at Albany. From there Taylor made his way to Melbourne, with but two dollars and fifty cents to his name, with no letter of credit from anyone. Upon his arrival to Australia, Taylor was further encouraged by a Baptist missionary to make an evangelistic tour of the country. Subsequently Taylor became the principal figure in that area. His missionary work commenced in Melbourne, in the beginning of May, 1863. For the next three years Taylor served in Australia, also venturing to Tasmania, and New Zealand, where he recruited thousands to the membership of the Wesleyan Methodist churches. He was known already through his books, and was warmly received by the Wesleyan ministers from England. During all this time he secured support for himself and family from the books he had published. In Melbourne, Taylor raised the funding needed to build ten chapels on plots of land granted to the church by the Australian government. Throughout the continent he helped to add more than twenty thousand people to the Methodist congregations.

In 1863 Taylor collected seeds of the eucalyptus tree and sent them to his wife and a horticulturist in California who both successfully cultivated them, thus introducing the eucalyptus tree to the Pacific Coast. He had spent a total of seven months in England and Ireland and was well received at every place he visited, but he longed to make his way for Australia and begin missionary work there.

=== South Africa ===
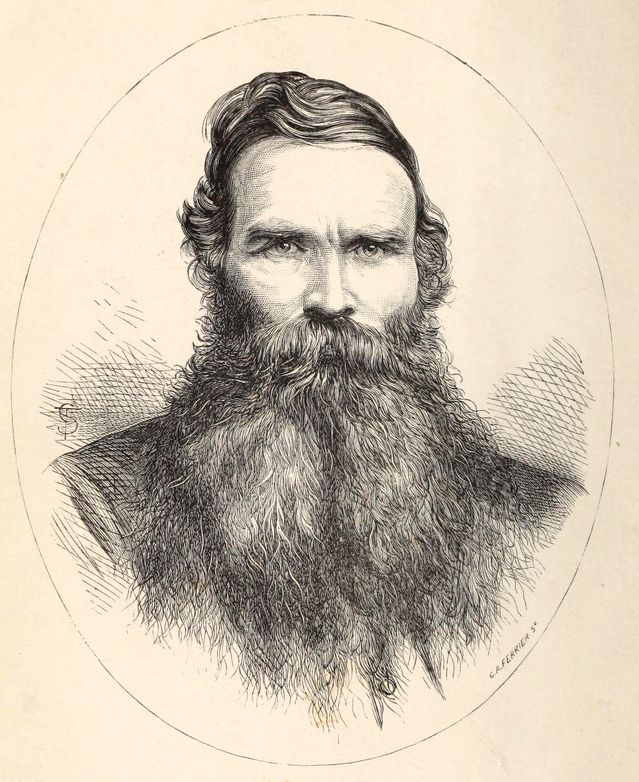
Reverend Taylor in South Africa

Taylor played an integral role in the Christian revival that swept South Africa in 1866. From 1863 to 1865 the prospect of religion was little felt, mainly due to unforgiving circumstances, which included drought that had brought ruin to farmers, which in turn impacted trade. Along with lung-disease, compounded by the drought, that killed thousands of cattle and sheep, any thoughts of hope and religious pursuits were not likely. Taylor arrived in South Africa on March 30, 1866, by way of the ship the St. Vincent, having anchored in Table Bay, Cape of Good Hope. At this time docks and a break-water were under construction in response to a gale force storm that had reeked death and destruction some eleven months prior. Cape Town at this time had a population of 28,547, of which 15,118 were whites, about 12,500 Malays, and 1,000 Khoekhoe and Kafirs. Taylor found an ideal interpreter, Charles Pamla, a native then in training for the ministry. On Taylor's first Sabbath in Cape Town on April 1, he delivered sermons at two Wesleyan chapels. As Taylor continued to deliver sermons about the colony the revival spread in great proportion. It is estimated that six thousand natives were converted to Christianity during this time.

His son Henry Reed Taylor was born in Cape Town became a pioneer ornithologist of California. As stated in his book "The Flaming Torch in Darkest Africa," the title of the work was adopted by the bishop according to the nickname given to him by the local community. In the introduction, written by Henry M. Stanley, it states, "The natives everywhere on the territories where his missionary work called him knew him as 'The Flaming Torch,' or 'Fire Stick,' as some might translate the Zulu word Isikunisivutayp."

On April 18, Taylor took passage on the steamer Natal and departed, for Port Elizabeth. He was received by reverend John Richards, the Superintendent of Port Elizabeth Circuit. Together they ventured into town and informed Richards' friends and associates of the sermons and meetings that were being planned by Taylor.

=== Barbados and British Guiana ===
In 1867, Taylor's wife, weary from all the traveling, decided to take the growing children back to California and resume their education. Taylor's next assignment brought him to Bridgetown on the tiny island of Barbados, where for three weeks he preached indoors and out in many of its towns. Everywhere he went he was received with favor and glad tidings. In his autobiography Taylor described the people of this island as "...exceedingly kind and appreciative".

His next visit brought him to Georgetown in British Guiana, and not waiting for the scheduled steamer to bring him there, he boarded a small schooner and, enduring a 450 mile voyage over rough seas, made his way to the South American coast thusly, arriving Sunday morning. Upon his arrival he was greeted by Reverend John Greathead, who welcomed him, but also confided that Taylor had arrived "just in the nick of time". The District Conference had just opened and right off there was a serious misunderstanding between the chairman of the district and conference members. Greathead exclaimed his confidence to Taylor feeling that only someone as he could remedy the situation. After Taylor finished preaching to the people, and to the children, and had converted some five hundred people to Christianity, it appeared that Taylor, albeit indirectly, had remedied the situation by the time the Conference had resumed. While in Georgetown he also ministered to the lepers at the lazaretto there.

=== India ===
Taylor arrived in Bombay on November 20, 1870, to begin his missionary work on the self-supporting plan, continuing the missionary work first started by Reverend William Butler in 1856, and Bishop Thoburn. (Note: Thoburn had already established the largest church in South India and was serving in India for thirty years, working with Taylor during his last few years there.) Taylor began his service by preaching to the English speaking people in the evenings, and to the Hindustani people of lower India, through an interpreter during the mornings. Taylor's influence was immediate and well received.and greatly provided the impetus within the revival that was then occurring. (Note: The results of this campaign were organized into the South. India Conference in 1876)

Taylor received a letter from Reverend James Thoburn, brother of Isabella Thoburn, inviting him to come to north India was extended every facility for conducting sermons to people there. The letter was addressed to the "Wesley an Headquarters in London.". Taylor didn't receive the letter until almost a year later. He was met at the Lucknow station on November 25, by Reverends Thoburn, and reverends Waugh and Parker. Thoburn had already known Taylor since twelve years. On the following Sunday morning, the twenty-fifth, he preached his first sermon in India at Lucknow. He had already been encouraged to make an Evangelistic tour of India in 1863 from Reverend J. Smith, a missionary who had attended Taylor's services in Melbourne, Australia, along with a similar request from a missionary in New South Wales. In December 1865 Taylor's family arriving from California joined him in Sydney. He had not seen them for more than three years. His sons had grown such that Taylor would not have recognized them had he encountered them elsewhere.

He arrived in Lucknow late in November, 1870, and at once began his work by preaching to the English speaking people in the evenings, and to the Hindustani people, through an interpreter, in the mornings. The impression produced was immediate, deep, and abiding.

In the autumn of 1871 Taylor received a special invitation from the missionaries of the American Board of Commissioners for Foreign Missions, (Note: In the preface of Four years' campaign in India", 1875 it states:"The American Board of Commissioners for Foreign Missions is the oldest institution in the Formation of the United States for sending missionaries to foreign unevangelized nations. It was formed at Bradford, Massachusetts, in June, 1810, by the General Association of that State.") in the Bombay to serve a few weeks, beginning in Ahmednagar, and then in Bombay with Reverend Charles Harding.by establishing self-supporting missions. Unfamiliar with the Marathi language he made use of an interpreter, Pastor Modak, to communicate with the native population. When Taylor arrived in Bombay, though he was not there to represent any particular denomination, felt somewhat out of place among the English and Eurasians in their church organization. From time to time he was approached by ministers and laypeople as to whether he was there to promote Methodism, per se. Subsequently he felt compelled to clarify his position, leading him to author his work, entitled, Four years' campaign in India

In Bombay Taylor began a series of meetings in the city's mission chapel which was attended by various Europeans and Indo-Britons. Here he succeeded in converting many, including some Muslims, to Christianity. Taylor's service in India lasted for a period of seven years. Other Reverends involved in missionary work and associated with Taylor were Reverend Knowles who was expecting Taylor's arrival and had readied accommodations for his stay in India, along with Reverend, and Reverend Henry Mansell, Presiding Elder of the Moradabad District.

=== South America ===
Taylor's calling to Chile (Note: Taylor and other sources have the country's name spelled as "Chili".) was inspired by his interest in establishing churches and schools in that country. To serve in Chlie Taylor previously had recruited three groups of missionaries who arrived at different times. The first party included A. P. Stonewall, William A Wright and Ira Haynes La Fetra, a Methodist missionary and graduate of Boston University School of Theology who founded the Santiago College in Chili in 1880. His brother Ira gave to the college a printing press with which they printed great volumes of religious literature in Spanish.

The Taylor party assembled in New York ready to make the trip, but Taylor as of yet was not provided the appropriate funds needed to make the journey comfortably. Determined, they had no other recourse but to settle for steerage passage, and each were given a blanket, and a small mattress and together they pooled their money to secure basic canned goods. Taylor's initial objective was simply to assess the country and determine if it was practical to establish a self-supporting missionary as he had done in southern India. His main objective at this time, however, was not to undertake missionary work, but to secure the cooperation and support of the Protestant residents to establish a number of churches. Among the more prominent residents there at this time was Dr. David Trumbull, a Protestant missionary and founder of the Presbyterian church in Chile who gave his complete support to Taylor's efforts. Among those Taylor had recruited was Dr. Hoover, a young physician from northern Illinois with a thriving practice, which he gave up in order to come to Chile to serve as a medical missionary under Taylor.

On October 16, 1877, Taylor purchased two tickets for himself and his brother Reverend Archibald Taylor and departed from New York aboard the Acapulco, a mail steamship, for the west coast of South America at Callao, Peru, by way of the Panama Railroad (Note: The Panama Railroad was built to meet the demand during the California Gold Rush for a fast route to California.) in Colón, in Panama. Taylor sailed from Panama for Callao on the steamship Bolivia, of the Pacific Steam Navigation Company, arriving November 3, 1877. The repair shops of the company were situated here, which employed about four hundred men. (Note: The company was founded by William Wheelwright, a "disciple of Christ" in 1838.)

From Callao Taylor proceeded to Mollendo, a port city with a railroad that extended into Bolivia, passing through the important city of Arequipa. In Mollendo received by the British consul. Taylor's next port of call was at Arica, just across the border in Chili, which was still recovering from a tremendous earthquake and tidal wave. They were subsequently not very interested in the religious services Taylor had offered but were in need of teachers. From there he proceeded to Tacna, a flourishing city of fourteen thousand, where he managed to secure passage money for a teacher needed in Arica. After making more stops along the coast he arrived at Chañaral. where the Reverend Langbridge and his wife had already arrived from England, a month previous, to teach and preach. Not being very needed there he continued on to the next port, in Caldera.

They arrived at Valparaíso in 1878 and began ministering first to seamen in that port city. From 1878 to 1879 Taylor had recruited and sent to Chile twenty-five missionary preachers and teachers. He gave them each an assignment and appointed a committee chairman who was responsible for their provisions and salary in their efforts to establishment badly needed schools.

=== Central Africa ===
The Liberia Conference met January 28, 1884, at Cape Palmas, with Reverend. C. A. Pitman presiding. Reverend. Daniel Ware was elected clerical delegate to the General Conference. The members reported were 2,337, with 35 Sunday schools and 2,178 scholars. On May 22 of that year Reverend Taylor was elected "Missionary Bishop for Africa" by the General Conference of the Methodist Episcopal Church by a vote of two hundred and fifty votes out of three hundred and fifty-three, (Note: A two-thirds majority of votes was required for the election of a Bishop.) and was also duly ordained along with other bishops. Dr. W. R. Summers, Levin Johnson, Reverend. Taylor and C. L. Davenport were received into the Conference, being designed for a field southward which. Bishop Taylor afterward had opened. On January 29, 1885 Bishop Taylor presided over the Liberia Conference.

While in Africa Taylor encountered cannibal tribes throughout the interior. He was appalled at such practices, which included the display of human skulls on and about the various homes and other structures. At the World’s Congress of Religions, Taylor exclaimed that he had witnessed first hand in the Congo where women, who were too weak or ill to catch fish, or do other work, were subsequently strangled and burnt to ashes. He was convinced that the only way to change their ways was to appeal to their hearts by way of the gospel, an effort to which he committed much of his time, often to no avail.

Though Bishop Taylor received much acclaim during his missionary career he was, however, criticized by Robert Cust, Acting Secretary of the Royal Asiatic Society, writing in the introduction to Heli Chatelain's Grammatica Elementar du Kimbundu ou Lingua de Angola for conducting "Self-Supporting Missions" in Angola, implying that the poverty his leadership caused for his deacons resulted in the death of Dr. Summers at the Luluaburg mission on the Upper Kassai River, Angola. Nonetheless, the mission did produce the first modern grammar of Kimbundu, the national language of Angola. (Note: The "self-supporting mission" concept is not explained in Robert Cust's note, but he squarely identified himself as critical of Taylor's "missionary methods".)

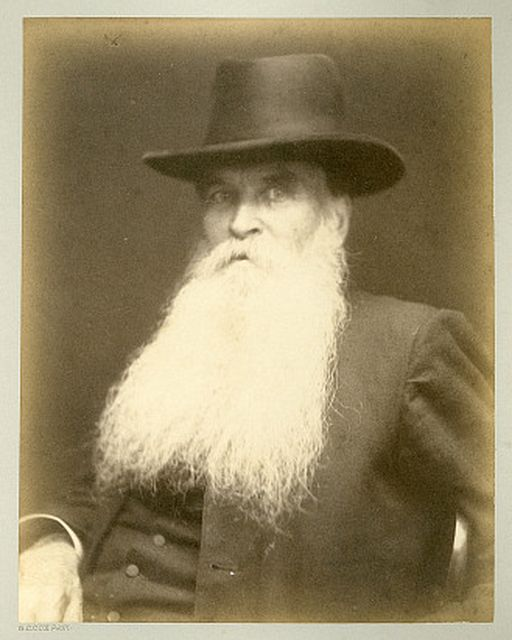
Bishop William Taylor in later years

== Final years and legacy ==
At the age of seventy-five, longing to be with his family for his remaining years, Taylor was relieved of his responsibilities by the General Conference in 1896 and was replaced by Joseph C. Hartzel. He returned to California to rejoin with his family, with whom he had often been separated because of his missionary work around the world. At the age of 81 Taylor died in Palo Alto, California on May 19, 1902, shortly after his 81st birthday. He had been called the “Flaming Torch” by the Africans. In 1890, Reverend David Ela said of Taylor, "Nothing more romantic than the 'Taylor movement' has occurred in the history of the church since the crusades, and nothing better calculated to excite the imagination."

David Bundy, Professor of Church History at the Christian Theological Seminary maintains that, "Taylor, more than any other, was responsible for the expansion of the Methodist Episcopal Church beyond Europe and North America."

Taylor University, a Christian college in Indiana, was named after Taylor.

== Works ==
- Taylor, William (1856). Seven years' street preaching in San Francisco, California. New York: Carlton & Porter. (Note: Republished in 1875)
- —— (1858). California life illustrated. New York: Carlton & Porter.
- —— (1859). The Best Mode of Preaching the Gospel. Cincinnati: Swormstedt & Poe. ISBN 978-0-7905-6576-7.
- —— (1861). Address to Young America, and a Word to the Old Folks. Philadelphia: Perkinpine & Higgins.
- —— (1862). Cause and probable results of the civil war in America. Facts for the people of Great Britain. London: Simpkin, Marshall & co.
- —— (1874) [1867]. Reconciliation, or, How to be saved. London : S.W. Partridge; New York : Nelson and Phillips.
- —— (1875). Infancy and manhood of Christian life. London : S.W. Partridge; New York : Nelson and Phillips.
- —— (1875). Four years' campaign in India. New York: Nelson & Phillips.
- —— (1879). Our South American cousins. New York : Phillips & Hunt; London : Hodder and Stoughton.
- —— (1881). Christian adventures in South Africa. Toronto.
- —— (1882). Ten years of self-supporting missions in India. New York: Phillips & Hunt.
- —— (1895). Ridpath, John (ed.). Story of my life. Toronto: W. Briggs.
- ——; Holub, Emil (1895). Africa Illustrated. New York.
- —— (1896). The flaming torch in darkest Africa. New York: Eaton & Mains.

== See also ==
- John Wesley (1703 – 1791) Founder of the Methodist church
- List of bishops of the United Methodist Church
- George Whitefield (1714 – 1770) P remier Methodist minister in colonial America
- Justus Henry Nelson - Amazon missionary recruited by Taylor
- William Fitzjames Oldham (1854–1937) - Methodist missionary bishop for South Asia
- John McKendree Springer (1873–1963) - Methodist missionary Bishop in Africa
- 100 McAllister Street - originally known as the William Taylor Hotel and Temple Methodist Episcopal Church
- John Wesley - "English cleric, theologian, and evangelist who was a leader of a revival movement within the Church of England known as Methodism."
- Robert Moffat (missionary) — Missionary in South Africa. Printed the Bible in 1825 in the native language.

== Bibliography ==
- Abraham, William I.; Kirby, James E., eds. (2011). The Oxford handbook of Methodist studies. New York: Oxford University Press.
- Anderson, Rufus (1874). History of the missions of the American board of commissioners for foreign missions in India. Boston: Congregational Pub. Soc.
- Arms, Goodsil Filley (1921). History of the William Taylor self-supporting missions in South America. New York, &Cincinnati: The Methodist book concern.
- Barclay, Wade Crawford (1957). History of Methodist Missions. Vol. III. The Board of Missions and Church Extension of the Methodist Church.
- —— (1949). History of Methodist Missions. Vol. IV. The Board of Missions and Church Extension of the Methodist Church.
- "Taylor, William". Dictionary of African Christian Biography. 2024.
- Buck, Oscar MacMillan (1936). Malone, Dumas (ed.). Dictionary of American biography. Vol. XVIII. New York: Charles Scribner's Sons. pp. 345–346.
- Bundy, David (October 1994). "The legacy of William Taylor". International Bulletin of Missionary Research. 18 (4): 172–175. doi:10.1177/239693939401800405.
- Curts, Lewis E. (1900). General conferences of the Methodist Episcopal Church from 1792 to 1896. Cincinnati: Curts & Jennings; New York : Eaton & Mains.
- Davies, Edward (1885). The Bishop of Africa; or, The life of William Taylor, D.D. With an account of the Congo country, and mission. New York: Eaton & Mains.
- Dodge, Ralph Edward (1959). Methodist missions in Africa. New York: Joint Section of Education and Cultivation, Board of Missions, The Methodist Church.
- Du Plessis, Johannes (1911). A history of Christian missions in South Africa. London: Longmans Green.
- Ela, David Hough (1890). A study of the Taylor missions of the Methodist Episcopal Church.
- Methodist Episcopal Church Missionary Society (1880). The Gospel in all lands. New York: Missionary Society of the Methodist Episcopal Church.
- Hunt, Rockwell D. (January 1950). California's Stately Hall of Fame. Stockton, California: College of the Pacific.
- Jenness, Mary (1934). Giants in action : outstanding leaders in American Methodism.
- John, I.G. (1893). Hand book of Methodist missions. Nashville: Board of Missions, M. E. Church, South.
- Kverndal, Roald (1986). Seamen's missions : their origin and early growth. Pasadena, Calif.: William Carey Library. ISBN 978-0-87808-4401.
- Lay, Robert (2010). Lessons of Infinite Advantage. Scarecrow Press. ISBN 978-0-81086-0599.
- McLeod, Mrs. J. (1894). Missions in Africa. Woman's Foreign Missionary Society.
- Oldham, William Fitzjames (1918). Thoburn--called of God. New York & Cincinnati: The Methodist Book Concern.
- Paul, John Haywood (1928). The soul digger; or, Life and times of William Taylor. Taylor University Press.
- Sales, Jane M (1971). The planting of the churches in South Africa. New York; Cincinnati: Methodist Book Concern.
- Scott, O.W. (1900). Bishop William Taylor in Africa. Boston: Woman's Foreign Missionary Society.
- Stevens, Abel (1899). Supplementary history of American Methodism; a continuation of the author's Abridged history of American methodism. New York: Eaton & Mains.
- —— (1912). A compendious history of American Methodism : abridged from the author's History of the Methodist Episcopal Church. New York: Methodist Book Concern.
- Taylor, William (1895). Story of My Life (autobiography). Toronto: William Briggs.
- —— (1898). The flaming torch in darkest Africa. New York: Eaton & Mains.
- Thoburn, James Mills (1884). My Missionary Apprenticeship. New York: Phillips & Hunt.
- —— (1903). Life of Isabella Thoburn. Cincinnati: Jennings and Pye.
- Tzan, Dr. Douglas D. Wesley Theological Seminary (2024). William Taylor, 'Taylor' Missionaries and Shifting Concepts of Holiness in Nineteenth Century Calls to Missionary Service (PDF). Wesley Theological Seminary.
- —— (2019). William Taylor and the Mapping of the Methodist Missionary Tradition: The World His Parish. Rowman & Littlefield. ISBN 978-1-49855-9096.
- Whiteside, James (1906). History of the Wesleyan Methodist Church of South Africa. London : Elliot Stock; Capetown : Juta & Co.; Methodist Book Room.
- Methodist Episcopal Church. Board of Foreign Missions (1907). Annual report of the Board of Foreign Missions of the Methodist Episcopal Church. New York: Board of Foreign Missions of the Methodist Episcopal Church.
