= Ying Fuk-tsang =

Christian historian

Ying Fuk-tsang (Chinese: 邢福增) is a Christian historian. He is Professor, the Pommerenke Lecturer of Christianity, and the former director of the Divinity School of Chung Chi College, Chinese University of Hong Kong (CUHK).

== Biography ==
Born and raised in Hong Kong, Ying attended Newman Catholic College for HKCEE (1982) and New Method College for A levels (1983). He received all of his tertiary education at the CUHK: Bachelor of Arts in History (1987), Master of Philosophy in Chinese church history (1989), and Doctor of Philosophy in Chinese church history (1995). His master thesis' topic is "The Adaptation of Religious Belief and Cultural Environment of Chinese Christians in the late Qing Dynasty (1860-1911)," supervised by Wang Erh Ming (Chinese: 王爾敏). His PhD topic is "Saving the Nations in Christianity: Xu Qian, Feng Yü-hsiang, and Zhang Zhijiang," supervised by Lau Yee-cheung and Leung Yuen-sang. Ying was baptized at Ward Methodist Church in 1987 and became a volunteer missionary with the Hong Kong Methodist Church in 1999.

Ying was Assistant Professor and the Director of Christianity and Chinese Culture Research Centre (CCCRC) at Alliance Bible Seminary between 1993 and 2004. In 2004, he moved to the CUHK as Professor at the Culture and Religious Studies Department, Director of the Christian Study Centre on Chinese Religion and Culture (CSCCRC) and Associate Director of Centre for Christian Studies. He was Director of Divinity School of Chung Chi College between 2014 and 2020, succeeded by Francis Ching-wah Yip in July 2020.

He was a recipient of the Vice-Chancellor's Exemplary Teaching Award (2010–11).
