= Helenor M. Davisson =

First woman ordained in American Methodist Church

Helenor Alter Draper Davisson was an ordained minister in the Methodist church in Indiana. Davisson was the first woman ordained in American Methodist Church.

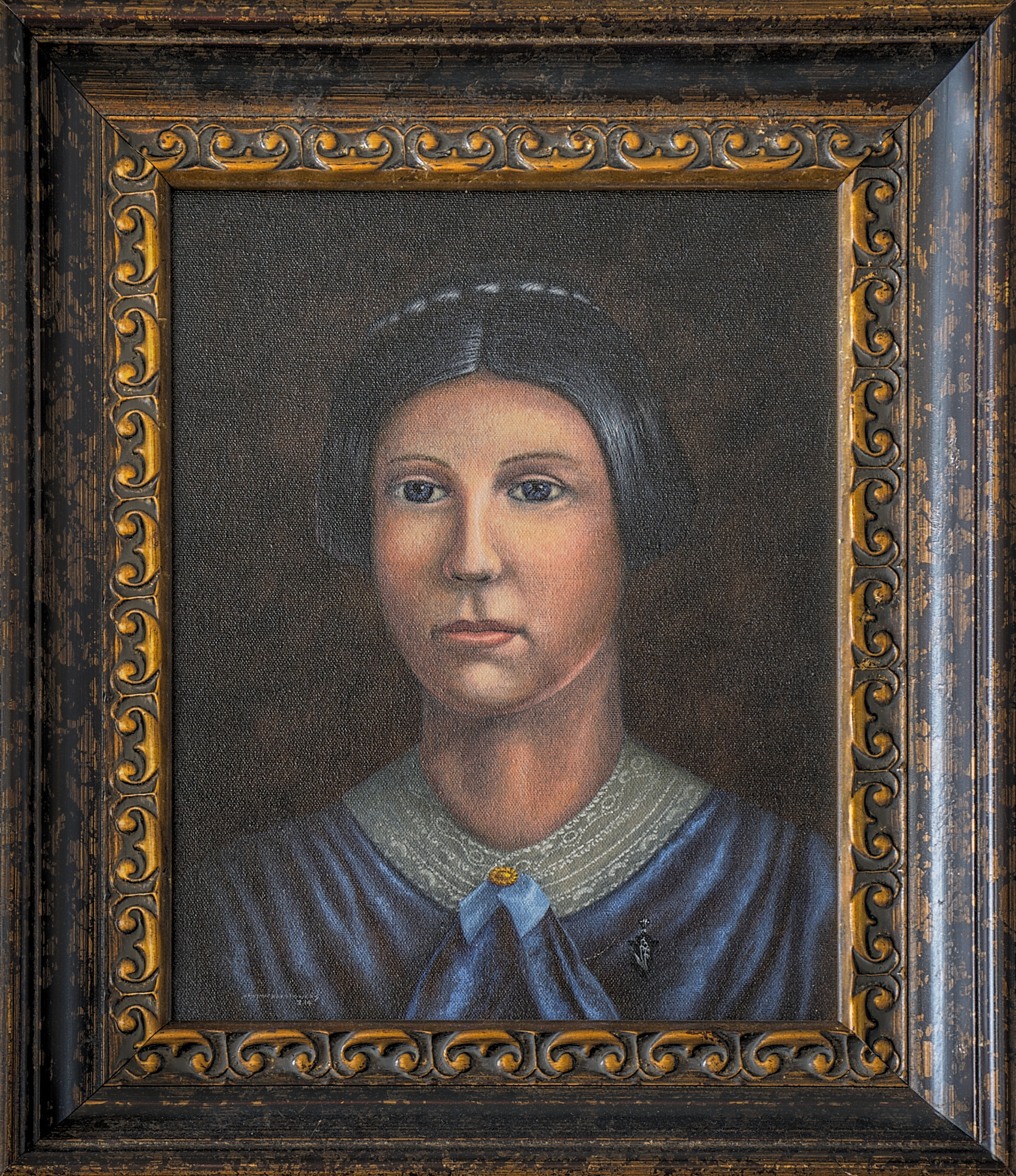
Painting of Davisson on display at the World Methodist Museum, Lake Junaluska, NC

== Early life ==
Helenor Alter was born in 1823 to John and Charity VanAusdall Alter in Pennsylvania.

== Clergy ==
In 1842, Davisson joined her father in his ministry, riding with him on horseback as they worked in Indiana.

Davisson was recommended for deacon's orders at the Quarterly Meeting of the Grand Prairie Circuit in 1865 and in 1866 became the first ordained woman in American Methodism.

== Personal life ==
In 1842, she married John Draper.
