= Sione ʻAmanaki Havea =

Tongan Methodist minister and theologian (1922–2000)

- Born: 1922
- Died: 2000 (aged 77–78)
- Known for: Coconut theology

Ecclesiastical career
- Church: Free Wesleyan Church of Tonga

Sione ʻAmanaki Havea (1922–2000) was a Tongan Methodist minister and theologian, known for developing a contextual theology for the context of the Pacific Islands.

== Career ==
Havea was a strong advocate for ecumenism amongst Christians in Oceania. He served as the first chairman of the Pacific Conference of Churches (1966–1971) and was an active participant in the World Council of Churches.

Havea was an ordained Methodist minister who served for two terms as president of the Free Wesleyan Church of Tonga (1971–1977 and 1982–1992). Between these terms, he also served as the principal of the Pacific Theological College, in Fiji (1977–1981), an institution which trains students mainly coming from Pacific Island churches, establishing a woman's program and advancing a theological orientation which addresses the context of Oceanic culture.

== Theology ==
Havea is best known for promoting the construction of Pacific theology, one that comes from the soil and context of the Pacific Islands. He believed one of the most vivid images for Oceanic culture was the coconut and spoke of a coconut theology.
