= Pacific Conference of Churches =

Regional ecumenical organization in the Pacific region

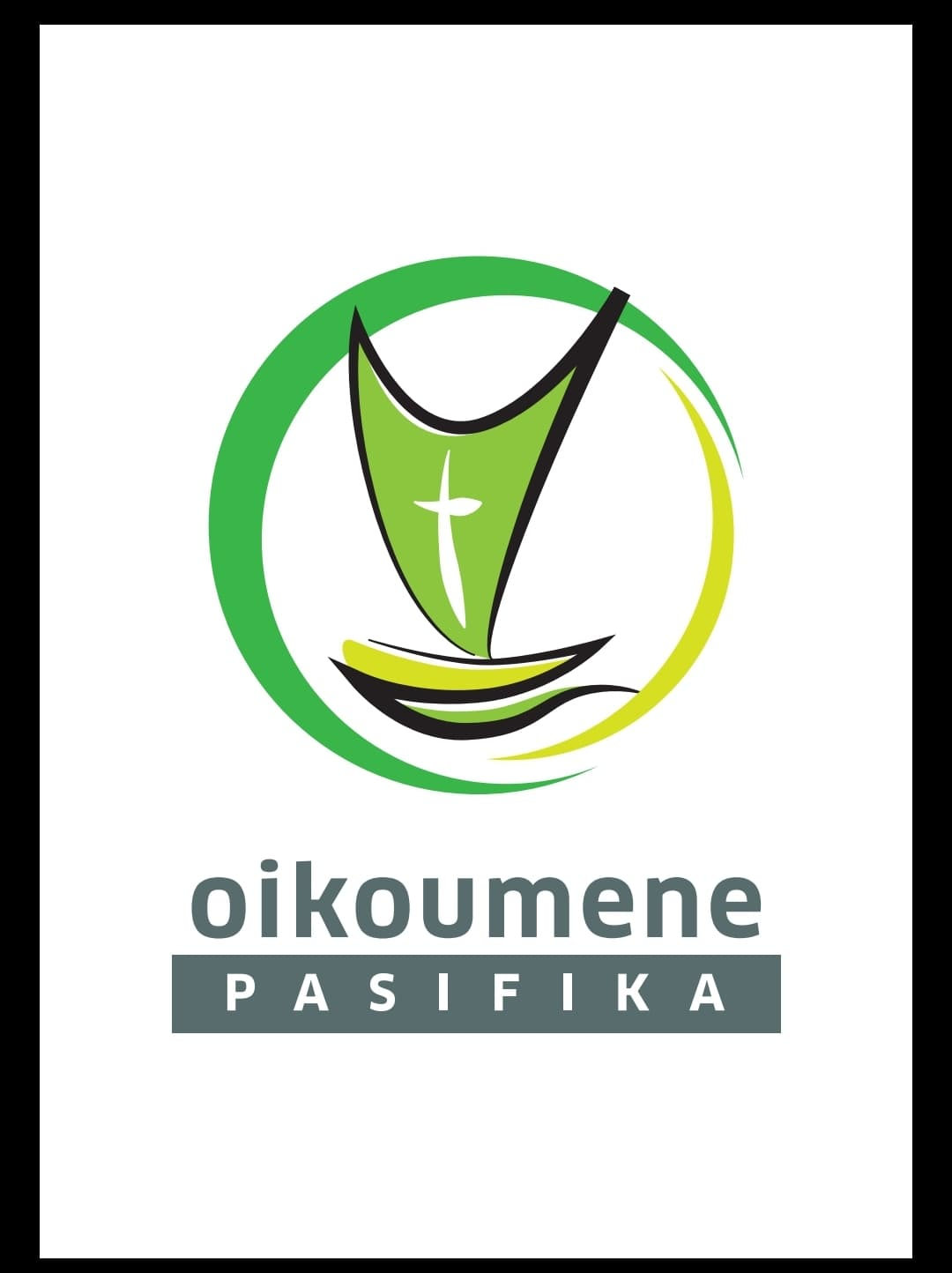
The logo of the PCC.

The Pacific Conference of Churches (PCC) is an ecumenical organization representing Christian churches in the Pacific region. It seeks the visible unity of the church on issues of justice, peace and integrity of creation, initiatives on capacity building, and solidarity with its members during times of natural disasters and internal social upheavals.

In early 2026 Reverend James Bhagwan of Fiji is the General Secretary of the PCC. He was elected in November 2018.

== History ==
The roots of the Pacific Conference of Churches can be traced to a 1961 consultation held at Malua Theological Seminary in Samoa, followed by its founding in 1966 when its first assembly met on the Loyalty Island of Lifou, New Caledonia. Its first chairman was the Tongan Methodist Sione 'Amanaki Havea, serving from 1966 to 1971.

From very modest beginnings in the early 1960s, its membership is now numbered at about 27 Pacific member Churches and 11 National Council of Churches (NCCs). The head office of the Pacific Conference of Churches is based in Suva, Fiji.

== Programmes ==
At their meeting in Pago Pago, American Samoa, in 2007, the ninth General Assembly of the Pacific Conference of Churches agreed on six main programmes to focus on.

1. Ecumenism in the Pacific
2. Human Rights
3. Good Governance and Leadership
4. Environment and Climate Change
5. HIV / AIDS
6. Globalization and Trade

Furthermore, there are two sectoral programmes specifying on certain target groups.

1. Women Development
2. Youth Empowerment

== Vision ==
PCC is “a fellowship of Churches and Church organisations […] that seeks to fulfill together their common calling to the Glory of One God – Father, Son, and Holy Spirit” (PCC Constitution Part 4).

In essence, PCC strives toward a vision of a Pacific region that is characterized by the values of unity, solidarity, justice, peace, dialogue and leadership after the heart and mind of Jesus, and a spirituality that gives grounding and substance to PCC's existence and to the work it does.

== Mission ==
Recognising PCC's Aims as stipulated in its Constitution (Part 5), its mission is to:

1. Encourage and promote a spirit of ecumenism among the Churches in the Pacific.
2. Encourage and support member Churches to seek the guidance of the Holy Spirit in studying and working towards the full visible unity of the one undivided Church.
3. Help members evaluate their work in mission and to help them co-ordinate, organize and plan together so that wherever possible their personnel, finance and material resources can be more effectively utilized in joint action for mission.
4. Encourage and promote among members a greater awareness of justice, peace, integrity of creation and human development among the people and nations of the Pacific region and the world.
5. Facilitate mutual consultation on issues affecting Church relationship and other issues of common concern among the members.
6. Encourage and promote active participation by members in the wider ecumenical movement.
7. Be a means whereby the Churches of the Pacific can help each other and help Churches and other organizations in other parts of the world in times of natural disaster and special need, or to secure help from the Churches in the other parts of the world in times of similar natural disaster or need.
8. Encourage and promote programmes and disseminate information for the preaching and spreading of the Word of God.
9. Undertake such co-operative activities and programmes on behalf of members as the Assembly may from time to time approve.
10. Encourage and promote inter-faith dialogue.
