= W. E. Sangster =

English Methodist minister and writer (1900–1960)

William Edwin Robert Sangster (1900 – 1960) was an English Methodist minister and writer.

== Life ==
Sangster was born June 5, 1900, in Shoreditch, London, to Henry George (a box cutter) and Martha Elizabeth (a homemaker). He was the third of five children. Sangster said of his family's Christianity, 'they were devoted Church of England...but just stayed away'.

He left school at 15 to become an office boy. He preached his first sermon aged 16 after being drawn to Methodism, and became a local preacher by 17. After serving in World War I, he trained for the Methodist ministry at Handsworth and Richmond Colleges, and was ordained in Wesley Chapel in York when he was 26.

Shortly after his ordination, he married Margaret Conway, who he had previously met at Radnor Street Mission, a Methodist Hall. They had twins, Paul and Margaret, a year later.

== Ministry ==
He had short term pastorates in Wales and the north of England, and in 1939 became senior minister at Westminster Central Hall, where he had the largest Sunday evening congregation in London, filling over 2,000 seats.

Sangster became President of the Methodist Conference in 1950, and General Secretary of the Home Mission Department for British Methodism in 1955.

He lectured around the world, as well as writing books and for various newspapers, including the Daily Express and the Sunday Times.

== Illness and death ==
Towards the end of the 1950s, he was diagnosed with progressive muscular atrophy. He died in Wandsworth, London, on 24 May (Wesley Day), 1960.

== Books ==
- Why Jesus Never Wrote a Book and Other Addresses – 1932
- God Does Guide Us – 1934
- He Is Able – 1936
- Methodism Can Be Born Again – 1938
- These Things Abide: Devotional Meditations in Dark Days – 1939
- The Christian Has Wings: A Christian Commentary on Democracy's War Aims – 1941
- Ten Statesmen and Jesus Christ: A Christian Commentary on Our War Aims – 1941
- The Path to Perfection: An Examination and Restatement of John Wesley's Doctrine of Christian Perfection – 1943
- The Craft of Sermon Illustration – 1946
- Methodism, Her Unfinished Task – 1947
- Let Me Commend: Realistic Evangelism – 1948
- The Craft of the Sermon – 1951
- The Approach to Preaching – 1951
- Let Me Commend – 1951
- A Spiritual Check-up – 1952
- Doctrinal Preaching: Its Neglect and Recovery – 1953
- The Craft of Sermon Construction: A Source Book for Ministers – 1951
- The Pure in Heart: A Study in Christian Sanctity – 1954
- They Met at Calvary: Were You There? – 1956
- The Secret of Radiant Life – 1957
- Power in Preaching – 1958
- Teach Us to Pray – 1958
- Teach Me to Pray – 1959
- Questions People Ask About Religion – 1959
- Sangster of Westminster – 1960
- Can I Know God? and Other Sermons – 1960
- Sangster's Special-Day Sermons – 1960
- Westminster Sermons – 1960
- Sangster at Filey: Talks Given by the Rev. W. E. Sangster, D.D., under the Auspices of the Movement for World Evangelization – 1961
- The Pattern of Prayer – 1962
- Special-Day Sermons – 1962
- A Sangster Anthology – 1964
- Daily Readings From W. E. Sangster – 1966
