= Francis Ching-wah Yip =

Francis Ching-wah Yip (Chinese: 葉菁華; born 1967) is director and associate professor of divinity school of Chung Chi College (DSCCC), Chinese University of Hong Kong (CUHK).

== Biography ==
Yip attended in Christian primary schools and was active in student fellowship during high school. He obtained a Bachelor of Social Science, major in Journalism at the CUHK. Between 1992 and 1995, he studied M.Div. at the DSCCC. before receiving a scholarship to do a Th.D. at Harvard Divinity School and graduated in 2004. His Ph.D. thesis was then published as a monograph, named Capitalism as Religion? A Study of Paul Tillich's Interpretation of Modernity.

He joined the DSCCC in 2005 as assistant professor. In August 2020, he succeeded Ying Fuk-tsang as the Director of DSCCC. He was nicknamed as "Teacher Frog" by his students at DSCCC.

== Works ==
- Yip, Francis Ching-Wah (2010). Capitalism as Religion? A Study of Paul Tillich's Interpretation of Modernity. Cambridge, MA: Harvard Theological Studies. ISBN 9780674021471.
- Kwok, Pui-lan; Yip, Francis Ching-Wah, eds. (2021). The Hong Kong Protests and Political Theology. Rowman & Littlefield. ISBN 9781538148716.
